= The Fratellis discography =

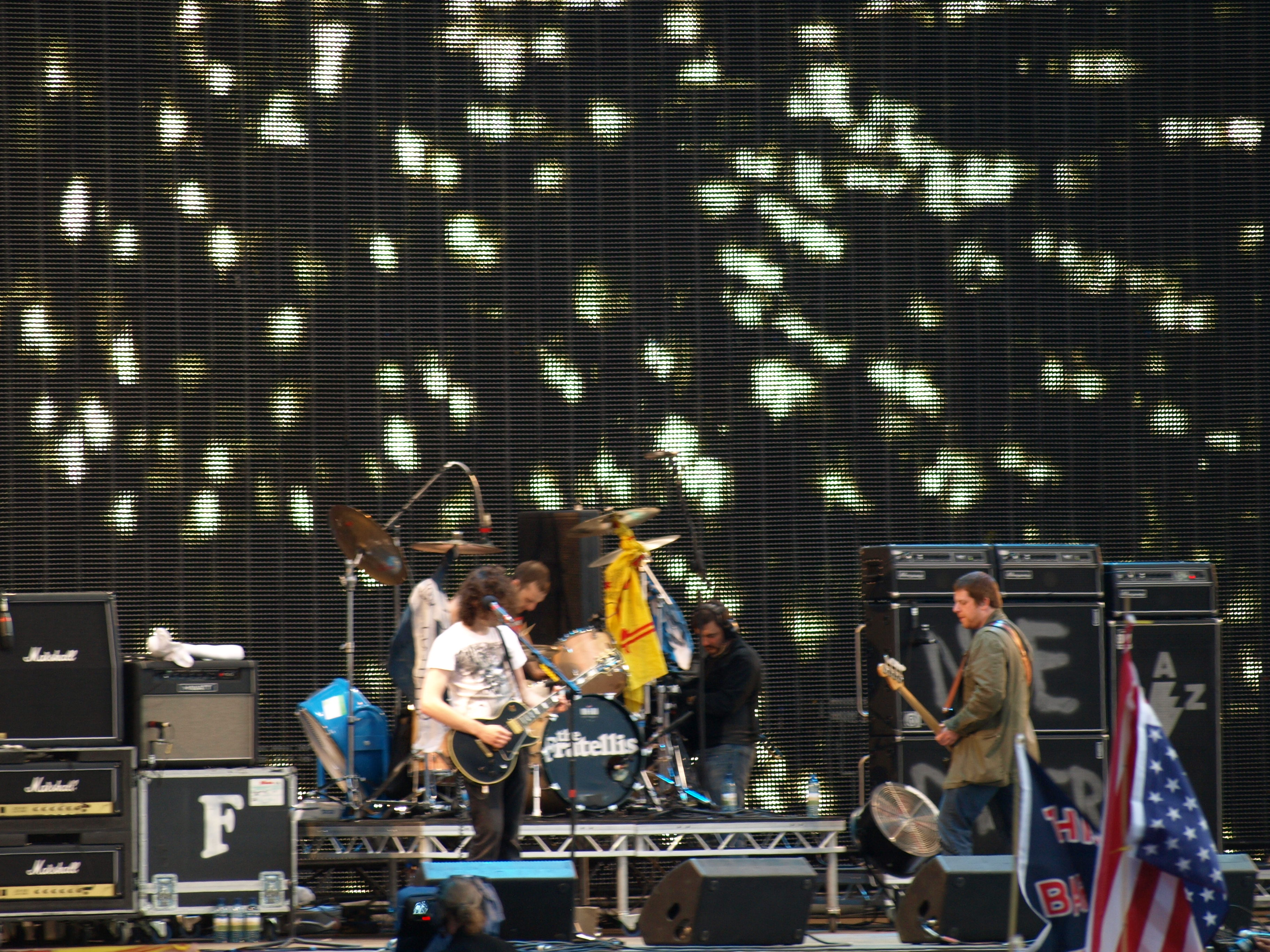
- The Fratellis on stage in July 2008.
- Studio albums: 6
- Extended plays: 4
- Singles: 17
- Video albums: 2
- Music videos: 12
- B-sides: 19

This is the discography of Scottish band The Fratellis. They have released 6 studio albums, 4 EPs, and 17 singles since their breakthrough in 2006. They won in the category Best British Breakthrough Act at the 2007 BRIT Awards.

== Studio albums ==
| Title | Album details | Peak chart positions | | | | | | | | | | Certifications |
| Title | Album details | SCO | AUS | AUT | FRA | IRL | JPN | NLD | SWI | UK | US | Certifications |
|---|---|---|---|---|---|---|---|---|---|---|---|---|
| Costello Music | Released: 26 September 2006; Label: Fallout; Format: CD, LP, digital download | 1 | 57 | 50 | 98 | 16 | 15 | 13 | 78 | 2 | 48 | BPI: 4× Platinum |
| Here We Stand | Released: 9 June 2008; Label: Island; Format: CD, CD/DVD, digital download | 2 | 20 | 40 | 105 | 13 | 17 | 75 | 25 | 5 | 80 | BPI: Gold |
| We Need Medicine | Released: 7 October 2013; Label: BMG; Format: CD, LP, digital download | 11 | — | — | — | — | 53 | — | — | 26 | 106 | |
| Eyes Wide, Tongue Tied | Released: 21 August 2015; Label: Cooking Vinyl; Format: CD, LP, digital download | 5 | — | — | — | — | 93 | — | — | 16 | — | |
| In Your Own Sweet Time | Released: 16 March 2018; Label: Cooking Vinyl; Format: CD, LP, digital download, cassette | 2 | — | — | — | — | — | — | — | 5 | — (Note: In Your Own Sweet Time did not enter the US Billboard 200, but peaked at number 86 on the US Top Current Albums Chart.) | |
| Half Drunk Under a Full Moon | Released: 2 April 2021; Label: Cooking Vinyl | 3 | — | — | — | — | — | — | 81 | 12 | — (Note: Half Drunk Under a Full Moon did not enter the US Billboard 200, but peaked at number 62 on the US Top Current Albums Chart.) | |

== EPs ==
| Title | EP details | Peak chart positions |
| Title | EP details | UK |
|---|---|---|
| The Fratellis EP | Released: 3 April 2006; Label: Nomadic Music | —N/a^{[A]} |
| The Flathead EP | Released: 23 January 2007; Label: Universal/Island | — |
| Ole Black ‘n’ Blue Eyes EP | Released: 11 June 2007; Label: Universal/Island; Format: Vinyl, digital download | 168^{[B]} |
| The Soul Crush EP | Released: 8 September 2014; Format: Digital download | — |

Notes

- A The Fratellis EP was ineligible for the UK Charts due to the fact the EP was limited in numbers and contained stickers.
- B The Ole Black 'n' Blue Eyes EP vinyl released contained stickers, making it ineligible for the UK charts, so it charted on the strength of digital downloads alone.

== Singles ==
| Title | Year | Peak chart positions | | | | | | | | | | Certifications | Album |
| Title | Year | SCO | CAN | CZR | GER | IRL | JPN | NLD | NZ | UK | US | Certifications | Album |
|---|---|---|---|---|---|---|---|---|---|---|---|---|---|
| "Henrietta" | 2006 | 6 | — | — | — | — | — | — | — | 19 | — | BPI: Gold | Costello Music |
| "Chelsea Dagger" | 2006 | 2 | — | 90 | — | 33 | — | 4 | 38 | 5 | — (Note: "Chelsea Dagger" did not enter the Billboard Hot 100, but peaked at number 37 on the US Ringtones chart.) | BPI: 3× Platinum; RMNZ: Platinum | Costello Music |
| "Whistle for the Choir" | 2006 | 2 | — | — | — | — | — | — | — | 9 | — | BPI: Gold | Costello Music |
| "Flathead" | 2007 | — | 79 | — | 77 | — | — | — | — | 67 | 73 | | Costello Music |
| "Baby Fratelli" | 2007 | 2 | — | — | — | — | — | — | — | 24 | — | | Costello Music |
| "Ole Black ‘n’ Blue Eyes" | 2007 | — | — | — | — | — | — | — | — | 168 | — | | Costello Music |
| "Mistress Mabel" | 2008 | 3 | — | — | — | — | 72 | — | — | 23 | — | | Here We Stand |
| "Look Out Sunshine!" | 2008 | 1 | — | — | — | — | — | — | — | 70 | — (Note: "Look Out Sunshine!" did not enter the Billboard Hot 100, but peaked at number 13 on the Hot Singles Sales chart.) | | Here We Stand |
| "A Heady Tale" | 2008 | 9 | — | — | — | — | — | — | — | — (Note: "A Heady Tale" did not enter the UK Singles Chart, but peaked at number 18 on the UK Physical Singles Chart Top 100.) | — | | Here We Stand |
| "Seven Nights Seven Days" | 2013 | — | — | — | — | — | 43 | — | — | — | — | | We Need Medicine |
| "She's Not Gone Yet But She's Leaving" | 2014 | — | — | — | — | — | — | — | — | — | — | | We Need Medicine |
| "Baby Don't You Lie to Me!" | 2015 | — | — | — | — | — | — | — | — | — | — | | Eyes Wide, Tongue Tied |
| "Dogtown" | 2015 | — | — | — | — | — | — | — | — | — | — | | Eyes Wide, Tongue Tied |
| "Impostors (Little by Little)" | 2015 | — | — | — | — | — | — | — | — | — | — | | Eyes Wide, Tongue Tied |
| "The Next Time We Wed" | 2017 | — | — | — | — | — | — | — | — | — | — | | In Your Own Sweet Time |
| "Stand Up Tragedy" | 2017 | — | — | — | — | — | — | — | — | — | — | | In Your Own Sweet Time |
| "I've Been Blind" | 2018 | — | — | — | — | — | — | — | — | — | — | | In Your Own Sweet Time |
| "Starcrossed Losers" | 2018 | — | — | — | — | — | — | — | — | — | — | | In Your Own Sweet Time |
| "Six Days in June" | 2020 | × | — | — | — | — | — | — | — | — | — | | Half Drunk Under a Full Moon |
| "Yes Sir, I Can Boogie" | 2021 | × | — | — | — | — | — | — | — | — (Note: "Yes Sir, I Can Boogie" did not enter the UK Singles Chart, but peaked at number 26 on the UK Singles Sales Chart Top 100.) | — | | Half Drunk Under a Full Moon |
"—" denotes single that did not chart or was not released "×" denotes periods where charts did not exist or were not archived

== Other releases ==
=== B-sides ===
| Year | B-side | A-side |
|---|---|---|
| 2006 | "Stacie Anne" | "Creepin' Up the Backstairs" (The Fratellis EP) |
| 2006 | "The Gutterati?" | "Creepin' Up the Backstairs" (The Fratellis EP) |
| 2006 | "Cigarello" | "Henrietta" |
| 2006 | "3 Skinny Girls" | "Henrietta" |
| 2006 | "Dirty Barry Stole the Bluebird" | "Chelsea Dagger" |
| 2006 | "The Pimp" | "Chelsea Dagger" |
| 2006 | "Nina" | "Whistle for the Choir" |
| 2006 | "Lay Down Easy" | "Whistle for the Choir" |
| 2007 | "Ooh La Hot Love" (Live) | "Baby Fratelli" |
| 2007 | "Solid Gold Easy Action" | "Baby Fratelli" |
| 2007 | "Baby's Got a Brand New Second Hand Disguise" | "Ole Black 'n' Blue Eyes" |
| 2007 | "Johnny Come Last" | "Ole Black 'n' Blue Eyes" |
| 2007 | "Mon Yous, Mon Us, But No Them" | "Ole Black 'n' Blue Eyes" |
| 2008 | "Boy Done Good" | "Mistress Mabel" |
| 2008 | "Ella's in the Band" | "Mistress Mabel" |
| 2008 | "When All the Lights Go Out" | "Mistress Mabel" |
| 2008 | "B Movie Saga" | "Look Out Sunshine!" |
| 2008 | "Z Movie Saga" | "Look Out Sunshine!" |
| 2008 | "The Good Life" | "Look Out Sunshine!" |
| 2008 | "Lonesome Anti-Christmas Blues" | "A Heady Tale" |
| 2008 | "Lazybones" | "A Heady Tale" |
| 2013 | "She's Not Gone Yet But She's Leaving" (Live from Glasgow Barrowlands) | "Seven Nights Seven Days" |
| 2013 | "Whisky Saga" (Live from Glasgow Barrowlands) | "Seven Nights Seven Days" |

=== Miscellaneous ===
- "Chelsea Dagger" appeared on Ginger and The Vegesaurs.
- "Whistle for the Choir" appears on Spongo, Fuzz & Jalapena.
- The songs "Solid Gold Easy Action" and "Baby Fratelli" were featured on the soundtrack to the film Hot Fuzz.
- The Fratellis' cover of "Stir It Up", originally by Bob Marley, appears on the album Island 50: 50 Years of Island Records.
- The Fratellis' cover of "All Along the Watchtower", originally by Bob Dylan, appears on the album Radio 1: Established 1967.

== DVD releases ==
- Edgy in Brixton

A live DVD recorded at the Brixton Academy in London, it was released on 1 October 2007. The performance features all songs from Costello Music along with some B-sides and Ooh La Hot Love, a cover of Goldfrapp's "Ooh La La" and T.Rex's "Hot Love".

- Here We Stand

The deluxe version of the album, released in December 2008 features a bonus DVD containing Live from Abbey Road performances, a documentary entitled The Year of the Thief, footage of the entire concert from The Filmore, San Francisco, and music videos for "Mistress Mabel" and "Look Out Sunshine!".

== Music videos ==
| Year | Title | Director |
|---|---|---|
| 2006 | "Creepin' Up the Backstairs" | Indica |
| 2006 | "Henrietta" | |
| 2006 | "Chelsea Dagger" | Ben Crook |
| 2006 | "Whistle for the Choir" | |
| 2007 | "Baby Fratelli" | |
| 2007 | "Ole Black 'n' Blue Eyes" | |
| 2007 | "Flathead" | James Sutton |
| 2008 | "Mistress Mabel" | Luc Janin |
| 2008 | "Look Out Sunshine!" | |
| 2008 | "A Heady Tale" | |
| 2013 | "Seven Nights Seven Days" | Alex Hardy |
| 2015 | "Baby Don't You Lie To Me!" | Libby Burke Wilde |
| 2017 | "Stand up Tragedy" | |
| 2018 | "Starcrossed Losers" | |
| 2018 | "I've Been Blind" | Theo Gee |
| 2020 | "Six Days In June" | Connor O'Hara |
| 2021 | "Action Replay" | Connor O'Hara |
| 2021 | "Need A Little Love" | |
| 2021 | "Strangers In The Street" | Josh McCartney |
