= Budhill Singles Club =

Studio album (Virtual) by The Fratellis
- Released: From 2006 onwards
- Recorded: From 2006 onwards
- Genre: Rock
- Producer: The Fratellis

The Budhill Singles Club is a collection of songs released by The Fratellis from 2006 to 2008. The name "Budhill" refers to the area of Springboig, Glasgow where Barry was born. They also visit Budhill Square during the video for Creepin' Up the Backstairs. Songs released to the Budhill Singles Club are generally acoustic or alternate versions of album tracks, although in some cases demos, live versions and unreleased songs have been included.

== Background and release ==
The Budhill Singles Club is currently split into 2 volumes, each volume corresponding to the 2 albums released by the band, Costello Music and Here We Stand. The volumes started before the release of their album and have continued to have songs added to them. However, there has been no update to the second volume for over a year. Each volume also contains a sampler of their respective album, which are always at the bottom of the track listing of the album.

Although the Budhill Singles Club is a virtual album, there have been 3 physical releases from the album. The first 2 releases were limited edition Budhill Single CDs for Volume 1, these were released with the "Henrietta" and "Whistle For The Choir" singles. Each one contained a blank CD with the Budhill Singles stamp on to burn selected songs onto. There was also a sleeve to keep the CD release of the single (which had to be purchased). The third release was for Volume 2 and was a limited edition boxset which came with a limited 7" vinyl of first song "Headcase", the boxset could contain the 7"s from the rest of the Here We Stand singles.

All of the tracks are on the members area of The Fratellis' website and are available at no cost. Each track must be downloaded individually from the site. So far, all of the physical releases have also been free of charge, but were on a first come, first served basis to those who wanted them by signing a form provided on the website.

== Track listings ==
=== Download from The Fratellis' website ===
All tracks are written by The Fratellis

Volume 1 was released alongside Costello Music
No.	Title	Length
1.	"Got Ma Nuts From A Hippy (Demo)"	3:21
2.	"Creepin' Up the Backstairs (Acoustic)"	3:11
3.	"Henrietta (Live from SXSW 2006)"	3:38
4.	"Cigarello (Acoustic)"	2:48
5.	"Cuntry Boys and City Girls (Demo)"	3:31
6.	"For the Girl (Acoustic)"	3:02
7.	"Baby Fratelli (Acoustic)"	4:15
8.	"Ole Black 'n' Blue Eyes (Acoustic)"	3:13
9.	"Too Much Talk In Tokyo"	3:25
10.	"Nina (Acoustic)"	2:47
11.	"Costello Music (Album sampler)"	7:30

Volume 2 was released alongside Here We Stand
No.	Title	Length
1.	"Headcase"	3:20
2.	"A Heady Tale (Acoustic)"	5:10
3.	"Lupe Brown (Alternate Version)"	4:15
4.	"Here We Stand (Album Sampler)"	9:00

=== Physical releases ===
Limited Edition Henrietta Budhill Single CD
No.	Title	Length
1.	"Got Ma Nuts From A Hippy (Demo)"	3:21
2.	"Creepin' Up the Backstairs (Acoustic)"	3:11
3.	"Henrietta (Live from SXSW 2006)"	3:38

Limited Edition Whistle For The Choir Budhill Single CD
No.	Title	Length
1.	"Cigarello (Acoustic)"	2:48
2.	"Cuntry Boys and City Girls (Demo)"	3:31
3.	"For the Girl (Acoustic)"	3:02

Limited Edition Here We Stand Boxset and Limited 7" Vinyl
No.	Title	Length
1.	"Headcase"	3:20

== Personnel ==
- Jon Fratelli – guitar, piano, vocals
- Barry Fratelli – bass guitar
- Mince Fratelli – drums
