= Baby Fratelli =

2007 single by the Fratellis

Single by the Fratellis

from the album Costello Music
- Released: 12 March 2007
- Length: 3:56
- Label: Fallout, Drop the Gun, Island
- Songwriter: Jon Fratelli
- Producer: Tony Hoffer

The Fratellis singles chronology
"Flathead" (2007)	"Baby Fratelli" (2007)	"Ole Black 'N' Blue Eyes" (2007)

"Baby Fratelli" is a song by Scottish rock band the Fratellis, released as the fifth single from their debut album, Costello Music (2006). It was released on 12 March 2007, in CD, 7-inch vinyl, and DVD single formats. A limited edition USB stick was later released, containing a weblink to an exclusive documentary as well as a competition to see the Fratellis in New York City on 23 March 2007. 7,000 copies of the USB stick format were sold, although this format isn't chart-eligible. The song was written by the band's lead singer, John Lawler.

Time magazine named "Baby Fratelli" one of "The 10 Best Songs of 2007", ranking it at number 10. Writer Josh Tyrangiel, while criticizing the band's lack of originality, and the derivativeness of the song, praised the "unapologetically glammed up, eight ball of a rock song", which he called "a high-energy ode to the thrill of stupidity, thus its prominent place on the Hot Fuzz soundtrack."

Despite only charting at number 24 in the UK Singles Chart—mainly due to the 7,000 USB stick copies unable to register in the charts—the single received significant airplay on contemporary radio stations. It was also the Fratellis' third single to reach number two in their native Scotland. The video was filmed in Manchester in December 2006 and shows the Fratellis playing on the roof of the Asia House apartment building on Princess Street, as well as showing clips from the 2007 movie Hot Fuzz, which features "Baby Fratelli" on its soundtrack.

== Track listings ==
CD single
No.	Title	Length
1.	"Baby Fratelli"
2.	"Ooh La Hot Love" (live from Glasgow Barrowlands)

8-inch limited-edition shaped picture disc
No.	Title	Length
1.	"Baby Fratelli"
2.	"Solid Gold Easy Action" (T. Rex cover)

Limited-edition USB stick
No.	Title	Length
1.	"Baby Fratelli" (audio)
2.	"Baby Fratelli" (video)

DVD single
No.	Title	Length
1.	"Baby Fratelli" (live from Glasgow Barrowlands video)
2.	"Chelsea Dagger" (live from Glasgow Barrowlands video)
3.	"Baby Fratelli" (radio edit)
4.	"Whistle for the Choir" (live from Glasgow Barrowlands)
5.	"Henrietta" (live from Glasgow Barrowlands)
6.	"Bonus Photo Gallery"

== Charts ==
Chart (2007)	Peak position
Scottish Singles Sales (Official Charts)	2
UK Singles (Official Charts)	24

== In popular culture ==
The song was featured in the season two intro of the NBC comedy series Community.
