= In Your Own Sweet Time =

Studio album by The Fratellis
- Released: 16 March 2018
- Recorded: 2017
- Studio: The Hobby Shop Recording Studios, Los Angeles
- Genre: Alternative rock
- Length: 46:20
- Label: Cooking Vinyl
- Producer: Tony Hoffer

The Fratellis chronology
Eyes Wide, Tongue Tied (2015)	In Your Own Sweet Time (2018)	Half Drunk Under a Full Moon (2021)

Singles from In Your Own Sweet Time
- 1. "The Next Time We Wed" Released: 3 November 2017; 2. "Stand Up Tragedy" Released: 29 November 2017; 3. "I've Been Blind" Released: 12 January 2018; 4. "Starcrossed Losers" Released: 8 February 2018; 5. "Laughing Gas" Released: 30 July 2018

Professional ratings
Aggregate scores
Source	Rating
Metacritic	65/100
Review scores
Source	Rating
AllMusic	3/5 stars
Daily Express	4/5 stars
Exclaim!	6/10 stars
The Independent	3/5 stars
PopMatters	7/10 stars
The Spill Magazine	3.5/5 stars

In Your Own Sweet Time is the fifth studio album by Scottish rock band, The Fratellis. The album was released on 16 March 2018. As well as being released on the standard formats of CD, digital download and vinyl, the band also released a limited edition orange vinyl and cassette available from their official online store.

== Background and recording ==
After touring the 10th anniversary of their debut album Costello Music, the band started work on their fifth studio album. They flew out to Los Angeles for six weeks to reunite with their producer (Tony Hoffer), who also produced their previous album Eyes Wide, Tongue Tied, as well as Jon's solo Psycho Jukebox. Taking with them only 12 songs, the fewest they have taken to record with, the band eventually returned home to play shows over the summer period, before announcing the album in November 2017, with a March 2018 release date. For unknown reasons, the album was pushed back a week from 9 March to 16 March.

== Track listing ==
All lyrics are written by Jon Fratelli; all music is composed by Jon Fratelli, except where noted.

No.	Title	Music	Length
1.	"Stand Up Tragedy"		3:45
2.	"Starcrossed Losers"	Jon Fratelli, Will Foster	4:31
3.	"Sugartown"		3:55
4.	"Told You So"		4:02
5.	"The Next Time We Wed"		3:24
6.	"I've Been Blind"		3:14
7.	"Laughing Gas"		4:05
8.	"Advaita Shuffle"		4:25
9.	"I Guess... I Suppose..."		3:58
10.	"Indestructible"		4:06
11.	"I Am That"		6:55
Total length:			46:20

Japanese edition bonus tracks
No.	Title	Length
12.	"Let's Go!"	5:11
13.	"Stand Up Tragedy" (Acoustic)	4:06
14.	"Laughing Gas" (Acoustic)	4:58
Total length:		60:43

== Personnel ==
The Fratellis

- Jon Fratelli – vocals, guitars, keyboards
- Barry Fratelli – bass
- Mince Fratelli – drums, percussion

Additional musicians

- Stevie Black – strings (tracks 2 and 11), esraj (track 11)
- Tony Hoffer – production, mixing, additional keyboards (track 1, 4, 6, 9, 11)

Production

- Will Foster – orchestral score (track 2)
- Cameron Lister – engineering
- Dave Cooley – mastering

Design

- Ben Brown – cover art
- Jamie Farrell – design

== Charts ==
Chart (2018)	Peak position
Japanese Albums (Oricon)	182
Scottish Albums (OCC)	2
UK Albums (OCC)	5
