= Eyes Wide, Tongue Tied =

Studio album by The Fratellis
- Released: 21 August 2015
- Recorded: November 2014
- Genre: Alternative rock
- Length: 44:58
- Label: Cooking Vinyl
- Producer: Tony Hoffer

The Fratellis chronology
We Need Medicine (2013)	Eyes Wide, Tongue Tied (2015)	In Your Own Sweet Time (2018)

Singles from Eyes Wide, Tongue Tied
- 1. "Baby Don't You Lie to Me" Released: 29 June 2015; 2. "Impostors (Little by Little)" Released: 12 September 2015

Eyes Wide, Tongue Tied is the fourth album by the Scottish rock band The Fratellis. The album was announced on 1 June 2015 with the first track, "Me and the Devil" (which was given away for free from the band's website), and released on 21 August 2015. The album was written and recorded in Los Angeles during November 2014 with Tony Hoffer, who also produced the band's first album Costello Music and Jon Fratelli's solo album Psycho Jukebox.

== Recording ==
After the release of The Soul Crush EP in September 2014, and the band's first shows in Russia, it was announced that they would go to Los Angeles to record the follow-up to We Need Medicine. During the tour for that album, the band debuted the new songs "All the Livelong Day", which later became "Impostors (Little By Little)" and "Too Much Wine". They went to record the new album during January 2014, and after various attempts they gave up and decided to bring back Tony Hoffer. During that session, "Me and the Devil" was the third song to make it onto the record. Every other song was discarded for the time being.

"Rosanna" uses the same melody as a track released for free on Codeine Velvet Club's website called "Mellotron Boogie No 3". Jon Fratelli said at the time that it would probably find its place somewhere one day. The title of the album comes from the bonus track "Medusa In Chains".

Professional ratings
Review scores
Source	Rating
AllMusic	3.5/5 stars
New York Daily News	4/5 stars
The Spill Magazine	4/5 stars
NME	3/5 stars
The Guardian	3/5 stars

== Track listing ==
All tracks are written by Jon Fratelli and Tony Hoffer.

No.	Title	Length
1.	"Me and the Devil"	5:37
2.	"Impostors (Little by Little)"	3:38
3.	"Baby Don't You Lie to Me"	3:47
4.	"Desperate Guy"	3:38
5.	"Thief"	3:27
6.	"Dogtown"	3:43
7.	"Rosanna"	3:31
8.	"Slow"	4:41
9.	"Getting Surreal"	3:52
10.	"Too Much Wine"	4:02
11.	"Moonshine"	3:41
Total length:		44:58

Deluxe version bonus tracks
No.	Title	Length
12.	"Down the Road and Back... Again"	3:16
13.	"Medusa in Chains"	3:13
14.	"Impostors (Little by Little)" (acoustic version)	3:50
15.	"Desperate Guy" (acoustic version)	3:40
16.	"Rosanna" (acoustic version)	4:09
17.	"Slow" (acoustic version)	4:48
18.	"Moonshine" (acoustic version)	3:34
19.	"Boy Scout to the End" (iTunes bonus track only)	3:53

Japanese bonus tracks
No.	Title	Length
20.	"I Know Your Kind"	4:23
21.	"I'm Gonna Be Your Elvis"	3:44

== Personnel ==
Band

- Jon Fratelli – guitar and vocals, piano
- Barry Fratelli – bass guitar and backing vocals (tracks 1–13, 19–21)
- Mince Fratelli – drums and backing vocals (tracks 1–13, 19–21)

Additional musicians

- Will Foster – piano and keyboards on "I Know Your Kind" and "I'm Gonna Be Your Elvis"

Production (tracks 1–13)

- Tony Hoffer – producer
- Tony Hoffer – mixer
- Cameron Lister – engineer
- Dave Cooley – mastering
- Recorded at The Hobby Shop Recording Studios, Los Angeles

Production (tracks 14–21)

- Stuart McCredie – producer and mixing
- Dean Honer – mastering (tracks 14–18)
- Callum Malcolm – mastering (tracks 19–21)

== Charts ==
Chart (2015)	Peak position
UK Albums (Official Charts)	16
