= Half Drunk Under a Full Moon =

Studio album by The Fratellis
- Released: 2 April 2021
- Recorded: 2019–2021
- Genre: Baroque pop, chamber pop
- Length: 42:05
- Label: Cooking Vinyl
- Producer: Tony Hoffer

The Fratellis chronology
In Your Own Sweet Time (2018)	Half Drunk Under a Full Moon (2021)

Singles from Half Drunk Under a Full Moon
- 1. "Six Days in June" Released: 21 February 2020; 2. "Action Replay" Released: 8 January 2021; 3. "Need a Little Love" Released: 12 February 2021; 4. "Half Drunk Under a Full Moon" Released: 19 March 2021

Professional ratings
Review scores
Source	Rating
Classic Rock Germany	7/10
Gigwise	8/10 stars
NME	3/5 stars
Riff Magazine	9/10
The Upcoming	3/5 stars

Half Drunk Under a Full Moon is the sixth studio album by Scottish rock band the Fratellis. The album was released on 2 April 2021, having been delayed by a year due to the COVID-19 pandemic.

== Background ==
In contrast to the more rock-oriented music of previous albums, Half Drunk Under a Full Moon features a baroque pop sound with considerable use of brass and strings. Guitarist and vocalist Jon Fratelli had previously sought this approach on their debut album's most successful single, "Chelsea Dagger": "I wasn't mad keen on going down the road of the chant vocals. I really wanted to have a New Orleans big band playing. But Tony Hoffer, our producer, had us doing multiple vocal takes from all around the studio."

In addition to the album's delay, the COVID-19 pandemic caused multiple cancellations of the supporting tour. This prompted the band to organise a series of small-scale shows at independent record stores, with all proceeds going to the stores themselves and to the band's crew. On 2 April 2021, the band released a non-album cover of Baccara's 1977 single "Yes Sir, I Can Boogie" and donated all proceeds to the Tartan Army Children's Charity, Soccer Aid and the Eilidh Brown Memorial Fund. This was one of two covers released in conjunction with the album, the other being a studio recording of Dion's 1961 single "Runaround Sue" with which the band had been closing concerts for several years.

== Track listing ==
All lyrics are written by Jon Fratelli, except where noted.

No.	Title	Length
1.	"Half Drunk Under a Full Moon"	5:34
2.	"Need a Little Love"	3:49
3.	"Lay Your Body Down"	3:48
4.	"The Last Songbird"	4:01
5.	"Strangers in the Street"	3:28
6.	"Living in the Dark"	3:09
7.	"Action Replay"	4:10
8.	"Six Days in June"	3:41
9.	"Oh Roxy"	4:17
10.	"Hello Stranger"	6:16
Total length:		42:05

Japanese edition bonus tracks
No.	Title	Length
11.	"Need a Little Love" (The Skeletonic Sessions)	3:58
12.	"Lay Your Body Down" (Sloe Gin Version)	4:32
Total length:		50:44

Bonus tracks on the deluxe edition
No.	Title	Writer(s)	Length
11.	"Runaround Sue"	Dion DiMucci, Ernie Maresca	3:11
12.	"Alive"		4:05
13.	"Closing Time Again"		3:12
14.	"Need a Little Love" (The Skeletonic Sessions)		3:12
15.	"Laughing Gas" (For Leonard)		5:12
16.	"Lay Your Body Down" (Sloe Gin Version)		4:32
17.	"Hello Stranger" (Old Fashioned Version)		6:28
18.	"Yes Sir, I Can Boogie"	Frank Dostal, Rolf Soja	4:37
Total length:			82:40

== Personnel ==
The Fratellis

- Jon Fratelli – vocals, guitars, keyboards
- Barry Fratelli – bass
- Mince Fratelli – drums

Additional musicians

- Will Foster – orchestral score (tracks 1, 2, 6, 7)
- Mark Lesseraux - backing vocals (track 1)
- Roger J. Manning Jnr - backing vocals (tracks 1, 3, 4, 6, 7, 9)

Production

- Tony Hoffer – production, mixing, programming
- Cameron Lister – engineering
- Dave Cooley – mastering

Additional Personnel

- Manager: Anthony McGill @ Numb Music

Design

- David Eustace – photography

== Charts ==
Chart (2021)	Peak position
Scottish Albums (OCC)	3
UK Albums (OCC)	12
UK Album Downloads (OCC)	4
UK Independent Albums (OCC)	2
