= Codeine Velvet Club (album) =

Studio album by Codeine Velvet Club
- Released: 28 December 2009
- Recorded: 2009
- Genre: Baroque pop
- Length: 37:17
- Label: Island, Dangerbird
- Producer: Jon Fratelli, Stuart McCredie

Singles from Codeine Velvet Club
- 1. "Vanity Kills" Released: 23 November 2009; 2. "Hollywood/I Am the Resurrection" Released: 28 December 2009

Codeine Velvet Club is the debut, and only, studio album by Codeine Velvet Club. It was released on 28 December 2009 by Island Records in the United Kingdom and was released on 6 April 2010 by Dangerbird Records in the United States.

== Background and release ==
Professional ratings
Review scores
Source	Rating
Allmusic	3.5/5 stars
Scotsman	4/5 stars
The Times	3/5 stars
BBC	(favourable)

The album was produced by John Lawler and Stuart McCredie and mixed by Tony Hoffer (who produced The Fratellis' debut album Costello Music) and was recorded at Terminal Music in Glasgow, Playground Studios in Glasgow and Angel Recording Studios in London. The album was written by Jon Lawler (with some tracks written by Lou Hickey and Will Foster).

The album was originally meant to be released on 23 November, but was pushed back as the band were a little unhappy with aspects of the album and wanted to change them. However, on the Vic Galloway show, Lawler stated that it was silly to release the album before the tour, meaning changes might not have been made. The album was accidentally released for Digital Download on 16 November from Amazon, HMV and Play.com, but was later removed.

== Composition ==
In the track by track, Lawler reveals information about each tack. "I Would Send You Roses" was originally written for a collaboration between The Fratellis and Roger Daltrey, but the collaboration never went ahead and so it was used for this. "Begging Bowl Blues" features no vocals from Lou Hickey as the song didn't suit her voice. Lawler was also keen to point out the variety of instruments used and how each song has a unique sound.

== Track listing ==
No.	Title	Writer(s)	Length
1.	"Hollywood"	John Lawler	4:01
2.	"Vanity Kills"	Lawler, Lou Hickey	3:30
3.	"Time"	Lawler, Hickey	3:50
4.	"The Black Roses"	Lawler, Hickey	3:26
5.	"Little Sister"	Lawler	2:32
6.	"Nevada"	Lawler, Will Foster	3:35
7.	"Reste Avec Moi"	Lawler, Hickey	4:07
8.	"I Would Send You Roses"	Lawler	3:53
9.	"Like a Full Moon"	Lawler	3:28
10.	"Begging Bowl Blues"	Lawler	4:52
11.	"I Am the Resurrection (Bonus Track)"	Ian Brown and John Squire	4:52

iTunes Digital Download (Great Britain only)
No.	Title	Writer(s)	Length
12.	"Hollywood (Live)"	Lawler	4:00
13.	"I Wish My Daddy"	Lawler, Hickey	2:59

== Personnel ==
Codeine Velvet Club

- John Lawler – Guitar, Bass, Vocals
- Lou Hickey – Vocals

Featuring

- Ross McFarlane - Drums (Tracks 1, 6–11)
- Affy Ahmad - Drums (Tracks 2, 4 and 5)
- Helen MacLeod - Harp (Tracks 2, 3, 6 and 7)
- The Gospel Truth Choir (Tracks 3 and 4)
- Ed McFarlane - Double Bass (Track 4)
- Mick Cooke - Trumpet (Track 4)
- Allan Cuthbertson - Piano (Track 8)
- Will Foster - Keys (Track 11)
- Lewis Gordon - Bass (Track 11)

Additional Personnel

- Rick Wentworth - Conductor
- Perry Montague-Mason - String Leader
- Derek Watkins - Solo Trumpet
- Mark Nightingale - Solo Trombone
- Mick Cooke - Orchestral Arrangements

Production

- John Lawler and Stuart McCredie - Producer
- Tony Hoffer - Mixing
- Stuart McCredie - Engineer, assisted by Niall McMenamin
- Ian Cooper - Mastering
- Recorded at Terminal Music, Glasgow; Playground Studios, Glasgow; Angel Recording Studios, London
- Isobel Griffiths - Musicians' Contractor
- Lucy Whalley - Assistant Musicians' Contractor

Publishing

- Published by EMI Music Publishing
- Mike Dewdney @ ITB - Booking Agent
- John Squire and Ian Brown - Writers of "I Am the Resurrection"
- M. Grant @ Infinite Thrill - Design, Logo and Photography
- Jay Brooks - Band Portrait

== Members downloads ==
In a similar fashion to the Fratellis' Budhill Singles Club, Codeine Velvet Club are releasing free song downloads on their website for members of the site. The downloads are untitled, unlike the Budhill Singles Club. Listed below are the tracks that have been released on this section.

1. "Nevada" (Acoustic Version) - 3:34
2. "Little Sister" (Live Studio Version) - 2:28
3. "Mellotron Boogie No 3" (Instrumental) - 2:39
4. "I Am the Resurrection" (Cover Version) - 4:52

== Release history ==
Region	Date	Format
United Kingdom	28 December 2009	CD, Download
