= Flathead =

Flathead(s) or flat-head may refer to:

== Arts and entertainment ==
- "Flathead" EP, by The Fratellis
  - "Flathead" (song), by The Fratellis
- Flathead (film), a 2024 Australian film
- The ruling family of the Great Underground Empire in the Zork adventure game series, such as Zork Zero

== Peoples ==
- Bitterroot Salish, or Flathead people, one of three tribes of the Confederated Salish and Kootenai Tribes of the Flathead Nation in Montana
- Choctaw, a southeastern Native American group also known as the Flatheads
- Confederated Salish and Kootenai Tribes of the Flathead Nation, known as the Flathead, or Flathead Indian (or Amerindian) tribe

== Places ==
- Flathead Valley, also known as The Flathead, a region of the U.S. state of Montana
  - Flathead County, Montana
  - Flathead High School, a school in Kalispell, Montana
  - Flathead Indian Reservation, Montana
  - Flathead Lake, Montana
  - Flathead National Forest, Montana
  - Flathead River, Montana

== Technology ==
- Flathead engine, a valve configuration
- Flat-head screw, a screw with a flat top, designed to be installed in a countersunk hole
- Flat-head screwdriver, a screwdriver designed to turn slotted screws

== Zoology ==
=== Fish ===
- Platycephalidae, a family of fish known as flatheads
  - Flathead (fish), various species of fish in this family
- Flathead catfish (Pylodictis olivaris), a species of fish found in North America
- Flathead grey mullet (Mugil cephalus), a fish species in the mullet family Mugilidae, widespread
- Flat-headed loach (Oreonectes platycephalus), a species of cyprinid fish
- Pseudaphritis urvillii, species of fish also known as freshwater flathead and marbled flathead

=== Other animals ===
- Flat-headed cat, a small wild cat
- Flat-headed frog (Limnodynastes depressus), a species of frog found in Australia
- Flat-headed kusimanse (Crossarchus platycephalus), a species of mongoose found in West Africa
- Flat-headed myotis (Myotis planiceps), a species of vesper bat found in Mexico
- Flat-headed salamander (Desmognathus planiceps), a species of salamander found in the US
- Flat-headed shrew (Crocidura planiceps), a species of mammal found in Africa

== Other uses ==
- The Flathead gang, also known as The Flatheads, a group of bank robbers led by Paul Jaworski

== See also ==
- Plagiocephaly, a medical condition also known as "flat head syndrome"
