= Codeine Velvet Club =

Scottish alternative rock band

Background information
- Origin: Glasgow, Scotland
- Genres: Alternative rock, baroque pop, cabaret
- Years active: 2009–2010
- Labels: Island, Dangerbird, MapleMusic Recordings (Canada)
- Members: Jon Lawler; Lou Hickey

Codeine Velvet Club was a Scottish alternative rock band formed in 2009 by Lou Hickey and John Lawler, while Lawler's band The Fratellis were taking a hiatus after their second album Here We Stand. Codeine Velvet Club's sole album, their self titled debut album was released on 28 December 2009 in the UK and on 6 April 2010 in the US.

After releasing their album and playing a string of live dates, in early 2010 it was announced the band would not continue beyond their scheduled tour dates. After the band disbanded, Lawler took the backing band to work on a solo project and Hickey returned to her solo career.

== History ==
=== 2008-2009: Formation ===
During 2008, John Lawler (better known as Jon Fratelli) mentioned in interviews around their second album Here We Stand that he wanted to release a solo record to "keep himself busy" between Fratellis albums, indicating that the band were going to enter into a hiatus. After the Fratellis finished their touring commitments in July 2009, Lawler was free to begin working on new projects. It was soon discovered that Lawler had formed a band with Lou Hickey, who worked alongside Lawler's wife at Club Noir, a regular burlesque night that took place in Glasgow. The band was originally reported to be called 'Codeine Breakfast Club', but Lawler joked that the name couldn't be used as "John Hughes owns anything to do with the name the Breakfast Club".

=== 2009-2010: Codeine Velvet Club and tour ===
The band revealed its existence to the world in August 2009, revealing themselves as Codeine Velvet Club alongside their eponymous debut album which was scheduled for release on 16 November 2009 (later delayed until 28 December 2009). The band unveiled their first offering via a rudimentary website, which featured a live rehearsal clip of their debut single "Vanity Kills". Fans were encouraged to sign up to the band's mailing list to unlock the full performance of the song. Initial tour dates were revealed for their debut shows in September 2009, alongside a second live rehearsal video of their future single "Hollywood". Their initial shows received positive reviews, complimenting the duo's vocals and the musical arrangements.

The band unveiled their full website debuted on 28 September 2009, which included a new "Member's Only Club" which allowed members to download an acoustic version of their song "Nevada" for free. More tour dates were then confirmed, including a slot at "Homecoming Live: The Final Fling", taking place at the Glasgow SECC on 28 November 2009 and their first full UK Tour, which stopped at various club venues across the UK.

The band unveiled their video for debut single "Vanity Kills" on YouTube on 11 November 2009, along with a new download for their member's club called "Mellotron Boogie No 3" which was explained by Jon to be an instrumental he was working on around the time came together and that he "liked the odd combination of notes that make up the melody and i'm pretty sure that one day it'll find it's [sic] way somewhere that makes a bit of sense" but stating "in the meantime it is what it is!". This would later go on to form the basis of the Fratellis' song "Rosanna" from their fourth album, Eyes Wide, Tongue Tied.

The "Vanity Kills" single was released on all formats on 23 November 2009, with the announcement that the band's album was to be pushed back to 28 December 2009, Jon explained that the release date was pushed back due to changes that the band wanted to make to the album, although no such changes were reported to take place as the album was briefly available to purchase on the original release date. The second single was announced to be "Hollywood" which was a double A-Side with the band's unique take of The Stone Roses' "I Am the Resurrection". This was offered as a free download from NME and the band's member's club from 23 November 2009.

The band started 2010 with a support slot on John Mayer's tour from 15 to 19 January, playing Manchester, Glasgow, London and Wolverhampton before announcing their first trip to the US to play the SXSW festival and also to play shows to support Metric.

The band also announced their album to be released on 6 April 2010 on Dangerbird Records and will feature a brand new song as a bonus track called "Midnight Love Song". This song will also be released with their re-release of "Vanity Kills" on 5 April 2010. This re-release will only be a digital download.

The band's single "Hollywood" was nominated for an MTVU Award in 2010 for "Best Music Video". In March 2010, the band released their debut album in the United States. The band will play live in the Kilmarnock Grand Hall on 22 May 2010 as one of the main headliners of the night to celebrate the refurbishment of the music venue in the town. They were also confirmed as the headliners of the Lovebox Festival in London on 17 July 2010. Other acts booked for the festival include, Dizzee Rascal, Roxy Music, Grace Jones and Hot Chip. The band also announced that they will play their first ever show in Romania at the Becksperience Festival in Bucharest on 29 May 2010.

=== 2010: Split and solo projects ===
John Lawler initially stated that the band have begun work on material for the second album, but has since stated that he will leave Codeine Velvet Club along with the touring band members to start a new career as a solo artist. Lou continued as a solo artist and has recorded her debut album, True Love Ways, using her grant from the Scottish Arts Council, and released it in May 2010. She had a week-long session to record most of the album, with extra sessions being squeezed in when she could. As with her previous EPs, Lou has produced, engineered and mixed the album. There was an analog release of an edition of 550 records by Vinyl Frontier Records on Record Store Day, 29 November 2013.

== Discography ==
=== Studio albums ===
- Codeine Velvet Club (28 December 2009)

=== Singles ===
- "Vanity Kills" (23 November 2009)
- "Hollywood / I Am the Resurrection" (28 December 2009)
- "Vanity Kills" (Re-Release) (5 April 2010)

== Awards and nominations ==
Year	Nominated work	Award	Result
2009	Codeine Velvet Club (band)	5th Scottish Style Awards 2009	Won

== Band members ==
Codeine Velvet Club

- John Lawler – guitars, vocals
- Lou Hickey – vocals

Additional touring musicians

- Ross McFarlane – drums
- Will Foster – keyboards, guitars
- Lewis Gordon – bass
- Ryan Quigley – trumpet
- Cameron Jay – trumpet
- Paul Towndrow – saxophones
- John Melone – saxophone
