= Hollywood/I Am the Resurrection =

"Hollywood / I Am the Resurrection"

Single by Codeine Velvet Club

from the album Codeine Velvet Club
- Released: 28 December 2009
- Recorded: 2009
- Genre: Alternative/Rock
- Length: 4:01
- Label: Island
- Songwriter(s): Jon Lawler (Hollywood); Ian Brown, John Squire (I Am the Resurrection)
- Producer(s): Jon Lawler and Stuart McCreadie

Codeine Velvet Club singles chronology
"Vanity Kills" (2009)	"Hollywood / I Am the Resurrection" (2009)	""Vanity Kills" (Re-Release)" (2010)

Hollywood / I Am the Resurrection is the second single release by Scottish alternative rock band Codeine Velvet Club from their 2009 debut album Codeine Velvet Club. It is a double A-Side with their cover of The Stone Roses' "I Am the Resurrection". The song was released on 28 December 2009, the same day as their debut album. "I Am the Resurrection" went on to be added as a bonus track on the band's debut album.

== Promotion ==
To promote the track, Codeine Velvet Club posted a video of the band performing the song in the studio on September 6, 2009 along with various of tracks from the album. An official video has been released and can be viewed on their website or the Island Records Channel on YouTube. It depicts the band performing "Hollywood" to an empty hall, with the exception of the woman from the album and single covers watching. The band opened each gig of their 2009 UK tour with this song.

== Track listing ==
7" Vinyl and Digital Download
No.	Title	Length
1.	"Hollywood"	4:01
2.	"I Am the Resurrection"	4:52

== Artwork ==
The single's artwork continues the theme found on the album's cover and the previous single's ("Vanity Kills") cover. Depicting a woman in raincoat and sunglasses. The artwork also resembles the artwork of The Stone Roses' artwork for their I Am the Resurrection single.
