= Flathead EP =

EP by The Fratellis
- Released: 23 January 2007
- Recorded: 2006
- Genre: Indie rock
- Length: 13:12
- Label: Universal-Island Records
- Producer: Tony Hoffer

The Fratellis chronology
The Fratellis EP (2006)	Flathead EP (2007)	Ole Black 'n' Blue Eyes EP (2007)

Flathead EP is an EP released only in the US by Scottish band The Fratellis. It was released physically in American music shops on 23 January 2007, and was previously available on the iTunes Music Store in America from 19 December 2006. Additionally, the song Flathead has been used in iTunes Television Commercials.

The EP consists of two album tracks, (Henrietta & Flathead) and two B-sides released on the singles in the UK – Stacie Anne was on The Fratellis EP and Cigarello was the B-side to Henrietta.

== Track listing ==
CD
No.	Title	Length
1.	"Flathead"	3:17
2.	"Henrietta"	3:31
3.	"Stacie Anne"	3:20
4.	"Cigarello"	3:04
