= Vanity Kills (Codeine Velvet Club song) =

Single by Codeine Velvet Club

from the album Codeine Velvet Club
- Released: 7 November 2009 (Download); 23 November 2009 (All Formats); 5 April 2010 (Digital Re-Release)
- Recorded: 2009
- Genre: Alternative/Rock
- Length: 3:35
- Label: Island
- Songwriters: Jon Lawler and Lou Hickey
- Producers: Jon Lawler and Stuart McCreadie

Codeine Velvet Club singles chronology
"Vanity Kills" (2009)	"Hollywood / I Am the Resurrection" (2009)

Vanity Kills is the debut single by Scottish rock band Codeine Velvet Club taken from their debut album Codeine Velvet Club. The song was released digitally on 2 November 2009 and on 7" Vinyl on 23 November 2009. It was re-released on 5 April 2010 with a brand new track "Midnight Love Song".

== Track listing ==
7" Coloured Vinyl
No.	Title	Length
1.	"Vanity Kills"	3:30
2.	"Delight in Disorder"	3:18

Digital Download
No.	Title	Length
1.	"Vanity Kills"	3:30
2.	"Delight in Disorder"	3:18
3.	"Vanity Kills (Live Studio Version)"	3:44

Some digital download versions, including iTunes and Amazon have incorrectly listed the B-side track as "Delight and Disorder". "Delight In Disorder" was written by Lou Hickey.

Digital Re-Release
No.	Title	Length
1.	"Vanity Kills"	3:30
2.	"Midnight Love Song"	3:57

"Midnight Love Song" was written by Jon Lawler.

== Music video ==
The band used a live studio version to promote the song, but have since created an official promo video for the song, in the style of a short film. The video starts with a prologue by band member Jon Lawler, where he says: "Vanity is defined as excessive pride in one's self, in your looks, and your job, and your achievements. Pride itself is not easy to pin down. In the bible, pride was known as the deadliest of the seven deadly sins. And now it's a virtue. Times change and that's about all you can count on, but still, I'm not casting stones, we all linger in the mirror sometimes."

The video shows the story of Miss Vanity and Mr Kills. Miss Vanity is seen lying on a bed, reading a magazine with a picture of a gentleman and his girlfriend, the headline reading "I won't let her down again". Mr Kills enters the room saying "Got you a little present", inside the present is a seductive dress, similar to the one worn by a woman in a magazine clipping. Mr Kills then says to her, "Hope he likes it". Later on, Mr Kills is seen working behind the bar in the club where Jon and Lou are playing, when Miss Vanity enters wearing the dress she was bought. The gentleman who was in the picture of the magazine is enticed by her as soon as she enters, even removing his wedding ring and approaching her at the bar. After talking and laughing, they are next seen in a bedroom, and begin to make out, before having intercourse, the gentleman unaware the entire thing is being filmed and watched by Mr Kills.

They later meet him in a carpark, giving him the magazine clipping and a copy of the tape, wanting money from the gentleman to stop them from showing the video to his wife. Miss Vanity is then seen packing her bags at their home and appears to be waiting for someone. The gentleman meets Mr Kills in the car park with a briefcase, which he places down in front of him, as Mr Kills proceeds to collect the suitcase, the lights of the BMW parked turn on and a brunette woman appears, and shoots both Mr Kills and the gentleman and takes the suitcase, which is full of £20 notes, and Miss Vanity is shown looking pleased. Jon Lawler then gives an epilogue: "One thing I do know, flip Vanity's head, and the tail leads to envy. And she gets into your blood stream, she'll turn your grey matter green. And then you got problems, like these folk here". During this, Lou and Jon finish their performance at the club, and go and find Miss Vanity and her female lover in their hotel room, with Jon flashing a police badge.

== Credits ==
- Engineer [Assistant] - Nial McMenanmin
- Mastered By - Ian Cooper
- Mixed By - Tony Hoffer
- Producer, Engineer - Stuart McCredie
- Producer, Written-By - Jon Lawler
- Written-By - Lou Hickey
