= Bright Night Flowers =

Studio album by Jon Fratelli
- Released: 15 February 2019
- Recorded: 2011–2012, 2018
- Length: 46:19
- Label: Cooking Vinyl
- Producer: Jon Fratelli; Stuart McCredie

Singles from Bright Night Flowers
- 1. "Bright Night Flowers" Released: 30 October 2018; 2. "Dreams Don't Remember Your Name" Released: 7 December 2018

Bright Night Flowers reviews
Review scores
Source	Rating
AllMusic	4/5
The Edge	4/5
Hot Press	8/10
New Noise	5/5
The Spill Magazine	4/5

Bright Night Flowers is the second solo album by Jon Fratelli, frontman of The Fratellis. It was released on February 15, 2019, by Cooking Vinyl. As well as being released on the standard formats of digital download, CD and standard black vinyl, the album also released a limited edition purple vinyl available from their official online store. It was co-produced by Stuart McCredie, who also produced Codeine Velvet Club.

== Background ==
After releasing his debut album Psycho Jukebox in 2011, pictures emerged on Lawler's Facebook page, showing him in the studio. On January 13, 2012 Lawler stated that these sessions were for a second solo album, as posted on Lawler's website. The post also gave a small 3 track peek at the album. On 24 February 2012, Lawler announced on his website and Facebook that he had almost completed the album and that it was going to be titled Bright Night Flowers. It was later announced that he had completed the album, but it would be put to one side for the time being as he was recording a new album and focusing on with the Fratellis.

In a March 2018 interview with Wired Noise, Jon revealed that he had re-recorded Bright Night Flowers and had possibly changed his stance on releasing it. "Yeah, I did that over the summer. [It] still needs to be mixed, and then I guess at some point, if somebody wants to release it, it’ll find its way out there." During October 2018, fans had noticed that his own website had been changed to a "Coming Soon" holding page. The Fratellis tweeted out on October 23, 2018 with a reactivated account for Jon Fratelli, with a date of October 30, hinting to an announcement of Bright Night Flowers is coming soon. On October 30 it was announced that Bright Night Flowers would release on February 15, 2019. Jon also released the album's title track and accompanying video.

== Track listing ==
All tracks are written by Jon Fratelli

No.	Title	Length
1.	"Serenade in Vain"	6:34
2.	"Bright Night Flowers"	4:27
3.	"After a While"	4:30
4.	"Evangeline"	3:46
5.	"Rolling By"	4:28
6.	"Crazy Lovers Song"	5:45
7.	"Dreams Don't Remember Your Name"	4:54
8.	"In from the Cold"	5:24
9.	"Somewhere"	6:31
Total length:		46:19
