= Psycho Jukebox =

Studio album by Jon Fratelli
- Released: 25 July 2011
- Recorded: October 2010
- Genre: Indie rock, post-punk revival
- Label: Island
- Producer: Tony Hoffer

Singles from Psycho Jukebox
- 1. "Santo Domingo" Released: 28 February 2011; 2. "Baby, We're Refugees!" Released: 12 June 2011

Professional ratings
Review scores
Source	Rating
Clash	4/10
Ultimate Guitar	7.3/10
Drowned in Sound	5/10

Psycho Jukebox is the debut solo album by Jon Fratelli, frontman of The Fratellis and formerly of Codeine Velvet Club. Released on 25 July 2011. It was recorded with Tony Hoffer (who produced Costello Music and mixed Codeine Velvet Club) in the Sound Factory studios in Los Angeles.

== Recording ==
After putting the Fratellis on hiatus in 2009, Jon worked with singer/songwriter Lou Hickey on a project entitled Codeine Velvet Club. The duo recorded an album and played live during late 2009 and early 2010 before Jon announced he was departing the project to move onto a solo career. After playing a few shows (notably using musicians from Codeine Velvet Club, bar Hickey), Jon flew to LA with the band to record his debut album. He kept fans up to date on the songs he was working on via his Twitter feed. Finishing the album in November, under the working title The Magic Hour, Jon flew home and recorded an EP to release before the album. The first single was released in February 2011, called "Santo Domingo" (previously known as "Ham On Rye, named after a Charles Bukowski book") While writing, Jon decided to add a new song to the album and flew back to LA to record it. The song, "Baby, We're Refugees!" was released as the second single on 12 June 2011.

Jon has also since tried to add a song entitled "Dead Radio", but was unable to as Island locked down the dates. He has however played it live and recorded it in a stripped down form on a free podcast which is on his website.

== Track listing ==
All tracks are written by Jon Fratelli

No.	Title	Length
1.	"Tell Me Honey"	3:20
2.	"Daddy Won't Pay Your Bill"	4:01
3.	"Santo Domingo"	3:01
4.	"Rhythm Doesn't Make You a Dancer"	3:15
5.	"The Band Played Just for Me"	3:51
6.	"Magic & Mayhem"	4:00
7.	"She's My Shaker"	3:47
8.	"Cavemen"	3:30
9.	"Baby, We're Refugees!"	2:38
10.	"Oh Shangri La"	4:27
11.	"Give Me My Heart Back MacGuire"	3:45
12.	"Sometimes You Just Can't Win" (CD Bonus Track)

iTunes Bonus Tracks
No.	Title	Length
12.	"Aeroplanes" (iTunes Pre-Order Bonus Track)

A Scottish edition of the album was released with the following extra tracks. This version is also available on iTunes as the deluxe version, which also includes "Aeroplanes" as a pre-order bonus track and doesn't include "Sometimes You Just Can't Win".

Scottish Edition / iTunes Deluxe Edition
No.	Title	Length
13.	"Daddy Won't Pay You Bill" (Live at Terminal Studios, Glasgow)
14.	"Tell Me Honey" (Live at Terminal Studios, Glasgow)
15.	"Santo Domingo" (Live at Terminal Studios, Glasgow)
16.	"Rhythm Doesn't Make You a Dancer" (Live at Terminal Studios, Glasgow)
17.	"Baby, We're Refugees!" (Live at Terminal Studios, Glasgow)

== Personnel ==
Band

- Jon Fratelli - guitar, vocals
- Lewis Gordon - bass
- Ross MacFarlane - drums
- Will Foster - keyboards

Production

- Tony Hoffer - producer, mixer, programming
- Todd Burke - engineer
- Cameron Lister - assistant engineer
