= We Need Medicine =

2013 album by The Fratellis

Studio album by the Fratellis
- Released: 7 October 2013
- Recorded: November 2012 – February 2013
- Genre: Indie rock, blues rock
- Length: 44:58
- Label: BMG Rights
- Producer: Jon Fratelli, Stuart McCredie

The Fratellis chronology
Here We Stand (2008)	We Need Medicine (2013)	Eyes Wide, Tongue Tied (2015)

Singles from We Need Medicine
- 1. "Seven Nights, Seven Days" Released: 29 September 2013; 2. "She's Not Gone Yet But She's Leaving" Released: 3 February 2014

We Need Medicine is the third studio album released by Scottish rock band the Fratellis, and the first since their 2012 reunion. It was released on 7 October 2013 in the UK, with a US release the following day.

The record stalled at No. 26 on the UK Albums Chart, marking a significant decline in popularity for the band whose first two albums went Top 5, and dropped out of the Top 100 altogether after just one week.

== Critical reception ==
Professional ratings
Aggregate scores
Source	Rating
Metacritic	65/100
Review scores
Source	Rating
AllMusic	4/5 stars
Drowned in Sound	3/10
Mojo	3/5 stars
musicOMH	2/5 stars
PopMatters	7/10

Critical reaction to We Need Medicine centred on the mean, but the record had ardent supporters. Heather Phares in AllMusic wrote: "While a few songs wander too close to lunkheaded bar rock, We Need Medicine reveals a surprising amount of vitality and growth for a band that spent nearly half a decade apart. Not only is it a welcome return, it's one of The Fratellis' most consistently engaging albums." In his review for PopMatters, Charles Pitter said: "The music is thorough, raucously ragged, and the lyrics forceful… The Fratellis are quirky, and you almost have to accept that not everything will work to get to the moments of genius." Mojo, in a mildly positive review, described the record as 'simple and uncomplicated' but 'fundamentally predictable'. John D. Luerssen of Rolling Stone lauded the album's first two singles, "Seven Nights, Seven Days" and "This Old Ghost Town".

Conversely, the record was battered by Alan Ashton-Smith in musicOMH, who wrote: "The Fratellis certainly sound like a more mature band now: the problem is that rather than sounding like a group who have grown to maturity, they sound like the kind of mature band that have reformed to plod their way around the stadium and festival circuit once they've reached the wrong side of middle age… if this is a band that needs medicine then what they ought to be prescribed is medicine for the soul." Paul Faller, in a scathing review for Drowned in Sound, suggested that the band retire after completing any associated live shows. He opined: "You can look at this album in two ways—it's completely inessential at best, or a cynical cash-grab at worst. It'll be enough to keep The Fratellis ticking over with tours and festival appearances for at least a little while, but We Need Medicine is no Panacea—and once it has run its course, it seems like it’d be more humane for the members of The Fratellis to just let the band die in peace."

== Chart performance ==
The album peaked at number 26 in their native UK album chart, significantly lower than their previous two albums, which had both peaked in the Top 5. It peaked at number 53 in Japan, and peaked at number 106 in the US. Comparatively, the trio's previous album Here We Stand had peaked at number 80.

== Track listing ==
All tracks are written by Jon Fratelli.

No.	Title	Length
1.	"Halloween Blues"	3:16
2.	"This Old Ghost Town"	3:40
3.	"She's Not Gone Yet But She's Leaving"	3:50
4.	"Seven Nights, Seven Days"	3:25
5.	"Shotgun Shoes"	4:24
6.	"Whisky Saga"	3:10
7.	"This Is Not The End of the World"	4:00
8.	"Jeannie Nitro"	4:19
9.	"We Need Medicine"	4:00
10.	"Rock N Roll Will Break Your Heart"	5:21
11.	"Until She Saves My Soul"	5:33
Total length:		44:58

== Personnel ==
Band

- Jon Fratelli – Guitar, piano and vocals
- Barry Fratelli – Bass guitar
- Mince Fratelli – Drums

Additional musicians

- Will Foster – Piano and Keys on "Whiskey Saga" and "Until She Saves My Soul"
- Ryan Quigley – Trumpet on "This Old Ghost Town", "She's Not Gone Yet But She's Leaving" and "Until She Saves My Soul"
- Paul Towndrow – Saxophone on "She's Not Gone Yet But She's Leaving" and "Until She Saves My Soul"
- Deek McGee – Saxophone on "Halloween Blues"

Production

- Jon Fratelli and Stuart McCredie – Producer
- Stuart McCredie – Mixing engineer

Artwork

- Dan Porter

== The Soul Crush EP ==
The Soul Crush EP

EP by The Fratellis
- Released: 8 September 2014
- Recorded: 2014
- Genre: Indie rock
- Length: 12:25
- Producer: Jon Fratelli

The Fratellis chronology
We Need Medicine (2013)	The Soul Crush EP (2014)	Eyes Wide, Tongue Tied (2015)

After their tour in support of We Need Medicine the band released a free EP via their website called The Soul Crush EP which consisted of three new songs. The EP has never been commercially released and is no longer available to download via the band's website.

All tracks are written by Jon Fratelli.

No.	Title	Length
1.	"They Go Down"	3:50
2.	"Oh Scarlett"	3:21
3.	"Soul Crush"	5:17
