= Mistress Mabel =

Single by the Fratellis

from the album Here We Stand
- Released: 26 May 2008
- Recorded: 2008
- Studio: The Playground (Glasgow)
- Genre: Alternative rock, indie rock
- Length: 4:27 (Album Version); 3:37 (Radio Edit)
- Label: Island
- Songwriter: Jon Fratelli
- Producer: The Fratellis

The Fratellis singles chronology
"Ole Black 'N' Blue Eyes" (2007)	"Mistress Mabel" (2008)	"Look Out Sunshine!" (2008)

"Mistress Mabel" is a song by Scottish rock band the Fratellis and the first single from their second album Here We Stand. The single was released on 26 May 2008. The song was first introduced by the band at their Queen Margaret Union show on 22 February 2008 as the first song on the set list. The first ever radio play was on 3 April 2008 by the radio DJ Jim Gellatly on his X-posure show on XFM Scotland, the same DJ who was the first to give The Fratellis radio play. Zane Lowe played the track to open his show on BBC Radio 1 on 7 April.

The radio edit was released on iTunes (US) on Tuesday 22 May 2008, without any of the B-sides available.

The B-sides include two songs previously released as demos, "Boy Done Good" and "Ella's in the Band", and the previously unheard track "When All the Lights Go Out".

The single received mixed reviews from critics and fans, making a rather disappointing return for the Fratellis as a lead single. It entered the UK Singles Chart at number 27 on downloads alone on the day before its physical release, the band's fifth UK Top 40 single. It peaked at number 23 the following week before slipping down to number 38 during its third week.

== Critical reception ==
Rolling Stone's Christian Hoard praised the song alongside "Shameless" for having "stellar bar-rock hooks and big, memorable choruses" that may "inspire some spirited pubwide singalong." AllMusic's Heather Phares said it "delivers on the pop potential the Fratellis try for elsewhere." Jill Menze of Billboard commended it alongside "My Friend John" and "Shameless" for emitting "high-energy infection". Alex Fletcher of Digital Spy was mixed on the track, criticising the incomprehensible lyrics but praised the "dozen pianos" and "fine[st] rattling riffs" throughout the production. Chris Baynes of PopMatters criticised the song's "generic riffing and clichéd couplets", saying it was "shockingly dull." Tony Robert Whyte of Drowned in Sound called it "overwhelmingly inane" and "the worst kind of revivalist Britpop shite that no band should be allowed to unleash unto the masses." Pitchfork contributor Adam Moerder felt the track dug "a new low for the group," highlighting the "easy-to-swallow blues riffs venturing into Hootie territory and beyond."

== Track listing ==
CD single
No.	Title	Length
1.	"Mistress Mabel"	4:27
2.	"Ella's in the Band"	4:12
3.	"When All the Lights Go Out"	3:54

7" single
No.	Title	Length
1.	"Mistress Mabel"	4:27
2.	"Boy Done Good"	3:44

iTunes download
No.	Title	Length
1.	"Mistress Mabel"	4:27
2.	"Ella's in the Band"	4:12
3.	"When All the Lights Go Out"	3:54
4.	"Boy Done Good"	3:44

This is listed on the iTunes Store as Mistress Mabel - EP.

iTunes download single
No.	Title	Length
1.	"Mistress Mabel" (Radio Edit)	3:41

== Charts ==
Chart (2008)	Peak position
Japan (Japan Hot 100)	72
Scotland Singles (OCC)	3
UK Singles (OCC)	23
