= Look Out Sunshine! =

2008 single by The Fratellis

Single by the Fratellis

from the album Here We Stand
- Released: 18 August 2008
- Recorded: 2008
- Studio: The Playground (Glasgow)
- Genre: Alternative rock
- Length: 3:53
- Label: Island Records
- Songwriter: Jon Fratelli
- Producer: The Fratellis

The Fratellis singles chronology
"Mistress Mabel" (2008)	"Look Out Sunshine!" (2008)	"A Heady Tale" (2008)

"Look Out Sunshine!" is a song by Scottish rock band the Fratellis and the second single from their second album Here We Stand. The song was released on 18 August 2008 and peaked within the UK Singles Chart top 100 at number 70, marking the band's seventh single to appear in the UK top 75, but it fell off the chart the next week. On the Scottish Singles and Albums Chart, "Look Out Sunshine!" became the band's first (and to date only) number-one single and sixth top 10 hit, spending seven weeks in the top 100.

The money raised from the album went to the Teenage Cancer Trust to help build a new unit in Glasgow. The B-Side called "The Good Life" is bassist Barry Fratelli's first published song. The music video was uploaded to YouTube by Island Records on 22 July.

== Critical reception ==
Alex Fletcher of Digital Spy called it "a four-minute arm-swaying belter that The Kooks would have loved for their recent album". AllMusic's Heather Phares put it alongside "Babydoll" as the album's "bright, lively songs" being "not as catchy as they could be." Jon Young of Spin felt the track could "pass for early Bowie in bubblegum mode", but was critical of the "cautiously calculated" performance. Martin Robinson of NME wrote that it was "basically [just] one big chorus, complete with a rabble-rousing key change for wedding discos."

== Track listing ==
CD
No.	Title	Length
1.	"Look Out Sunshine!"	3:53
2.	"B Movie Saga"	4:04
3.	"Z Movie Saga"	4:50

7" Vinyl
No.	Title	Length
1.	"Look Out Sunshine!"	3:53
2.	"The Good Life"	3:06

iTunes Download
No.	Title	Length
1.	"Look Out Sunshine! (Live)"	4:07
2.	"B Movie Saga"	4:04
3.	"Z Movie Saga"	4:50
4.	"The Good Life"	3:06

This is listed on the iTunes Store as Look Out Sunshine! - EP.

iTunes Download
No.	Title	Length
1.	"Look Out Sunshine!"	3:53
2.	"A Heady Tale (Live at T in the Park 2008)"	5:09
3.	"Milk and Money (Live at T in the Park 2008)"	5:31
4.	"Nobodys Favourite Actor"	3:59

This is listed on the iTunes Store as Look Out Sunshine! - EP with faded artwork.

== Charts ==
Chart (2008)	Peak position
Scotland Singles (OCC)	1
Switzerland Airplay (Schweizer Hitparade)	75
UK Singles (OCC)	70

== See also ==
Charity record
