= Edgy in Brixton =

Video by The Fratellis
- Released: 1 October 2007 (UK); 30 October 2007 (US)
- Recorded: 2007; Brixton Academy
- Genre: Post-punk revival Indie rock
- Length: 188 minutes
- Label: Island

The Fratellis chronology
Costello Music (2006)	Edgy in Brixton (2007)	Here We Stand (2008)

Edgy in Brixton is a DVD by The Fratellis consisting largely of a live concert recorded at the Brixton Academy. It was released 1 October 2007. The DVD is available in standard and deluxe formats.

== Track listing ==
No.	Title	Length
1.	"Henrietta"
2.	"Everybody Knows You Cried Last Night"
3.	"The Pimp"
4.	"Flathead"
5.	"Vince the Loveable Stoner"
6.	"Doginabag"
7.	"Creepin Up the Backstairs"
8.	"Pretty Like a Girl"
9.	"Nina"
10.	"Ole Black 'n' Blue Eyes"
11.	"Baby Fratelli"
12.	"Whistle for the Choir"
13.	"Chelsea Dagger"
14.	"Got Ma Nuts from a Hippie"
15.	"For the Girl"
16.	"Cuntry Boys & City Girls"
17.	"Ooh La Hot Love" (A mixed song made up of covers of Goldfrapp's "Ooh La La" and T.Rex's "Hot Love" & "Children of the Revolution")

=== Bonus features ===
No.	Title	Length
1.	"Creepin Up the Backstairs" (video)
2.	"Henrietta" (video)
3.	"Chelsea Dagger" (video)
4.	"Whistle for the Choir" (video)
5.	"Flathead" (US version)
6.	"Baby Fratelli" (video)
7.	"Ole Black 'n' Blue Eyes" (video)
8.	"Weblink to 9 Minute Documentary"
9.	"Ella's in the Band" (Jon on the Bus)
10.	"Henrietta" (live from T in the Park)
11.	"Chelsea Dagger" (live from T in the Park)
12.	"Whistle for the Choir" (live from T in the Park)
13.	"Baby Fratelli" (live From T in the Park)
14.	"Ole Black 'n' Blue Eyes" (live from T in the Park)
15.	"Flathead" (live from T in the Park)
16.	"Interview From Backstage @ T in the Park"
17.	"The Budhill Singles Club – Members Area" (An area of the DVD in which members of the Fratellis Forum would share their favourite memories of the Fratellis, whether seeing them live, meeting them in person or any other Fratelli-related moments. Around 100 member's had their memories selected and were included in it.)

== Personnel ==
- Barry Fratelli – bass
- Mince Fratelli – drums, vocals
- Jon Fratelli – guitar, vocals
