= A Heady Tale =

Single by The Fratellis

from the album Here We Stand
- Released: 22 December 2008
- Recorded: 2008
- Genre: Alternative rock
- Length: 4:53
- Label: Island Records
- Songwriter(s): Jon Fratelli
- Producer(s): The Fratellis

The Fratellis singles chronology
"Look Out Sunshine!" (2008)	"A Heady Tale" (2008)

"A Heady Tale" is the third single by Scottish rock band, The Fratellis from their second album, Here We Stand. It was released on 22 December 2008. This song is 1 of the 4 tracks on Here We Stand to have a heavy use of piano (the other 3 being "Mistress Mabel", "Milk And Money" & "Moriaty's Last Stand"). The B-sides "Mon Yous, Mon us but no' Them" and "When All the Lights Go Out" were also piano intensive. Jon Fratelli has said that the B-Side "Lonesome Anti Christmas Blues" is the "most depressing Christmas song written".

The CD version of the single was released as a limited edition (limited to 1,000 copies) CD with a Christmas card. The limited edition CD can be bought directly from the official online store on The Fratellis Homepage. Because of this, the single underperformed in the UK Singles Chart, failing to even chart in the UK Top 100.

== Track listing ==
CD
No.	Title	Length
1.	"A Heady Tale"
2.	"Lonesome Anti-Christmas Blues"

7" Vinyl
No.	Title	Length
1.	"A Heady Tale"
2.	"Lazybones"

iTunes Download
No.	Title	Length
1.	"A Heady Tale"
2.	"Lonesome Anti-Christmas Blues"
3.	"Lazybones"
