= Romes =

Canadian electronic rock duo

- Origin: Toronto, Ontario, Canada
- Genre: Electronic rock Hip-hop Hard rock Alternative rock
- Years active: 2016–present
- Members: Jacob Bitove; Nicolas Bitove
- Past members: James Tebbitt; Andrew Keyes
- Website: romesmusic.com

Romes (stylized ROMES) is a Canadian electronic rock duo from Toronto, Ontario, made up of brothers Jacob and Nicolas Bitove. As per the band's social media bios, the name can be interpreted as an acronym for Raw Overdriven Mind Expansion Systems.

== History ==
Romes was formed in 2016, composed of Canadian brothers Jacob and Nicolas Bitove, along with Irish friends James Tebbitt and Andrew Keyes. The four original members of Romes all met while attending school in Wicklow, Ireland, before relocating to Jacob and Nicolas's hometown of Toronto. James and Andrew left the group amicably in 2020, as per an official statement on the Romes Facebook page.

The band made their U.S. major festival debut at Austin City Limits Music Festival on October 6, 2017, while on a 34 date U.S. tour supporting Mutemath. The band has also supported artists including The Strokes, Silversun Pickups, The Warning, and Saint Asonia.

In January 2017, Romes were selected by Alternative Press as one of their "Artists to Watch in 2017".

Since the band became a duo in 2020, Romes has released a collection of singles independently, including their self-produced EP My Demons Are My Best Friends, released in 2021, featured by Rolling Stone Mexico. The brothers were also hired in 2024 to score and produce multiple tracks on Call of Duty: Black Ops 6, alongside Jack Wall. NME said "the pair helped fuck up the more polished moments of the score with snarling guitar and thundering drums". The band has also done official collaborations with Moog, Alesis, and Neural DSP highlighting their approach to sound design and production.

== Discography ==
=== Extended plays ===
Title	Album details
My Demons Are My Best Friends	Release: August 6, 2021; Format: Digital download; Producer: Romes; Label: Independent/Sugar Blood Records

=== Albums ===
Title	Album details
SONIC TRASH	Release: November 14, 2025; Format: Digital download, Vinyl; Producer: Romes; Label: Independent

=== Single releases ===
Title	Date
"Chillthefuckout."	May 21, 2021
"Alittle."	June 25, 2021
"Brokenasyou."	September 24, 2021
"FLM"	February 4, 2022
"Misery's on its Way"	April 1, 2022
"Care Less"	June 17, 2022
"We Need Some Help"	November 4, 2022
"Choker"	March 3, 2023
"Nothingness"	October 6, 2023
"Erased"	April 19, 2024
"Everything Is Not Meant to be OK"	April 19, 2024
"The Dream"	June 14, 2024
"Ski Mask"	July 26, 2024
"Everything You Know is Not as it Seems"	June 26, 2024
"Sonic Trash"	August 14, 2025
"Dissolver"	August 28, 2025

=== Music videos ===
Title	Year	Director(s)
"Nothingness"	2023	Cameron Noble
"Choker"	2023	Cameron Noble
"Misery's on Its Way"	2022	Cameron Noble
"FLM"	2022	ROMES
"Brokenasyou."	2021	Cameron Noble
"Chillthefuckout."	2021	Cameron Noble
