= Chelsea Dagger =

2006 single by the Fratellis

Single by the Fratellis

from the album Costello Music
- B-side: "The Pimp"; "Dirty Barry Stole the Bluebird"
- Released: 28 August 2006
- Length: 3:35
- Label: Fallout
- Songwriter: Jon Fratelli
- Producer: Tony Hoffer

The Fratellis singles chronology
"Henrietta" (2006)	"Chelsea Dagger" (2006)	"Whistle for the Choir" (2006)

"Chelsea Dagger" is a song by Scottish rock band the Fratellis. It was released as the second single from their debut studio album, Costello Music (2006), on 28 August 2006. It is named after Jon Fratelli's wife Heather, a burlesque dancer whose stage name is a play on Britney Spears. Fratelli described the tune as "a rock 'n' roll gig in an old speakeasy or something like that."

This song was number 77 on Rolling Stone's list of the 100 Best Songs of 2007. "Chelsea Dagger" has become notable for its usage in sports. It has also been featured in adverts for Amstel Light and KitKat, the films Run Fatboy Run and Pitch Perfect, a trailer to Shrek the Third, a TV spot for Open Season, an episode of The Inbetweeners, as well as the video games Burnout Dominator and Guitar Hero: On Tour Modern Hits. The song peaked at number two on the Scottish Singles Chart and number five on the UK Singles Chart and was certified triple platinum by the British Phonographic Industry (BPI) in 2024.

== Usage in sports ==
"Chelsea Dagger" is used heavily as a sports anthem. The first team to adopt it was Celtic, of whom the Fratellis are supporters. It has also been adopted at Stamford Bridge, home of Chelsea; Jon Fratelli commented that their use of the song had resulted in the band supporting the club. It is also used by other football teams such as Perth Glory, Major League Soccer franchise CF Montreal, Norwegian club Bodø/Glimt and Belgian club Cercle Brugge when a goal is scored, while Italian club Juventus used it for more than 8 years and 500 goals, until 15 December 2019. Currently Sporting Clube de Portugal and New Zealand club Wellington Phoenix also play the song after every victory by their team. The song is also used as the goal celebration song of the Nottingham Panthers in the Elite Ice Hockey League, and by Melbourne Ice (one of two Melbourne teams playing Hockey in the AIHL – the Australian Ice Hockey League) Safeway also used it for a commercial in 2006

Outside of football, it is best known as the goal song of the National Hockey League's Chicago Blackhawks, first used late in the 2007–08 NHL season. The song gained popularity within the team and its fans during the Blackhawks' first Stanley Cup run in 49 years in 2010, and as of the 2025–26 NHL season, it remains the team's current goal song. The song was then adopted by the entire Blackhawks' minor league system, the Rockford IceHogs (AHL) and Indy Fuel (ECHL) clubs. During the Blackhawks' successful run to the 2013 Stanley Cup, Chicago Symphony Orchestra conductor Riccardo Muti arranged an orchestral version of the song that was performed after the victory, and again after the Blackhawks' 2015 Stanley Cup win. The song was also ranked "best goal song in NHL" by Sports Illustrated in 2014.

Opposing NHL teams have also used the song as a taunt against the Chicago Blackhawks. The Vancouver Canucks, who had lost to the Blackhawks in previous years in the playoffs, used the song after Alexandre Burrows scored in overtime in Game 7 of their 2011 series with Chicago. Five years later, St. Louis Blues organist Jeremy Boyer played the song in a somber tone after the Blues eliminated the Blackhawks in Game 7 of their 2016 series.

The success of the Blackhawks has led "Chelsea Dagger" to be adopted as a goal song by the University of North Dakota (which is also the alma mater of Jonathan Toews, who captained all three Blackhawks Stanley Cup winning teams in the 2010s), as well as the Pensacola Ice Flyers and the Roanoke Rail Yard Dawgs of the SPHL among others. This song is played during the Hong Kong Sevens. The song is also played after every try scored at European Championship home games of the Leinster Rugby club in the RDS Dublin Ireland. It was also a favorite of the now defunct LSUA Rugby Club which made a Championship run in each of its seasons in NSCRO.

It is also used by the Georgia Swarm of the National Lacrosse League after the team scores a goal at all home games. While the song is played, fans hold their arms out in the air and move them up and down. This also occurs at the home games of the Brisbane Broncos rugby league team.

The song has been regularly played during ITV4's coverage of the PDC darts events. Sky Sports had popularised the use of "Chase the Sun" by Planet Funk as 'the darts song', but when ITV4 picked up the rights to certain tournaments, they opted instead to use "Chelsea Dagger" for their intros and outros.

== Track listings ==
CD single, 12-inch "Lady-Shaped" vinyl
No.	Title	Length
1.	"Chelsea Dagger"
2.	"Dirty Barry Stole the Bluebird"

8-inch coloured vinyl
No.	Title	Length
1.	"Chelsea Dagger"
2.	"The Pimp"

== Charts ==
=== Weekly charts ===
Chart (2006–2007)	Peak position
Belgium (Ultratip Bubbling Under Flanders)	13
Czech Republic Airplay (ČNS IFPI)	90
Ireland (IRMA)	33
Netherlands (Dutch Top 40)	4
Netherlands (Single Top 100)	4
New Zealand (Recorded Music NZ)	38
Scottish Singles Sales (Official Charts)	2
UK Singles (Official Charts)	5

=== Year-end charts ===
Chart (2006)	Position
UK Singles (OCC)	79

Chart (2007)	Position
Netherlands (Dutch Top 40)	52
Netherlands (Single Top 100)	40
UK Singles (OCC)	124

== Certifications ==
Region	Certification	Certified units/sales
Italy (FIMI)	Gold	50,000^{‡}
New Zealand (RMNZ)	Platinum	30,000^{‡}
United Kingdom (BPI)	3× Platinum	1,800,000^{‡}
^{‡} Sales+streaming figures based on certification alone.
