= Whistle for the Choir =

2006 single by the Fratellis

Single by the Fratellis

from the album Costello Music
- Released: 27 November 2006
- Length: 3:35
- Label: Drop the Gun
- Songwriter: Jon Fratelli
- Producer: Tony Hoffer

The Fratellis singles chronology
"Chelsea Dagger" (2006)	"Whistle for the Choir" (2006)	"Flathead" (2007)

"Whistle for the Choir" is a song by Scottish rock band the Fratellis. It was released on 27 November 2006 as the band's third single and reached number nine on the UK Singles Chart, marking their second UK top-10 single. In the band's native Scotland, the song reached number two, becoming their second song to reach that position after "Chelsea Dagger".

The working title for the song was "Knickers in a Handbag", named after a line from Scottish comedian Billy Connolly. The artwork points toward the old name by showing a girl on the cover handling a pair of knickers above a handbag. The "wistful" song is the most light-hearted and sentimental of the entire album and has drawn comparison to "What Katie Did" by the Libertines

== Music video ==
The video shows the band singing on darkened streets. It was filmed in Glasgow city centre, including Buchanan Street and Sauchiehall Street.

== Track listings ==
CD Single, Limited Edition Shaped Vinyl Picture Disc
No.	Title	Length
1.	"Whistle for the Choir"
2.	"Nina"

8-inch Blue Coloured Vinyl
No.	Title	Length
1.	"Whistle for the Choir"
2.	"Lay Down Easy"

iTunes Download
No.	Title	Length
1.	"Whistle for the Choir"
2.	"Baby Fratelli"
3.	"Flathead"

This is listed in the iTunes Store as the Whistle for the Choir - EP even though it contains two other singles from the Fratellis' debut album, Costello Music.

== Charts ==
=== Weekly charts ===
Chart (2006–2007)	Peak position
Romania (Romanian Top 100)	96
Scottish Singles Sales (Official Charts)	2
UK Singles (Official Charts)	9

=== Year-end charts ===
Chart (2007)	Position
UK Singles (OCC)	184

== Certifications ==
Certifications and sales for "Whistle for the Choir"
Region	Certification	Certified units/sales
United Kingdom (BPI)	Gold	400,000^{‡}
^{‡} Sales+streaming figures based on certification alone.

== In popular culture ==
- "Whistle for the Choir" is featured on the soundtrack of a 2007 episode of the American drama series Brothers & Sisters and in the 2009 Community episode "The Politics of Human Sexuality".
- The song was featured on the controversial Channel 4 drama Britz.
- James Gunn used the song in his film The Suicide Squad (2021). Barry Fratelli was very pleased with this, saying he was a huge fan of Gunn's films.
