= The Fratellis =

Scottish indie rock band

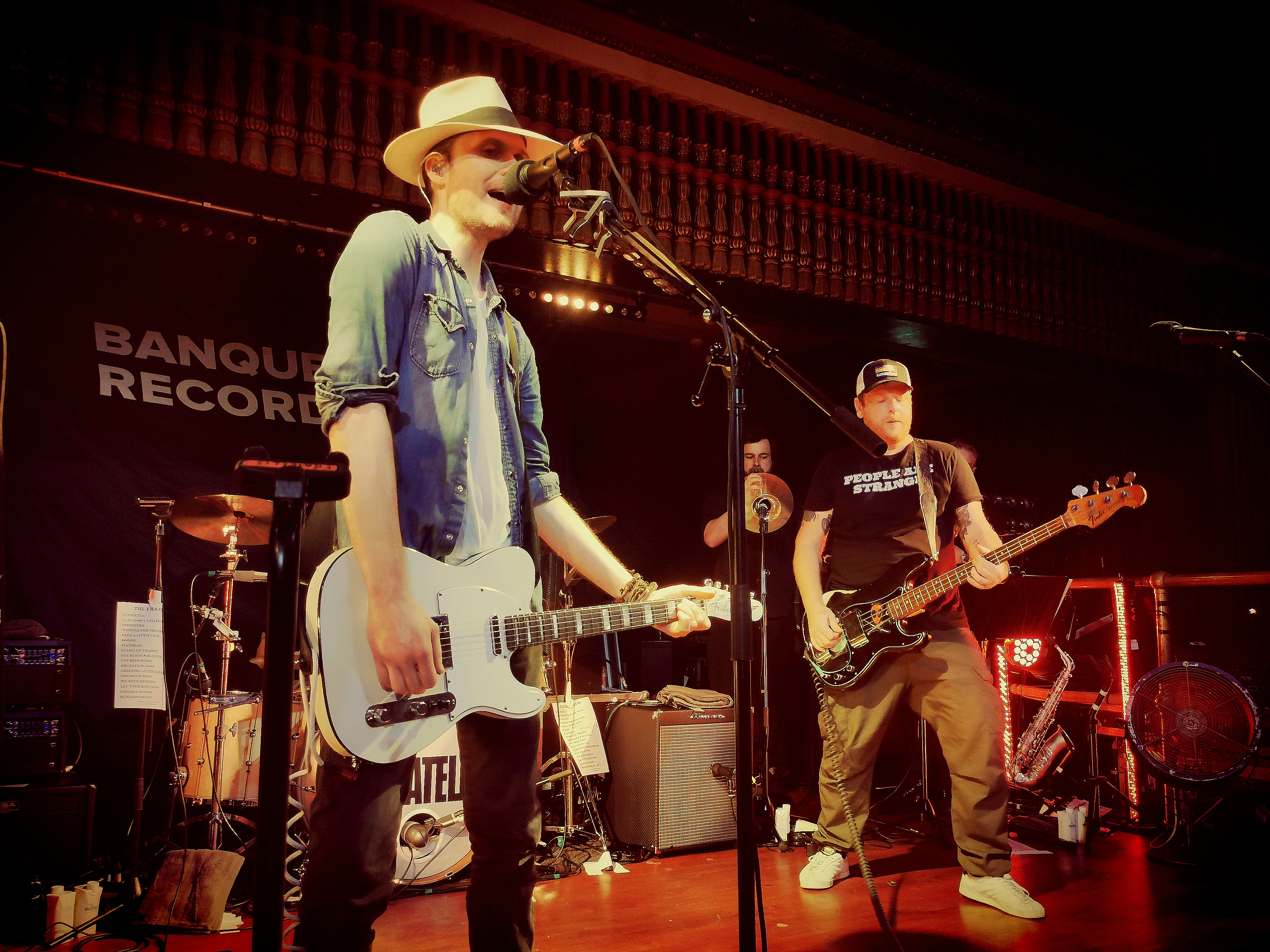
- The Fratellis performing at Pryzm, Kingston upon Thames in 2021

Background information
- Origin: Glasgow, Scotland
- Genres: Indie rock; alternative rock
- Years active: 2005–2009; 2012–present
- Labels: Cooking Vinyl; Island; BMG
- Members: Jon Fratelli; Baz Fratelli; Mince Fratelli
- Website: thefratellis.co.uk

The Fratellis (/frəˈtɛliːz/ frə-TEL-eez) are a Scottish rock band from Glasgow, formed in 2005. The band consists of three unrelated members, who perform under pseudonyms: lead vocalist and guitarist Jon Fratelli, bassist Baz Fratelli, and drummer Mince Fratelli. Their debut album, Costello Music (2006) peaked at number two on the UK Albums Chart and spent eighty-three weeks in the UK Top 100. In the United States, it peaked at forty-eight on the US Billboard 200.

The Fratellis won the 2007 BRIT Award for Best British Breakthrough Act, and as of March 2018, Costello Music had sold 1,145,000 copies in the UK. Costello Music spawned five singles – "Henrietta", "Chelsea Dagger", "Whistle for the Choir", "Baby Fratelli" and "Ole Black 'n' Blue Eyes". The singles "Chelsea Dagger" and "Whistle for the Choir" were both top ten hits in the UK charts. Following the success of Costello Music, the Fratellis released their second album, Here We Stand (2008), before entering a hiatus period.

The band returned in 2013 and released their third album We Need Medicine, debuting at number twenty-six on the UK Albums Chart. The album’s performance was considered a disappointment and marked significant decline in popularity for the band. We Need Medicine dropped out of the UK Top 100 after just one week. The album peaked at number 106 on the US Billboard 200.

Chart performances improved for the band with the release of their further releases, Eyes Wide, Tongue Tied (2015), In Your Own Sweet Time (2018) and Half Drunk Under a Full Moon (2021), all of which debuted within the top five in their native Scotland.

== History ==
=== 2005–2006: The Fratellis EP and Costello Music ===
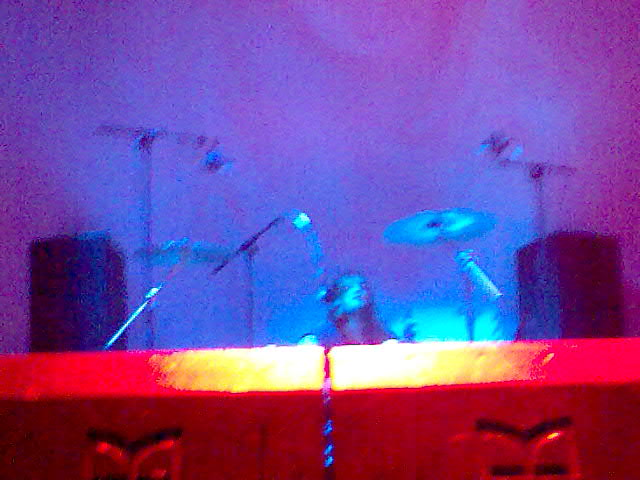
Drummer, Gordon McRory, in 2006

The band's name came from the criminal family in The Goonies. They played their first show on 4 March 2005 in Glasgow, and received their first radio play in 2005. They were signed by Fallout Records after less than 10 shows. The band formed after the band members placed adverts in record stores around Glasgow, originally forming as a four-piece with Mince on lead guitar and a drummer called Chris who was soon fired. The Fratellis EP was released on 3 April 2006, featuring the tracks "Stacie Anne" and "The Gutterati?". The band's first single, "Henrietta", was released on 12 June 2006 and reached number 19 on the UK Charts.

The band's debut album, Costello Music, was released on 11 September 2006. It charted at number two in the UK album charts for three weeks. The success of the album led to the Fratellis winning the Brit Award for British Breakthrough Act in 2007, an award that was voted for by BBC Radio One listeners.

The Fratellis supported Kasabian in December 2006 on their UK tour before playing 10 dates by themselves in February and March 2007. Following the release of Costello Music, the band embarked on a tour of the UK festival circuit, playing at Glastonbury and headlining at festivals such as NME's Rock 'n' Riot tour, OXEGEN 2007 and T in the Park 2007, amongst others. They also opened for The Police Reunion Tour in the summer of 2007 in some of the North America dates. The Fratellis also recorded some cover songs during the year including "All Along the Watchtower" for Radio 1's 40th Anniversary Double Album, Radio 1: Established 1967, and "Solid Gold Easy Action" for the soundtrack of the film Hot Fuzz, which also included the single "Baby Fratelli".

=== 2007–2009: Here We Stand and hiatus ===
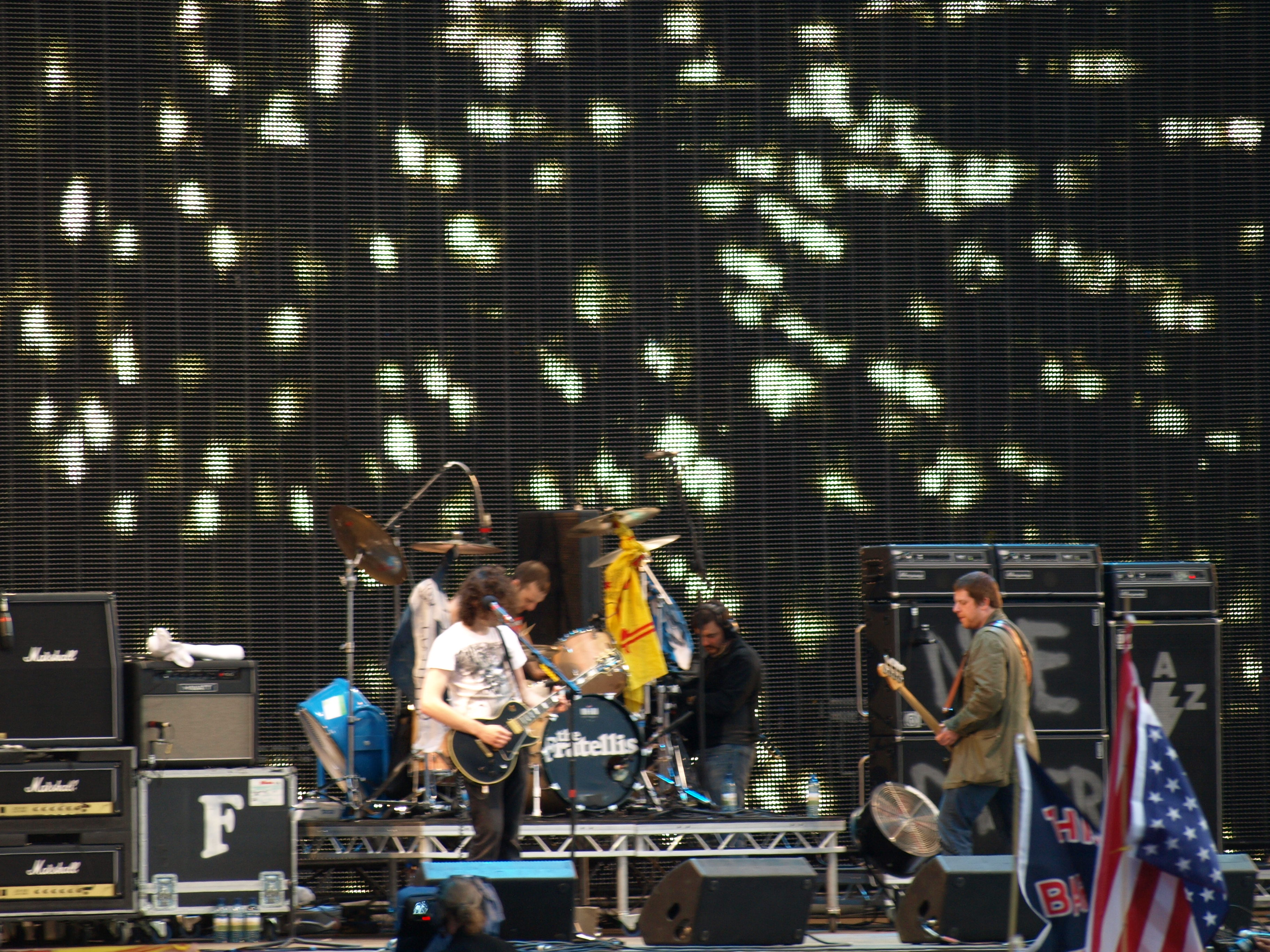
The Fratellis performing at T in the Park, 2008

The band released their first live DVD, Edgy In Brixton, in the UK on 1 October 2007, which was recorded at the Brixton Academy in London. Following the release of the album, the Fratellis embarked on a full live performance of the debut album Costello Music, B-sides from various singles and a new song called "Pretty Like a Girl". Extras on the DVD include the band being asked questions by members of the Fratellis' website, and on the deluxe edition, highlights from the T in the Park 2007 festival. It was released in the United States on 30 October 2007.

Also in October 2007, the band contributed a cover of "All Along the Watchtower" (originally by Bob Dylan and popularized by The Jimi Hendrix Experience) for the covers compilation album Radio 1: Established 1967, in celebration of the fourtieth anniversary of BBC Radio 1 signing on air.

The band's second album, Here We Stand, was first mentioned in November 2007 on their website, which stated that work had begun on the album in a rehearsal space in Glasgow. The band said that they were self-producing the album and had their own studio to record in. Recording finished on 13 January 2008.

The band filmed on 18 June 2008 at the Fillmore, San Francisco; performances of "Milk and Money", "Flathead" and "Mistress Mabel" from Abbey Road Studios and the videos for second album, Here We Stand, was first mentioned in November 2007 on the Fratellis' official website, which stated that work had begun on the album in a rehearsal space in Glasgow. The band said that they were self-producing the album and had their own studio to record in. Recording finished on 13 January 2008.

On 22 February 2008, they played a highlights from the T in the Park 2007 festival small show for fans at Queen Margaret Union to debut new songs from the upcoming album. About eight new going towards the Teenage Cancer Trust. The third single was "A Heady Tale", released on 22 December. The Fratellis released a deluxe edition of Here We Stand internationally songs from their new album were played, including "Mistress Mabel", "Acid Jazz Singer", and "Look Out Sunshine!". This performance introduced two new touring members, a guitarist, Robin Peringer and a keyboard player, Will Foster (ex. Delicatessen, Lodger, and The Tears). However, after the Teenage Cancer Trust show in 2008, Robin departed the tour for unknown reasons. Will Foster subsequently played both keyboard and guitar during live performances. The album was released on 9 June 2008 in the UK and 10 June 2008 in the United States. The band marked the US release of the album with sold-out shows in New York City, Boston, and Los Angeles. The first single from the album,"Mistress Mabel", was released on 26 May 2008. The next single, "Look Out Sunshine!", released on 18 August 2008 and with money on 8 December. The CD included a new song titled "Moriarty's Last Stand" and the accompanying DVD which features "The Year of the Thief" (a documentary of the band on the road in the US), a live show, and the singles "Mistress Mabel" and "Look Out Sunshine!".

During 2009, the band did a mini-tour of Australia and Japan during February and March. The Fratellis headlined the Island Records 50th anniversary show on 27 May 2009 where they debuted their new track to be included on the Island 50: 50 Years of Island Records which was Bob Marley's "Stir It Up". The band also headlined the Hop Farm Festival 2009 on 4 July, with a gig at the Middlesbrough Empire on 3 July to prepare for the upcoming headline slot. After the Hop Farm show in 2009, the band took an extended break citing exhaustion and relationships within the band turning sour after a series of prolonged touring and working together.

=== 2012–2016: We Need Medicine and Eyes Wide, Tongue Tied ===
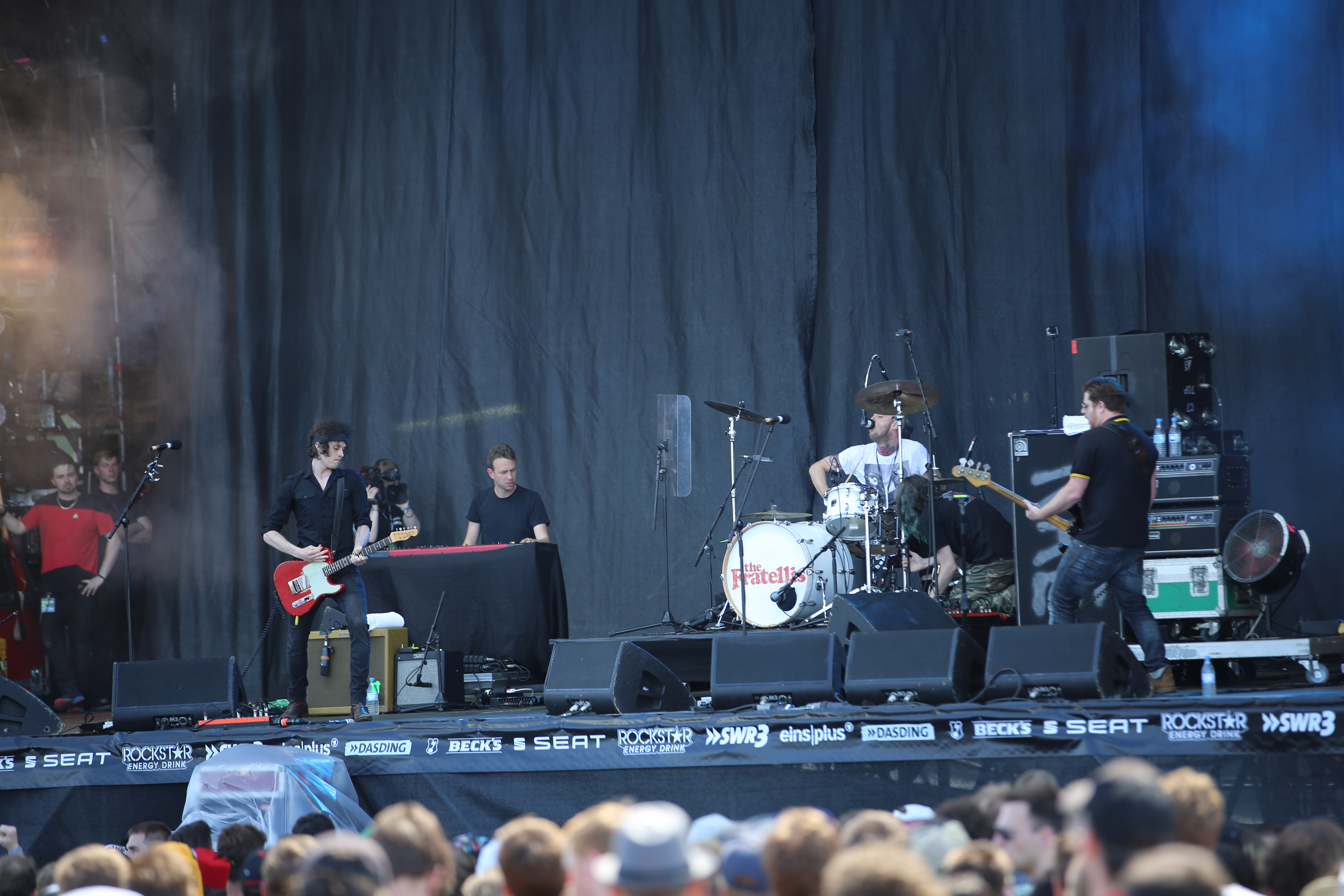
The Fratellis performing at Rock am Ring, 2014

The Fratellis played their first show since 2009 to raise money for the Eilidh Brown Memorial Fund on 15 June 2012, marking nearly 3 years since they last shared a stage together. They then performed at O2 ABC Glasgow on 26 September 2012 and announced a UK tour in April 2013. During the UK tour, 3 more songs were debuted live; "She's Not Gone Yet But She's Leaving", "Seven Nights Seven Days" and "Whiskey Saga". The band went on to perform dates in Oxford, Leicester and Sheffield with another date at Loopallu festival, forming a small September tour. During the tour, the band debuted 2 new tracks, "This Old Ghost Town" (previously played by and mainland Europe.

On 4 February 2013, the Fratellis finished recording their third album, which was to be called We Need Medicine with a release date of 7 October 2013. "Seven Nights Seven Days" was released as a single on 29 September. The album was recorded in Glasgow with Jon Fratelli and Stuart McCredie on production duties. The band saw out 2013 with a tour of the US, UK Need Medicine album campaign with two shows in Russia in September 2014. In 2014, the band played festivals across the world, returning to the US, UK and Europe and also headed over to Japan before finishing the We Need Medicine tour.

During Christmas break 2013, the band started writing new material, and two of the songs debuted live in 2014. "Too Much Wine" was played on the early 2014 US tour, with "All the Live Long Day" (later to be known as "Impostors (Little By Little)") turning up later on. The band released a brand new EP in September 2014 called The Soul Crush EP, which was released for free on their website. Upon releasing The Soul Crush EP in 2014, the band stated they would be heading to LA to record their fourth album, with Barry confirming on Twitter it was once again with Tony Hoffer (Beck, Air), producer-architect of both their debut album and of Jon's solo album Psycho Jukebox.

The album Eyes Wide, Tongue Tied was released through Cooking Vinyl on 21 August 2015. The band announced the first song from the album "Me and the Devil" through their website, and later announced the first single "Baby Don't You Lie To Me" on 29 June. Both tracks were made available as downloads with pre-orders of the album. The band shared a new video for "Baby Don't You Lie To Me!" on 24 July 2015.

In late 2016, the Fratellis launched a UK-wide tour to mark the 10-year anniversary of Costello Music, playing 16 shows through November and December.

=== 2017–2020: In Your Own Sweet Time ===
In 2017, the band announced on Instagram that they were in Los Angeles to record their fifth album with Tony Hoffer once again producing.

In July 2017 the band headlined the Vicar's Picnic music festival, as well as the Lindisfarne Festival, which ran 31 August to 3 September.

On 29 September 2017, the band announced their fifth studio album, In Your Own Sweet Time which was released on 16 March 2018 and followed by with a UK concert tour in March 2018. The album was released on CD, LP, limited edition orange LP and cassette. They also toured the U.S. in late Spring 2018 and early Summer.

After speaking with fans after his solo shows in February 2019, Jon stated that the band were heading to LA in April/May to record their sixth album, once again with Tony Hoffer. On 9 May, the band posted a photo on their social media accounts with the caption "#6". Jon had stated that the band intended to take most of 2019 off after having an extremely busy 2018, with only a few shows played along with two of his own shows for his solo album Bright Night Flowers, which he released in February 2019.

=== 2020–present: Half Drunk Under a Full Moon ===
In January 2020, the band announced that their sixth studio album would be titled Half Drunk Under a Full Moon, and would be released on 8 May 2020, alongside a full UK and US tour in April and June respectively. However, due to the 2020 COVID-19 pandemic, the band announced on 8 April that their UK tour would be postponed to October, and on 23 April that the album release would be delayed until 30 October. On 18 May, they announced that their North American tour would be postponed until January 2021. The first song to be released from the album was "Six Days In June".

== Side projects ==
During the band downtime, Jon formed a new band with singer/songwriter Lou Hickey called Codeine Velvet Club. He released a self-titled album with the band in December 2009 and toured during late 2009 and early 2010. He then released his debut solo album, Psycho Jukebox in 2010 and intended to release a second, titled Bright Night Flowers in 2012 but this was shelved due to the Fratellis reuniting.

Baz initially stated that he was starting his own musical project and would let Fratellis fans know about it via the Fratellis website. In November 2011, he announced that he had joined Birmingham band the Twang, who he played with until August 2012 when he rejoined the Fratellis.

Mince initially joined a heavy metal band called Throne o' Diablo, before leaving the band for unknown reasons. He joined Jon's solo band as a second drummer, backing vocalist and occasional guitarist during live shows for his Psycho Jukebox tour.

After the recording of In Your Own Sweet Time, Jon re-recorded his shelved 2012 solo album Bright Night Flowers and after the main bulk of touring was finished for In Your Own Sweet Time, he announced that the album would be released in February 2019, supported with two shows in London and Glasgow. His first solo shows in six years featured nearly the entirety of Bright Night Flowers with only one song from his previous solo album showing up along with Fratellis' favourites "Whistle for the Choir" and "Laughing Gas" in rearranged forms and a series of covers.

== Band members ==
=== The Fratellis ===
- Jon Fratelli (John Lawler) – lead vocals, guitar, piano, and keyboards
- Baz Fratelli (Barry Wallace) – bass guitar and backing vocals
- Mince Fratelli (Gordon McRory) – drums, backing vocals, and banjo

=== Touring members ===
- Will Foster – keyboards and piano (2008–present), guitar (2008–2009)
- Ryan Quigley – trumpet (2021–present)
- Paul Towndrow – saxophone (2021–present)
- The Wild Tonics – backing vocals (2021–present)

== Discography ==
=== Studio albums ===
- Costello Music (2006)
- Here We Stand (2008)
- We Need Medicine (2013)
- Eyes Wide, Tongue Tied (2015)
- In Your Own Sweet Time (2018)
- Half Drunk Under a Full Moon (2021)

== Awards ==
Date	Award	Awarding body
4 July 2008	Best British Band	33rd Silver Clef Awards 2008
27 January 2008	Best European Border Breaking Act- United Kingdom	2008 European Border Breakers Awards (EBBA)
14 February 2007	Best British Breakthrough Act	BRIT Awards 2007
