= Jon Fratelli =

Scottish musician & songwriter (born 1979)

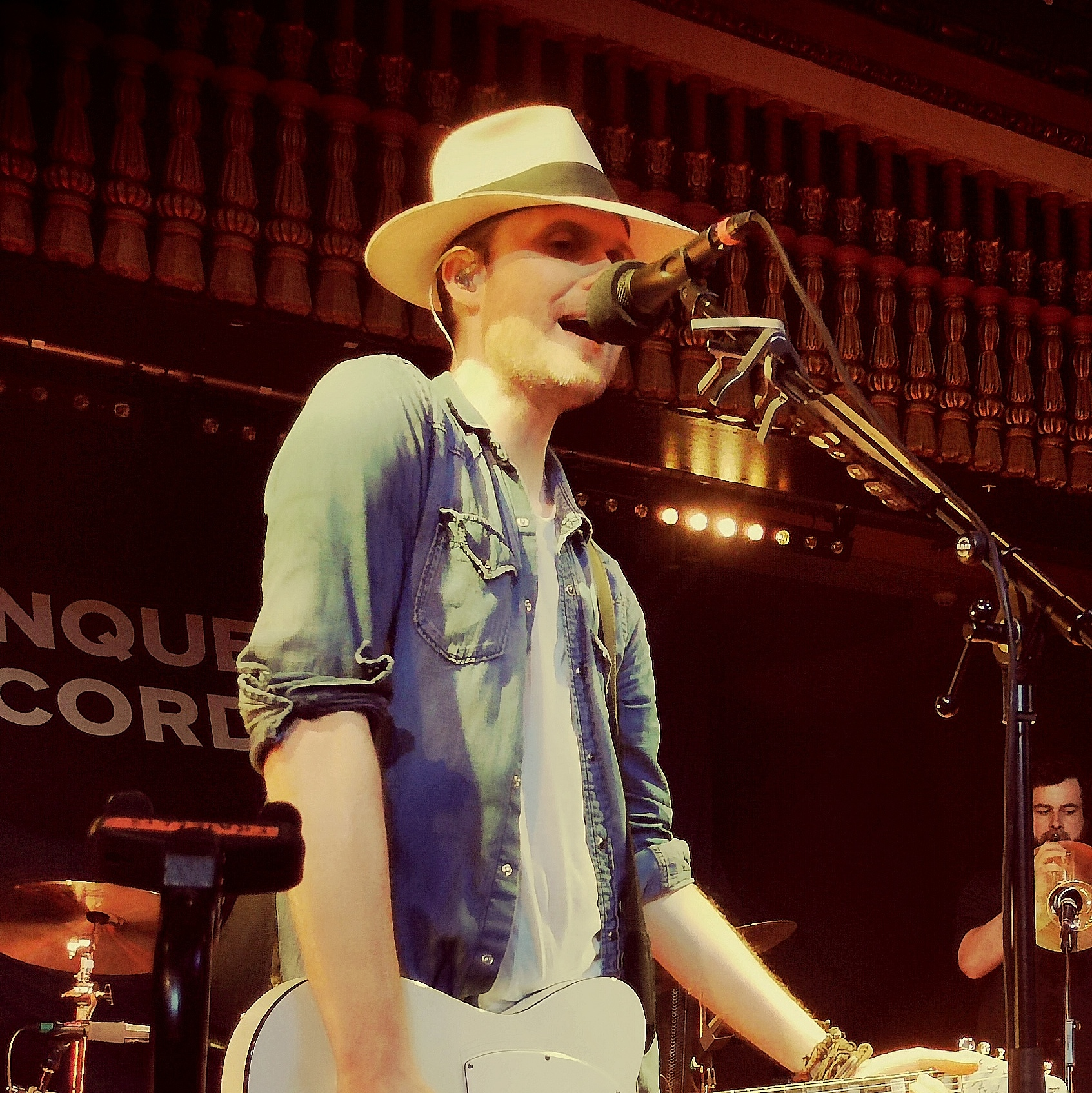
- Jon Fratelli performing in 2021

Background information
- Born: John Paul Lawler; 4 March 1979 (age 47); Glasgow, Scotland
- Origin: Cumbernauld, Lanarkshire, Scotland
- Genres: Alternative rock; garage rock; garage punk; post-punk revival; chamber pop; baroque pop
- Instruments: Guitar; vocals
- Years active: 2005–present
- Member of: The Fratellis
- Formerly of: Codeine Velvet Club
- Spouse: Heather Donnelly (m. 2006)
- Website: jonfratelli.co.uk

John Paul Lawler (born 4 March 1979), known professionally as Jon Fratelli, is a Scottish musician and singer-songwriter, who is the lead singer of the band The Fratellis. Their debut album, Costello Music (2006) was a success, peaking at number 2 on the UK Albums Chart and spending eighty-three weeks in the UK Top 100. In the United States, it peaked at forty-eight on the US Billboard 200. The Fratellis won the 2007 BRIT Award for Best British Breakthrough Act, and as of March 2018, Costello Music had sold 1,145,000 copies in the UK. Costello Music spawned five successful singles – "Henrietta", "Chelsea Dagger", "Whistle for the Choir", "Baby Fratelli" and "Ole Black 'n' Blue Eyes".

Following the success of Costello Music, the Fratellis released their second album, Here We Stand (2008), before entering a hiatus period. During the hiatus period, Lawler formed Codeine Velvet Club with Lou Hickey. Their self titled debut album was released on 28 December 2009 in the UK and on 6 April 2010 in the US. Lawler returned to perform with The Fratellis, and released their third album We Need Medicine in 2013. Debuting at number twenty-six on the UK Albums Chart, it was considered a disappointment and marked significant decline in popularity for the band. We Need Medicine dropped out of the UK Top 100 after just one week. The album peaked at number one hundred and six on the US Billboard 200. Chart performances improved for the band with the release of their further releases, Eyes Wide, Tongue Tied (2015), In Your Own Sweet Time (2018) and Half Drunk Under a Full Moon (2021), all of which debuted within the top five in their native Scotland.

In addition to his work with both bands, Lawler has also released as a solo artist, releasing his debut album Psycho Jukebox in 2011, followed by his second solo studio album Bright Night Flowers in 2019.

== Early years ==
Lawler hails from Cumbernauld, where his mother was a primary school teacher at St. Helen's. He would later move to Glasgow sometime before forming the Fratellis. He attended St. Maurice's High School and went to college before dropping out within three hours. Before joining the Fratellis, he played in various bands including an Oasis and Blur covers band.

== Career ==
=== The Fratellis (2005–2009; 2012–present) ===
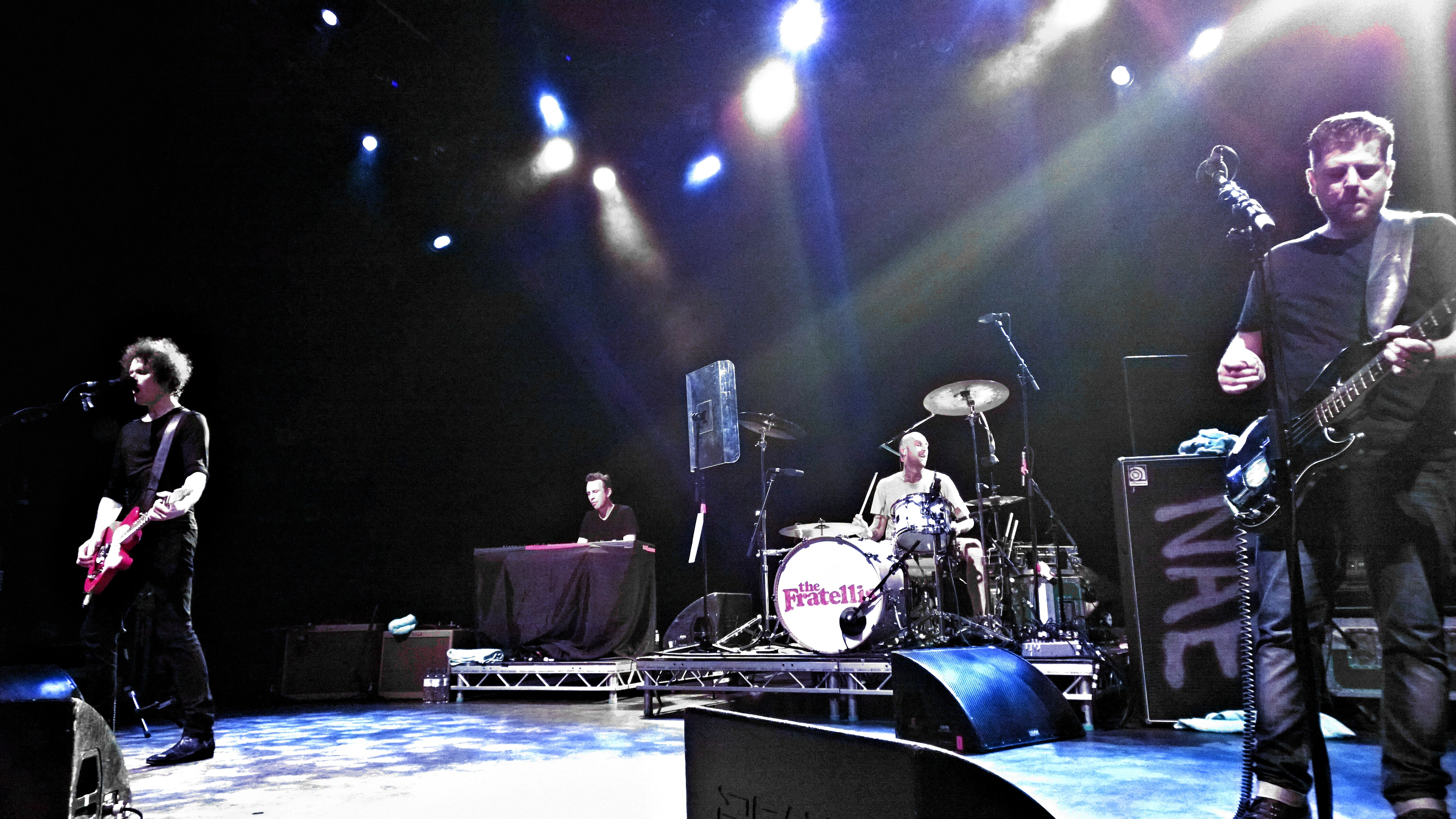
The Fratellis performing at Shepherds Bush Empire, London, November 2013

In 2005, Lawler responded to an advert placed in a music shop by drummer Gordon McRory, which stated "Opportunity of a lifetime ... seeks band to make our mark on the music industry". On this advert he put his name as "Graeme" to avoid detection of his then current bandmates finding out he was seeking a new band. After calling the number, asking for "Graeme" he got told repeatedly that he had the wrong number, he nearly gave up but tried one more time and got a hold of McRory and the band started to form, with Barry Wallace joining the band on bass.

Lawler's role in the band is songwriter, lead vocalist and lead guitarist. He was initially accompanied on guitar by Mince Fratelli (Gordon McRory), but Mince switched to drums after the initial drummer did not work out. Writing credits for Costello Music are for The Fratellis, however, for Here We Stand and We Need Medicine, they are solely credited to him.

After playing the Coachella Festival in California in 2007, during promotion of Fratellis' debut album Costello Music, Lawler decided to flee from the US tour and return to Glasgow, stating that he was too tired to continue the rest of the tour. He later saw this as a mistake, but it allowed him to be even more grateful for the success of the band. The band spent much of 2008 touring and after playing a few dates in 2009, the band parted ways for the foreseeable future. During this time, Jon started and finished Codeine Velvet Club, and additionally started a stint as a solo artist.

On 4 June 2012, The Fratellis announced they had reformed to raise money for The Eilidh Brown Memorial Fund on 15 June 2012, marking nearly 3 years since they last shared a stage together. After a couple of initial gigs, to see how playing together again felt and to test audience interest, the band have continued to play together, recording albums and touring since. They've released We Need Medicine (2013), Eyes Wide, Tongue Tied (2015), In Your Own Sweet Time (2018), and Half Drunk Under a Full Moon (2021).

=== Codeine Velvet Club (2009–2010) ===
Lawler performing as a member of Codeine Velvet Club, 2010

During the promotion of Here We Stand, Lawler stated that he wished to create a solo album to keep himself busy once the band were done touring the album, with the band scheduled to take a break. It later emerged that he planned on teaming up with singer-songwriter Lou Hickey, whom he met through her friendship with Lawler's wife, and creating an album. NME reported in an article that the band was set to be called Codeine Breakfast Club; however, on 23 August 2009, it was confirmed that the band had changed its name to Codeine Velvet Club.

While playing in this band Lawler reverted to using his proper surname. The band's debut album was to be released on 16 November 2009 (however, this was later pushed back to 28 December 2009). Lawler shares songwriting duties with Hickey for about half the tracks on the album, penning the other half by himself (one track, "Nevada" was co-written by Lawler and Will Foster). The duo took a live band (consisting of Ross MacFarlane on drums, Will Foster on keys and guitar, Lewis Gordon on bass and various horn players known as 'The Velvet Horns') for a tour of the UK in 2009 and the US in 2010, playing UK dates in 2010 also. However, Lawler decided that he could not commit to the band anymore and called an end to the band, finishing off what live dates they had and announcing his solo career, with Hickey returning to her solo career also.

=== Solo career (2011–present) ===
Lawler started hinting at a solo career when he set up a new Myspace page, with the track "Bonnie & Clyde" streaming on it. It was also noted that he began using the name Jon Fratelli again. While discussing the end of Codeine Velvet Club, Lawler confirmed his intentions of going solo, taking the backing musicians with him due to them playing well together. Since announcing he is going solo, Lawler has given away some tracks in demo form, including "Dead Street Affair", "She's My Shaker" and "Sometimes You Just Can't Win". For live shows in 2011, Lawler announced that Mince Fratelli would be joining him on the tour, sharing drumming duties with Allan James.

Lawler played some solo shows before heading to Los Angeles in late 2010 to record his debut solo album, Psycho Jukebox with Tony Hoffer, who produced the first Fratellis' album. The title is a reference to the Fratellis' song "Nina", which is featured on the "Whistle for the Choir" single. During February 2011, Lawler released a free track via his website called "Rhythm Doesn't Make You a Dancer" which was to be on the album, and also gave away a free EP called The Magic Hour EP. Lawler stated that these songs couldn't fit on the album but he "still had a lot of time for them". The first single from the album was "Santo Domingo" which was released on 28 February 2011. The second single, "Baby We're Refugees!", was released on 12 June 2011. After embarking on a Scottish tour in March/April 2011, Lawler added two new tracks to Psycho Jukebox, which pushed back the release date to late July 2011. He stated during a podcast that he was told that he can no longer add any more tracks to the album, owing to the label's schedule, but added that the tracks he had added and delayed the album for were worth adding to the album.

Pictures were posted onto Lawler's Facebook page, showing him in the studio with his band. Lawler used his Twitter account to inform people that he was in the studio, but didn't say what these sessions were for. It eventually emerged on 13 January 2012 that it was for a second solo album, as posted on Lawler's website. The post also gave a small 3 track peek at the album, the last song in the preview being "Dead Radio", a song that Lawler tried to add to Psycho Jukebox but the label had already locked down the release dates and track listing. On 24 February 2012, Lawler announced on his website and Facebook that he had almost completed the album and that it was going to be titled Bright Night Flowers. He asked that his fans record sounds of their city during the morning and night so that they could be used on the album, and whoever helped would be mentioned on the album sleeve. It was later announced that he had completed the album, but it would be put to one side for the time being as he was recording a new album and focusing on with the Fratellis. In the intervening years, when asked about it while promoting records by the Fratellis, Jon normally had this to say about it: "I actually made another record that will probably never see the light of day. I’m really happy with it, but as soon as I finished it I stuck it in a drawer and said: 'Right, no one else is ever going to hear that'. It's quite perverse to not release it, but I like that. I was only making it for me. It just needed to be done. I listen to it every so often and really enjoy it – I don't want to spoil that."

In a March 2018 interview with Wired Noise, Jon revealed that he had re-recorded Bright Night Flowers and had possibly changed his stance on releasing it. "Yeah, I did that over the summer. [It] still needs to be mixed, and then I guess at some point, if somebody wants to release it, it’ll find its way out there." During October 2018, fans had noticed that his own website had been changed to a "Coming Soon" holding page. The Fratellis tweeted out on 23 October 2018 with a reactivated account for Jon Fratelli, with a date of 30 October, hinting to an announcement of Bright Night Flowers is coming soon. On 30 October it was announced that Bright Night Flowers would release on 15 February 2019. Jon also released the album's title track & accompanying video.

== Equipment ==
For The Fratellis' debut album, Costello Music, Lawler mainly used a Fender Telecaster, with the exception of a few songs in which he used a Gibson Les Paul and a Gibson ES-335. With their second album Here We Stand, he used a Fender Telecaster, Fender Stratocaster, Gibson Firebird, Rickenbacker 12 string, Gibson Les Paul, and an ES-335 for his electrics. For the acoustic performances, he used a Gibson SJ-200, a Gibson Hummingbird, and a Gibson J-45. During promotional performances of the album, Lawler was mainly using a Gibson Les Paul Black Beauty with Bareknuckle Mississippi Queen pickups (humbucker sized P-90's)

While playing on live performances with Codeine Velvet Club, he tended to use a red Fender Stratocaster and a rosewood Fender Telecaster. During his solo career and his third run with the Fratellis, his preferred guitars were still Stratocasters and Telecasters.

== Backing band ==
- Lewis Gordon – Bass / backing vocals
- Will Foster – Keyboards / guitar
- Allan James – Drums
- Mince Fratelli – Drums / backing vocals / guitar

== Personal life ==
Lawler resides in Glasgow's West End with his wife, Heather Donnelly. Donnelly's burlesque name was used as the title and inspiration for the Fratellis' hit single, "Chelsea Dagger", a play on Britney Spears.

Lawler has a son named Jamie, born in 1998. Lawler is also an avid supporter of Celtic F.C.

== Discography ==
=== With The Fratellis ===
- Costello Music (2006)
- Here We Stand (2008)
- We Need Medicine (2013)
- Eyes Wide, Tongue Tied (2015)
- In Your Own Sweet Time (2018)
- Half Drunk Under a Full Moon (2021)

=== With Codeine Velvet Club ===
- Codeine Velvet Club, Codeine Velvet Club (2009)

=== Solo ===
- Psycho Jukebox, solo (2011)
- Bright Night Flowers, solo (2019)
