= Will Foster =

British musician

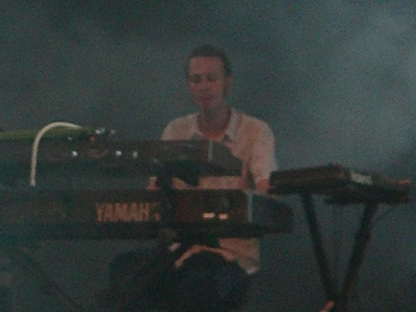
- Will Foster playing live with The Tears

Background information
- Born: William Foster
- Occupation(s): Musician, singer-songwriter
- Instrument(s): Piano, keyboards, guitar
- Years active: 1990–present
- Formerly of: Delicatessan, Lodger, The Width / The Girth, The Tears

Will Foster is an English musician, songwriter, and multi-instrumentalist. Over the course of his career, he has performed with groups including Delicatessen, Lodger, The Tears, and The Fratellis, as well as contributing to Jon Fratelli’s side projects.

== Career ==
=== Early years ===
Foster first came to prominence in the 1990s as a member of the art rock band Delicatessen. They would split in 1998 after releasing their third album There's No Confusing Some People. Following this, he co-founded the short-lived Lodger with former Delicatessen vocalist Neil Carlill, Supergrass drummer Danny Goffey and Pearl Lowe (Goffey's wife). During this time, Foster and Andrew Liles formed the project The Width / The Girth. This project would release a single cassette release in 1999.

After the demise of Lodger, Foster went on to play guitar and keyboards with Toshack Highway and Sophia, and also worked with Bermudan singer–songwriter Heather Nova. Around this time, he was a regular collaborator with the London-based band The Tin Apes, later continuing to work with their singer Paul Miller in the cult act The Miller Test.

In 2004, Foster joined The Tears, the band formed by ex-Suede members Brett Anderson and Bernard Butler. Foster played keyboards on their debut album Here Come the Tears and played live with them throughout their short run.

=== The Fratellis, Codeine Velvet Club and Jon Fratelli ===
Starting in 2008, Foster joined the Fratellis as a touring musician for their Here We Stand tour. He initially started playing keyboards before also taking up guitar during live performances during 2008 and 2009. The Fratellis would then go on hiatus following their touring commitments in 2009. He joined frontman Jon Fratelli as a session and touring musician for the side project Codeine Velvet Club, playing keyboards and guitar during live performances. For their album, Foster co-wrote the song "Nevada" with Fratelli and played keyboards on their cover of "I Am the Resurrection" originally by The Stone Roses, which was included on the album. Codeine Velvet Club would split up in 2010, after which Fratelli began a solo career.

Foster contributed to the recording sessions for Jon Fratelli's debut solo album Psycho Jukebox in Los Angeles and toured as part of his live band. During this time, Foster stopped playing guitar for live performances, focusing on keyboards only.

After the tour concluded, Foster was pictured in the studio with Fratelli recording his second solo album Bright Night Flowers in 2011. This album would be cancelled after the Fratellis announced their reunion in 2012. The band played their initial show back as a three-piece before Foster was brought back in for all future performances, featuring on keyboards. He also provided keyboards during the two live shows in support of Jon Fratelli's second album Bright Night Flowers, which was re-recorded in 2017 after the aborted sessions.
