= The Fratellis (EP) =

The Fratellis EP

EP by The Fratellis
- Released: 3 April 2006
- Recorded: 2006
- Genre: Indie rock
- Length: 9:05
- Label: Nomadic Music
- Producer: The Fratellis, Owen Morris, Andy Miller

The Fratellis chronology
The Fratellis EP (2006)	Costello Music (2006)

The Fratellis EP is the debut EP by Scottish band The Fratellis, released on 3 April 2006. There are a limited number of physical copies of this available in the UK. "Creepin' Up the Backstairs" was ineligible for the UK charts because the EP was limited in numbers and contained stickies. Although it was not released as a single, there has been a video recorded for "Creepin' Up the Backstairs", which is viewable on The Fratellis' website and YouTube. It also reached #84 on the UK Downloads Chart.

== Track listing ==
CD single, CD promo and pink 7" vinyl
No.	Title	Length
1.	"Creepin' Up the Backstairs"	3:10
2.	"Stacie Anne"	3:22
3.	"The Gutterati?"	2:29
