= Ole Black 'n' Blue Eyes EP =

EP by The Fratellis
- Released: 11 June 2007
- Recorded: 2006
- Genre: Indie rock
- Label: Universal-Island Records
- Producer: Tony Hoffer

The Fratellis chronology
Flathead EP (2007)	Ole Black 'n' Blue Eyes EP (2007)	Edgy in Brixton (2007)

Ole Black 'n' Blue Eyes EP is an EP by Scottish indie rock band The Fratellis. It was released in June 2007 as both a single and EP on limited edition vinyl. The track was the fifth and final single from their debut studio album Costello Music (2006).

== Release ==
The EP was released on a limited edition 12-inch vinyl, which contained stickers (which meant the copies were ineligible for the UK Singles Chart), which ultimately meant the single charted at #168 in the UK Singles Chart as it charted on the strength of downloads alone.

The B-side song Mon Yous, Mon Us, but No Them tells a story using names of the members from the Fratellis' official website. It is also used as a sign-off when Jon Fratelli posts on the site and is also in the footer of the website since the revamp in 2008.

== Music video ==
The animated video shows the band in a Wild West scene, chasing a female monster (with black and blue eyes) who constantly escapes. In the end, we learn that she also bails the Fratellis out of trouble and they eventually let her run off into the open desert freely.

== Track listing ==
Limited 12″, Sketched on one side.
No.	Title	Length
1.	"Ole Black 'n' Blue Eyes"	3:14
2.	"Baby’s Got a Brand New Second Hand Disguise"	3:01
3.	"Johnny Come Last"	3:27
4.	"Mon Yous, Mon Us, but No Them"	5:34

iTunes Live at Barrowland Download
No.	Title	Length
1.	"Ole Black 'n' Blue Eyes" (Live at Glasgow Barrowlands)	3:40
