= Henrietta (song) =

2006 single by the Fratellis

Single by the Fratellis

from the album Costello Music
- B-side: "Cigarello"; "3 Skinny Girls"
- Released: 12 June 2006
- Length: 3:32
- Label: Fallout
- Songwriter: The Fratellis
- Producer: Tony Hoffer

The Fratellis singles chronology
"Henrietta" (2006)	"Chelsea Dagger" (2006)

"Henrietta" is the debut single of Scottish rock band the Fratellis, released on 12 June 2006 as the first single their debut album, Costello Music (2006). It was their first UK top-20 hit, charting at number 19 on 18 June 2006.

== Track listings ==
CD single
No.	Title	Length
1.	"Henrietta"	3:33
2.	"Cigarello"	3:04

8-inch chocolate vinyl
No.	Title	Length
1.	"Henrietta"	3:33
2.	"3 Skinny Girls"	2:20

Digital download
No.	Title	Length
1.	"Henrietta"	3:33
2.	"Cigarello"	3:04
3.	"3 Skinny Girls"	2:20

== Charts ==
=== Weekly charts ===
Chart (2006)	Peak position
Scottish Singles Sales (Official Charts)	6
UK Singles (Official Charts)	19

=== Year-end charts ===
Chart (2006)	Position
UK Singles (OCC)	193

== Certifications ==
Region	Certification	Certified units/sales
United Kingdom (BPI)	Gold	400,000^{‡}
^{‡} Sales+streaming figures based on certification alone.
