= Here We Stand (The Fratellis album) =

Studio album by the Fratellis
- Released: 9 June 2008
- Recorded: November 2007 – January 2008 at Camel Toe Studio, Glasgow
- Genre: Rock
- Length: 52:29 (standard edition); 56:40 (deluxe edition)
- Label: Island
- Producer: The Fratellis

The Fratellis chronology
Costello Music (2006)	Here We Stand (2008)	We Need Medicine (2013)

Singles from Here We Stand
- 1. "Mistress Mabel" Released: 26 May 2008; 2. "Look Out Sunshine!" Released: 18 August 2008; 3. "A Heady Tale" Released: 22 December 2008

Professional ratings
Aggregate scores
Source	Rating
Metacritic	61/100
Review scores
Source	Rating
AllMusic	3.5/5 stars
Blender	2/5 stars
Digital Spy	3/5 stars
Drowned In Sound	3/10
NME	7/10
OMM	link
Pitchfork	3.6/10
PopMatters	4/10
Rolling Stone	3/5 stars
Spin	2.5/5 stars

Here We Stand is the second studio album by Scottish rock band the Fratellis, released on 9 June 2008. Self produced by the band in their own studio in Scotland, Here We Stand reached and peaked at number five in the UK Albums Chart on 15 June 2008.

Each single released off the album included three B-sides (except for "A Heady Tale" which only included two). "Tell Me a Lie" was featured on the EA Sports title FIFA 09, while "My Friend John" was on Forza Motorsport 3.

== Track listing ==
All songs written by Jon Fratelli, except where noted
No.	Title	Writer(s)	Length
1.	"My Friend John"		3:02
2.	"A Heady Tale"		4:53
3.	"Shameless"		3:56
4.	"Look Out Sunshine!"		3:53
5.	"Stragglers Moon"	Jon Fratelli and Bobby Troup	4:31
6.	"Mistress Mabel"		4:27
7.	"Jesus Stole My Baby "		4:24
8.	"Babydoll"		4:42
9.	"Tell Me a Lie"		3:58
10.	"Acid Jazz Singer"		4:22
11.	"Lupe Brown"		5:27
12.	"Milk and Money"		4:43
Total length:			52:29

Deluxe Edition
No.	Title	Length
13.	"Moriarty's Last Stand"	4:11

Japanese Bonus Track
No.	Title	Length
13.	"Nobody's Favourite Actor"	4:01
14.	"Ella's In the Band"	4:14

=== Deluxe Edition ===
As well as containing the entire album on a CD with bonus track "Moriarty's Last Stand", the deluxe edition also contained a DVD with the following:

- The Year of the Thief (Documentary)
- Live from Abbey Road (contains "Mistress Mabel", "Flathead" and "Milk and Money")
- Music Videos (contains "Mistress Mabel" and "Look Out Sunshine!")
- Live at the Fillmore, San Francisco (contains entire concert footage)

== Personnel ==
Band

- Jon Fratelli – Guitar, Piano, Vocals
- Barry Fratelli – Bass guitar
- Mince Fratelli – Drums

Additional Personnel

- Manager: Anthony McGill @ Numb Music
- Design: Traffic
- Cover Photography: Chip Simons
- Band Photography: Scarlett Page
- Logo: Mark James

Production

- The Fratellis - Producer
- Tom Lord-Alge - Mixing engineer
- Giles Hall and Paul Stacey - Mixing engineer for "Jesus Stole My Baby" at Strangeways studio, London
- Giles Hall - Mixing engineer for "Moriarty's Last Stand" at Cava Studios, Glasgow
- Giles Hall and Stuart McCredie - Engineer, assisted by Alan Moffat
- Recorded at The Playground, Glasgow
- Published by EMI Music Publishing
- Mike Mooney - Executive Producer for Island Records

Deluxe Version Credits

- Justin Kreutzmann - Editor and Director of "The Year of the Thief Documentary"
- Live at the Fillmore - Produced by Kendra Wester, Edited by Seb Lloyd and Sian Fever, Audio Recorded by Tony Brooke.
- Abbey Road - Produced by Michael Gleason and Peter van Hooke for Live from Abbey Road Ltd.

== Charts ==
Chart	Provider	Position	Sales	Certification
Irish Album Chart	IRMA	13		
UK Album Chart	The Official Charts Company	5	100,000+	Gold
US Billboard 200	Billboard	80	10,000+	
Swiss Album Chart		25		
Australian ARIA Album Chart		20		
