= Tony Hoffer =

American record producer

- Born: Anthony Hoffer; Memphis, Tennessee, U.S.
- Occupations: Record producer and mixer
- Years active: 1995–present
- Spouse: Bowie Sims (m. 2005)
- Children: 1

Tony Hoffer is an American record producer, songwriter, and music mixer.

== Career ==
Hoffer is credited for his work on multiple platinum-selling albums including Travis, The Kooks, The Thrills, Beck, Supergrass, Turin Brakes and Air.

His records have been nominated for Grammys, and British Mercury Prize Awards for his work with Beck, M83, Chromeo, Silversun Pickups, Depeche Mode and The Thrills.

Hoffer is most noted for his production and mixing of albums by Beck, The Fratellis (debuted at #2 in UK charts on 11 September 2006), The Kooks (one of the top-selling UK albums in 2006), M83, Belle & Sebastian, Fitz and the Tantrums and Air. Hoffer has also worked with Fischerspooner, Grandaddy, the French group Phoenix, Suede, Sondre Lerche, Turin Brakes and Canadian-Irish band Romes.

== Selected production/mix credits ==
- 1999: Midnite Vultures by Beck
- 2001: 10 000 Hz Legend by Air
- 2002: Life on Other Planets by Supergrass
- 2003: So Much for the City by The Thrills
- 2003: Ether Song by Turin Brakes
- 2004: Alphabetical by Phoenix
- 2004: Set Yourself On Fire by Stars
- 2005: Guero by Beck
- 2005: Odyssey (Fischerspooner album) by Fischerspooner
- 2006: The Life Pursuit by Belle & Sebastian
- 2006: Carnavas by Silversun Pickups
- 2006: Costello Music by The Fratellis
- 2006: The Truth by La Rocca
- 2006: Inside In/Inside Out by The Kooks
- 2007: "Berlin" (single mix) by Black Rebel Motorcycle Club (from Baby 81)
- 2007: Phantom Punch by Sondre Lerche
- 2007: Matinee by Jack Peñate
- 2007: Hourglass by Dave Gahan
- 2008: Konk by The Kooks
- 2008: Seventh Tree by Goldfrapp
- 2008: Ladyhawke by Ladyhawke
- 2009: Sounds of the Universe by Depeche Mode
- 2009: Swoon by Silversun Pickups
- 2010: Write About Love by Belle & Sebastian
- 2011: "I Would Do Anything for You" by Foster The People (from Torches)
- 2011: Junk of the Heart by The Kooks
- 2011: Hurry Up, We're Dreaming by M83
- 2011: Good & Evil by Tally Hall
- 2012: Pacifica (The Presets album) by The Presets
- 2012: The Temper Trap (album) by The Temper Trap
- 2013: More Than Just a Dream by Fitz and the Tantrums
- 2013: "I Won't Let You Down" by OK Go (from Hungry Ghosts)
- 2013: Love, Lust, Faith and Dreams by 30 Seconds To Mars
- 2014: Be Impressive by The Griswolds
- 2014: High Noon by The Arkells
- 2014: Daydream Forever by The Chain Gang of 1974
- 2015: My Type by Saint Motel
- 2015: Eyes Wide, Tongue Tied by The Fratellis
- 2015: Smile by The Royal Concept
- 2016: Junk by M83
- 2016: Believe EP by ROMES
- 2016: KIN by KT Tunstall
- 2017: ROMES by ROMES
- 2018: In Your Own Sweet Time by The Fratellis
- 2018: Art of Doubt by Metric
- 2018: Magic by Ben Rector
- 2018: Shake the Spirit by Elle King
- 2018: Head Over Heels by Chromeo
- 2019: The Cure To Loneliness by Jai Wolf
- 2019: Rebel Girl (Angels & Airwaves song) by Angels & Airwaves
- 2019: Kiss & Tell (Angels & Airwaves song) by Angels & Airwaves
- 2019: DSVII by M83
- 2020: Lonely Generation by Echosmith
- 2020: Friends in the Corner by Foxes
- 2020: Mixtape EP by The Snuts
- 2021: Bodies by AFI
- 2021: Half Drunk Under A Full Moon by The Fratellis
- 2021: W.L. (album) by The Snuts
- 2022: 40 oz. to Fresno by Joyce Manor
- 2022: Work Out by Rainbow Kitten Surprise
- 2022: Across That Fine Line by Nation of Language
- 2022: Formentera by Metric (band)
- 2023: Melodies On Hiatus by Albert Hammond Jr.
- 2023: Fantasy by M83
- 2023: It Will Never Be The Same by Michigander
- 2023: Panic by Yonaka
- 2023: Supermodels by Claud
- 2024: Millennials by The Snuts
- 2024: L.A. Times by Travis (band)
- 2024: Girl With No Face by Allie X
- 2024: Place That Makes Me Happy by The Moss
- 2024: On The Move by Chromeo & Cannons
- 2026: My Boy by Rob Cantor
