= Costello Music =

Studio album by the Fratellis
- Released: 11 September 2006
- Recorded: 2006
- Genres: Indie rock; garage rock revival
- Length: 44:16
- Labels: Fallout; Drop the Gun; Island
- Producer: Tony Hoffer

The Fratellis chronology
The Fratellis EP (2006)	Costello Music (2006)	Flathead EP (2007)

Singles from Costello Music
- 1. "Henrietta" Released: 12 June 2006; 2. "Chelsea Dagger" Released: 28 August 2006; 3. "Whistle for the Choir" Released: 27 November 2006; 4. "Flathead" Released: 4 March 2007; 5. "Baby Fratelli" Released: 12 March 2007; 6. "Ole Black 'n' Blue Eyes" Released: 11 June 2007

Costello Music is the debut album by Scottish indie rock band the Fratellis, released in the United Kingdom on 11 September 2006, by Fallout Records, Drop the Gun Recordings, and Island Records, and in the United States on 13 March 2007 on Cherrytree Records. The album was a commercial success, debuting at number two on the UK Albums Chart, behind Justin Timberlake's FutureSex/LoveSounds, ultimately spending 83 weeks in the top 100. Five singles were released from the album, as well as the download-only EP Flathead. "Chelsea Dagger" was the most successful single, peaking at number five in the UK and number four in the Netherlands, but the other singles failed to chart in most countries.

The band toured the record internationally, playing shows in Europe, the United States and Japan, and won the 2007 BRIT Award for Best British Breakthrough Act. As of March 2018, the album had sold 1,145,000 copies in the UK.

== Background ==
Shortly after their first gig in a Glasgow basement in February 2005, the band were spotted by a record company talent scout. Music Week's Stuart Clarke said, "A month after the scout discovered them, labels were flying up to Scotland to see them. Most, if not all, the major labels and a handful of indies showed a lot of interest in the band." The band was eventually signed to Island Records and was flown to Los Angeles to record the album in the Sunset Sound recording studio, which was previously used by Bob Dylan and the Beach Boys. Jon said, "It makes you feel a bit more like you’re part of something you were interested in". Producer Tony Hoffer was flown in to help complete the album, which was recorded in the complex's recording space Studio 3 using vintage equipment. The album, released under Island's UK subsidiary Fallout Records, was named "Costello Music" after a studio the group used to rent in Budhill, Glasgow.

== Lyrics and composition ==
Critics likened the album to the works of The Libertines, Babyshambles and Arctic Monkeys, all bands known for their British rock roots. Sal Cinquemani of Slant Magazine said that "they sound like songs by about 15 other Britpop acts" but went on to say "it's one thing to copy a look, a sound, or a formula, it's another to do it so utterly convincingly and with such infectious raucousness".

Paul McNamee of NME noted that most tracks on the album told a story; "Henrietta", tells the story of an older woman who stalks the song's narrators; "Vince the Lovable Stoner" is about a man with a drug addiction, and "Chelsea Dagger" is said by Jon Fratelli to be about a showgirl.

== Release ==
Costello Music was released on vinyl and CD on 11 September 2006 in the UK. Five songs were released as singles; "Henrietta", "Chelsea Dagger", "Whistle for the Choir", "Baby Fratelli" and "Ole Black 'n' Blue Eyes". "Flathead" was used in an iPod commercial, which led to it being released as a download only single via iTunes and later as an EP. The album was then released on 13 March 2007 in the US. The cover art for the album and its singles was created by Sam Hadley.

The album did best in the UK, peaking at number two on the charts there. It reached forty-eight on the US Billboard 200, and managed to chart in Switzerland, Austria, the Netherlands, France, New Zealand and Canada, where it reached sixty-one. "Chelsea Dagger" was the most successful single, peaking at five in the UK and four in the Netherlands. The other singles with the exception of "Flathead" only managed to chart in the UK, where they were moderately popular.

A Japanese version of Costello Music was released on 21 February 2007 containing two tracks unavailable on other versions: "Dirty Barry Stole the Bluebird" – a B-side of the "Chelsea Dagger" single, and "Cigarello" from the Flathead EP. This version of the album also contained the videos for "Flathead", "Chelsea Dagger", and "Henrietta", which could be viewed directly from the disc using an Adobe Flash program.

The album's success led to the band winning the BRIT award for Best British Breakthrough Act in 2007. The album also won an EBBA award in January 2008. In total, the band sold 1.5 million copies of Costello Music worldwide and over 900,000 copies in the UK.

== Reception ==
Professional ratings
Aggregate scores
Source	Rating
Metacritic	71/100
Review scores
Source	Rating
AllMusic	4/5 stars
NME	8/10 stars
Pitchfork	5.5/10
Rolling Stone	3.5/5 stars
Slant Magazine	2.5/5 stars
Stylus Magazine	B

Costello Music received generally favourable reviews. Pitchfork's Stuart Bertman called the Fratellis "artless but amiable", "predictable", and "intermittently rewarding". Elizabeth Goodman of Rolling Stone called the single Flathead "preternaturally catchy" and stated that "it makes you elated in the moment". Heather Phares of AllMusic called it "high energy" and "fun in the moment". Stylus Magazine's Ryan Foley shared similar views, describing it as "beyond infectious" and claiming that they fill "their three-minute, pop-punk ditties with melodic snarl, flouncing sass, and enough lusty sing-along parts to keep the punters busy". IGN's Chad Grischow gave the album an Outstanding rating in his review of the album saying it was "not the most refined album you will buy this year, but surely one you will not regret". Sal Cinquemani of Slant Magazine was less favourable, calling it "tediously misogynistic" and "instantly memorable but thankfully wordless".

Costello Music was voted the fourth-worst Scottish album ever in a 2007 online poll of music fans.

== Tour ==
Following the release of the album, the Fratellis embarked on a tour of the UK festival circuit, headlining at popular festivals such as NME's Rock ‘n’ Riot tour and T in the Park 2007, amongst others. They opened for The Who at the BBC Electric Proms in October 2006, and in December they supported Kasabian on their UK tour before playing 10 dates by themselves in February and March 2007. The locations included Nottingham, Manchester, Glasgow, Birmingham and London.

The band then set out on a worldwide tour to play dates in Japan, continental Europe and the US. They cut short the US leg of their tour, canceling nine dates, citing fatigue from their many months of touring as the cause.

== Track listing ==
All tracks are written by the Fratellis.

No.	Title	Length
1.	"Henrietta"	3:32
2.	"Flathead"	3:17
3.	"Cuntry Boys & City Girls"	3:31
4.	"Whistle for the Choir"	3:35
5.	"Chelsea Dagger"	3:35
6.	"For the Girl"	2:48
7.	"Doginabag"	3:20
8.	"Creepin up the Backstairs"	3:07
9.	"Vince the Loveable Stoner"	3:14
10.	"Everybody Knows You Cried Last Night"	3:54
11.	"Baby Fratelli"	3:56
12.	"Got Ma Nuts from a Hippy"	3:11
13.	"Ole Black 'n' Blue Eyes"	3:16
Total length:		44:16

=== Bonus tracks ===
- "The Gutterati?" – 2:28 (Replaces "Cuntry Boys & City Girls" on US version as Track No. 5, moving "Whistle for the Choir" to Track No. 3 and "Chelsea Dagger" to Track #4)
- "Ole Black 'n' Blue Eyes" is a hidden track on the US version.
- "Dirty Barry Stole the Bluebird" – 4:04 (Bonus track on Japanese version)
- "Cigarello" – 3:06 (Bonus track on Japanese version)
- Some versions of the CD have the track "Cuntry Boys & City Girls" moved to a hidden track, Track No. 13.

== Personnel ==
- Jon Fratelli – lead vocals, guitar
- Barry Fratelli – bass guitar, backing vocals
- Mince Fratelli – drums, backing vocals, banjo
- Tony Hoffer – production, mixing
- Todd Burke and Tony Hoffer – engineering
- Shane Watson – horn

== Charts ==
=== Weekly charts ===
Chart (2006–2007)	Peak position
Australian Albums (ARIA)	57
Austrian Albums (Ö3 Austria)	50
Belgian Albums (Ultratop Flanders)	89
Dutch Albums (Album Top 100)	13
German Albums (Offizielle Top 100)	59
French Albums (SNEP)	98
New Zealand Albums (RMNZ)	39
Scottish Albums (Official Charts)	1
Swiss Albums (Schweizer Hitparade)	78
UK Albums (Official Charts)	2
UK Album Downloads (Official Charts)	2
US Billboard 200	48
US Top Rock Albums (Billboard)	15

=== Year-end charts ===
Chart (2006)	Position
UK Albums (OCC)	23
Chart (2007)	Position
UK Albums (OCC)	25

== Certifications ==
Certifications for Costello Music
Region	Certification	Certified units/sales
Japan (RIAJ)	Gold	100,000^{^}
New Zealand (RMNZ)	Gold	7,500^{‡}
United Kingdom (BPI)	4× Platinum	1,200,000^{‡}
Summaries
Europe (IFPI)	Platinum	1,000,000^{*}
^{*} Sales figures based on certification alone.^{^} Shipments figures based on certification alone.^{‡} Sales+streaming figures based on certification alone.
