= Primavera Sound 2016 =

Music festival in Barcelona, Spain

The Primavera Sound 2016 was held on 30 May to 5 June 2016 at the Parc del Fòrum, Barcelona, Spain.

The headliners were Radiohead, LCD Soundsystem, Sigur Rós, PJ Harvey, Tame Impala, and The Last Shadow Puppets.

== Lineup ==
Headline performers are listed in boldface. Artists listed from latest to earliest set times.

=== Heineken ===
Thursday, 2 June	Friday, 3 June	Saturday, 4 June
**LCD Soundsystem**; Explosions in the Sky; Daughter; Algiers	Beach House; **Radiohead**; Savages	Moderat; **PJ Harvey**; Brian Wilson performing Pet Sounds; Wild Nothing

Heineken headlining set lists
LCD Soundsystem
1. "Us v Them"
2. "Daft Punk Is Playing at My House"
3. "I Can Change"
4. "Get Innocuous!"
5. "You Wanted a Hit"
6. "Tribulations"
7. "Movement"
8. "Yeah"
9. "Someone Great"
10. "Losing My Edge"
11. "Home"
12. "New York, I Love You but You're Bringing Me Down"
13. "Dance Yrself Clean"
14. "All My Friends"
Radiohead
1. "Burn the Witch"
2. "Daydreaming"
3. "Decks Dark"
4. "Desert Island Disk"
5. "Ful Stop"
6. "The National Anthem"
7. "Talk Show Host"
8. "Lotus Flower"
9. "No Surprises"
10. "Pyramid Song"
11. "The Numbers"
12. "Karma Police"
13. "Weird Fishes / Arpeggi"
14. "Everything in Its Right Place"
15. "Idioteque"
16. "Bodysnatchers"
17. "Street Spirit (Fade Out)"

Encore

18. "Bloom"
19. "Paranoid Android"
20. "Nude"
21. "2 + 2 = 5"
22. "There There"

Encore 2

23. "Creep"
PJ Harvey
1. "Chain of Keys"
2. "The Ministry of Defence"
3. "The Community of Hope"
4. "A Line in the Sand"
5. "The Orange Monkey"
6. "Let England Shake"
7. "The Words That Maketh Murder"
8. "The Glorious Land"
9. "Medicinals"
10. "When Under Ether"
11. "Dollar, Dollar"
12. "The Wheel"
13. "The Ministry of Social Affairs"
14. "50ft Queenie"
15. "Down by the Water"
16. "To Bring You My Love"
17. "River Anacostia"

=== H&M ===
Thursday, 2 June	Friday, 3 June	Saturday, 4 June
**Tame Impala**; Air; The James Hunter Six	**The Last Shadow Puppets**; Beirut; Titus Andronicus; Dungen	**Sigur Rós**; Deerhunter; Manel

H&M headlining set lists
Tame Impala
1. "Nangs"
2. "Let It Happen"
3. "Mind Mischief"
4. "Why Won't They Talk to Me?"
5. "It Is Not Meant to Be"
6. "The Moment"
7. "Elephant"
8. "Yes I'm Changing"
9. "The Less I Know the Better"
10. "Daffodils"
11. "Eventually"
12. "Apocalypse Dreams"
13. "Feels Like We Only Go Backwards"
14. "New Person, Same Old Mistakes"
The Last Shadow Puppets
1. "Miracle Aligner"
2. "Standing Next to Me"
3. "Used to Be My Girl"
4. "The Element of Surprise"
5. "Aviation"
6. "Dracula Teeth"
7. "Calm Like You"
8. "The Age of the Understatement"
9. "Everything You've Come to Expect"
10. "Bad Habits"
11. "Only the Truth"
12. "My Mistakes Were Made for You"
13. "Is This What You Wanted"
14. "Sweet Dreams, TN"
15. "In My Room"

Encore

16. "I Want You (She's So Heavy)"
17. "Meeting Place"
Sigur Rós
1. "Óveður"
2. "Starálfur"
3. "Sæglópur"
4. "Glósóli"
5. "Vaka"
6. "Ný batterí"
7. "E-Bow"
8. "Festival"
9. "Yfirborð"
10. "Kveikur"
11. "Hafsól"

Encore

12. "Popplagið"

=== Primavera ===
Wednesday, 1 June	Thursday, 2 June	Friday, 3 June	Saturday, 4 June
Suede; Goat; Sr. Chinarro; El Último Vecino; Doble Pletina	Thee Oh Sees; John Carpenter; Suuns; Beak>; Mueran Humanos	Kiasmos; Tortoise; Freddie Gibbs; Neil Michael Hagerty & The Howling Hex; White Fence	Ty Segall and the Muggers; Action Bronson; Drive Like Jehu; Autolux; Boredoms

=== Ray-Ban ===
Thursday, 2 June	Friday, 3 June	Saturday, 4 June
Optimo Espacio; Battles; Mbongwana Star; Floating Points (Live); Destroyer; Cass McCombs; Autumn Comets	Maceo Plex; The Avalanches; Animal Collective; Dinosaur Jr.; Selda Bağcan & Boom Pam; Ben Watt Band feat. Bernard Butler; Inspira	DJ Coco; Pantha du Prince presents The Triad; Julia Holter; Orchestra Baobab; Richard Hawley; The Chills; Joana Serrat

=== Pitchfork ===
Thursday, 2 June	Friday, 3 June	Saturday, 4 June
Hudson Mohawke; Neon Indian; Beach Slang; Protomartyr; Vince Staples; Empress Of; Car Seat Headrest; Nothing Places	DJ Koze; Evian Christ; Holly Herndon; Royal Headache; Jay Rock; Nao; Moses Sumney; Aliment	DJ Richard; Roosevelt; Parquet Courts; Chairlift; Pusha T; Jenny Hval; Dâm-Funk; The Saurs

=== Adidas Originals ===
Thursday, 2 June	Friday, 3 June	Saturday, 4 June
White Reaper; Fasenuova; Holögrama; Har Mar Superstar; A.R. Kane; C+C=Maxigross; Julien Baker; Alberto Montero	Sheer Mag; Shura; C. Tangana; Shellac; Cavern of Anti-Matter; Steve Gunn; Alex G; Viva Belgrado	Islam Chipsy & EEK; HO99O9; Unsane; Venom; Los Chichos; PXXR GVNG; U.S. Girls; Pájaro Jack

=== Nightpro ===
Thursday, 2 June	Friday, 3 June	Saturday, 4 June
Jay Cubed; Moonchild Sanelly; Gang of Youths; Jack Carty; Inky; DTSQ; Dead Buttons; Wedance; O Terno; Tiny Fingers; Cut Out Club; Noga Erez	Böira; Altre di B; Methyl Ethel; Merkabah; Matilde Davoli; Anam; Tunacola; Nuven; Quarto Negro; Mahmed; Chicago Toys; Oh Pep!	Water Rats; The Meanies; Los Outsaiders; Money for Rope; RSS Boys; Sun Glitters; Wolves As Friends; Sycamore Age; Kanaku y el Tigre; Gala Brié; Aldo the Band; Planeta No

=== Auditori Rockdelux ===
Thursday, 2 June	Friday, 3 June	Saturday, 4 June
Kamasi Washington; Suede Night Thoughts; Andy Shauf; Alessandro Cortini	Robert Forster; Cabaret Voltaire; Richard Dawson; Lubomyr Melnyk	Current 93; Angel Witch; Six Organs of Admittance; Baby Dee

=== Heineken Hidden Stage ===
Thursday, 2 June	Friday, 3 June	Saturday, 4 June
Peaches; Lee Ranaldo & El Rayo	Lush; Los Hermanos Cubero	Cat's Eyes; Bob Mould

=== Ray-Ban Unplugged ===
Thursday, 2 June	Friday, 3 June	Saturday, 4 June
Jessy Lanza; El Último Vecino; Gang of Youths; White Reaper	Chicago Toys; Aliment; Jack Carty; Bearoid	The Meanies; Money for Rope; Mueran Humanos; Die Katapult

=== Firestone Stage ===
Thursday, 2 June	Friday, 3 June	Saturday, 4 June
Beach Slang	Shura	Cass McCombs

=== Bowers & Wilkins Sound System ===
Thursday, 2 June	Friday, 3 June	Saturday, 4 June
Helena Hauff; Powell; Architectural; Broken English Club (Live); Eduardo de la Calle; Pina (Live); Raudive; Klavikon; Har Mar Superstar (DJ set); Jessy Lanza (DJ set); Todd Terje; Erol Alkan; Floating Points; Rory Phillips	Tiger & Woods; The Maghreban; Black Devil Disco Club (Live); Daniel Kyo; Sophie; Begun; DJ Koze; Black Lips (DJ set); Bradford Cox; DJ Supermarkt; Maceo Plex B2B Maars; Simian Mobile Disco (DJ set); Mano Le Tough; Scharre	Disco Finale; I-F; Dorisburg (Live); Lena Willikens; Cleveland (Live); Daniel Baughman; DJ Richard; Suzanne Kraft; Dave P; Faris Badwan; Trevor Jackson; Leon Vynehall; Matthew Dear; Bob Mould

== Primavera a la Ciutat lineup ==
=== Sala Apolo ===
Monday, 30 May	Tuesday, 31 May	Wednesday, 1 June	Sunday, 5 June
Psychic TV / PTV3; Mar Otra Vez	Deradoorian; SG Lewis; Carla	Optimo Espacio; Suuns; White Fence; Stara Rzeka	Dave P; The Avalanches; Ty Segall and the Muggers; Univers; Siberian Wolves

=== La [2] de Apolo ===
Tuesday, 31 May	Wednesday, 1 June	Sunday, 5 June
RSS Boys; Merkabah; Noga Erez	Barry Hogan (DJ set); Younghusband; Mueran Humanos	Boston Pizza (DJ set); Wind Atlas; +++; Cadena

=== Barts ===
Wednesday, 1 June
- Daniel Gon
- Jessy Lanza
- Empress Of
- Daniel Gon

=== Daypro ===
Wednesday, 1 June	Thursday, 2 June	Friday, 3 June	Saturday, 4 June	Sunday, 5 June
Bearoid; Esperit!; Carla; Planeta No; Núria Graham	Money for Rope; The Meanies; Methyl Ethel; Gang of Youths; Oh Pep!; Jack Carty; Tiny Fingers; Cut Out Club; Noga Erez	Jay Cubed; DTSQ; Dead Buttons; Wedance; Moonchild Sanelly; Chicago Toys; Tunacola; Matilde Davoli; Anam	Badlands; Sycamore Age; Altre di B; Matilde Davoli; Sun Glitters; Odd Cherry Pie; Mahmed; Nuven; Quarto Negro	Water Rats; Inky; O Terno; Aldo the Band; Altre di B; Sycamore Age

=== Escenario Martini ===
Friday, 3 June	Saturday, 4 June	Sunday, 5 June
C+C=Maxigross; Julien Baker; Cala Vento; Baywaves	Robert Forster; A.R. Kane; Die Katapult; My Expansive Awareness	Black Lips; Mudhoney; Bradford Cox; Downtown Boys; Power Burkas; Twin Drama

=== Sala Teatre ===
Friday, 3 June	Saturday, 4 June	Sunday, 5 June
Andy Shauf; Cass McCombs; Shinkiro; Big Summer	Old King Cole Younger; Alex G; Pumuky; Invisible Harvey	Bearoid; The Handclappers; Esperit!; Pacosan; Ran Ran Ran; Redthread
