= Everything You've Come to Expect =

2016 studio album by The Last Shadow Puppets

Studio album by the Last Shadow Puppets
- Released: 1 April 2016
- Recorded: 2015
- Studios: Shangri-La, Malibu, California
- Genres: Baroque pop; orchestral soul; psychedelic pop
- Length: 37:23
- Label: Domino
- Producer: James Ford

The Last Shadow Puppets chronology
The Age of the Understatement (2008)	Everything You've Come to Expect (2016)	The Dream Synopsis (2016)

Singles from Everything You've Come to Expect
- 1. "Bad Habits" Released: 10 January 2016; 2. "Everything You've Come to Expect" Released: 10 March 2016; 3. "Aviation" Released: 16 March 2016; 4. "Miracle Aligner" Released: 28 March 2016

Everything You've Come to Expect is the second studio album by English supergroup the Last Shadow Puppets, released on 1 April 2016 by Domino Recording Company. It was written by band co-frontmen Alex Turner and Miles Kane in 2014 between London, Paris and Los Angeles. Production was done in Malibu by fellow member James Ford, alongside guest musician Matt Helders, new bass player, Zach Dawes and featuring once again string arrangements by Owen Pallett. The album artwork features a photo of singer Tina Turner dancing, as photographed by Jack Robinson Jr. in November 1969; the original picture was modified by illustrator Matthew Cooper, who gave it a gold tint.

Everything You've Come to Expect features a wide array of genres that include baroque pop, orchestral soul and psychedelic pop, with influences from desert rock, post-punk, funk, disco and Italian film scores. The lyrical content explores themes of hedonism, romance and self-doubt, and a retelling of the nightlife adventures of two young rockstars. The album was released to generally positive reviews from critics, who mostly noted the band's evolution from the genre pastiche of their debut album. Welcoming their new style, while staying true to their sound. Everything You've Come to Expect became the Last Shadow Puppets' second and Turner’s seventh consecutive number-one debut in the UK, also topping the charts in Belgium. Following its release, the album was promoted by the singles "Bad Habits" and "Aviation", as well as a global tour and multiple television appearances.

== Background and recording ==
The band's first album The Age of the Understatement was released eight years prior, in 2008, to critical acclaim. Since then, Turner had released three albums with Arctic Monkeys, Humbug (2009), Suck It and See (2011), and AM (2013), as well as composing the acoustic soundtrack for the feature film Submarine (2010). Meanwhile, Kane had released his first two albums as a solo artist, Colour of the Trap (2011) and Don't Forget Who You Are (2013).

Following the release of Kane's sophomore record, him and Turner were on the process of writing, what at the time, was thought to be Kane's next album. During one of those writing sessions, both "experimented with a vocal harmony" on a 8-track demo, which would later become "Aviation". This reminded them of their work on The Age of the Understament, but also they felt it was, "promising, in that it suggested there was somewhere to go with it as well". The album was written on acoustic guitar and on a Vox Continental keyboard, between Kane's apartments in London, Paris and Los Angeles. Most of the songs did not make the album, except for "Pattern", which the Last Shadow Puppets said was "the oldest song" in the album, in contrast with "Everything You've Come to Expect", which was the last thing written for the record. They contacted fellow member James Ford, and played him the demos, who agreed to join them.

In the summer of 2015, the Last Shadow Puppets began recording material at Rick Rubin's Shangri La Studios in Malibu, California, their first choice was La Fabrique Studios in Saint-Rémy-de-Provence, France, but it was already booked. Core member and drummer James Ford produced Everything You've Come to Expect. The album features string arrangements from frequent collaborator Owen Pallett, originally the plan was for Pallett to go to the studio for two days, and then work independently from the band, but he ended up staying in the studio until the end of the sessions. Turner said Pallett helped in making the songs feel more cohesive, as he thought before he came in, "the recordings were a bit all over the place". The Last Shadow Puppets were also joined for the first time by Zach Dawes from Mini Mansions, on bass. Dawes later continued as a member during their live performances. Everything You've Come to Expect was recorded in three weeks, with all members in "one room", which Turner claims he had not done since Suck It and See. The string parts were written on piano and later done separately in Hollywood studio United Recording. Turner recalled the sessions, felt like "a holiday" similarly to the ones for the first album, Pallett agreed and thought they were more "like hanging out with mates than work". When not in the studio the band would spend their time swimming, going to a nearby karaoke bar and to a sports bar.

== Composition ==
=== Musical style and influences ===
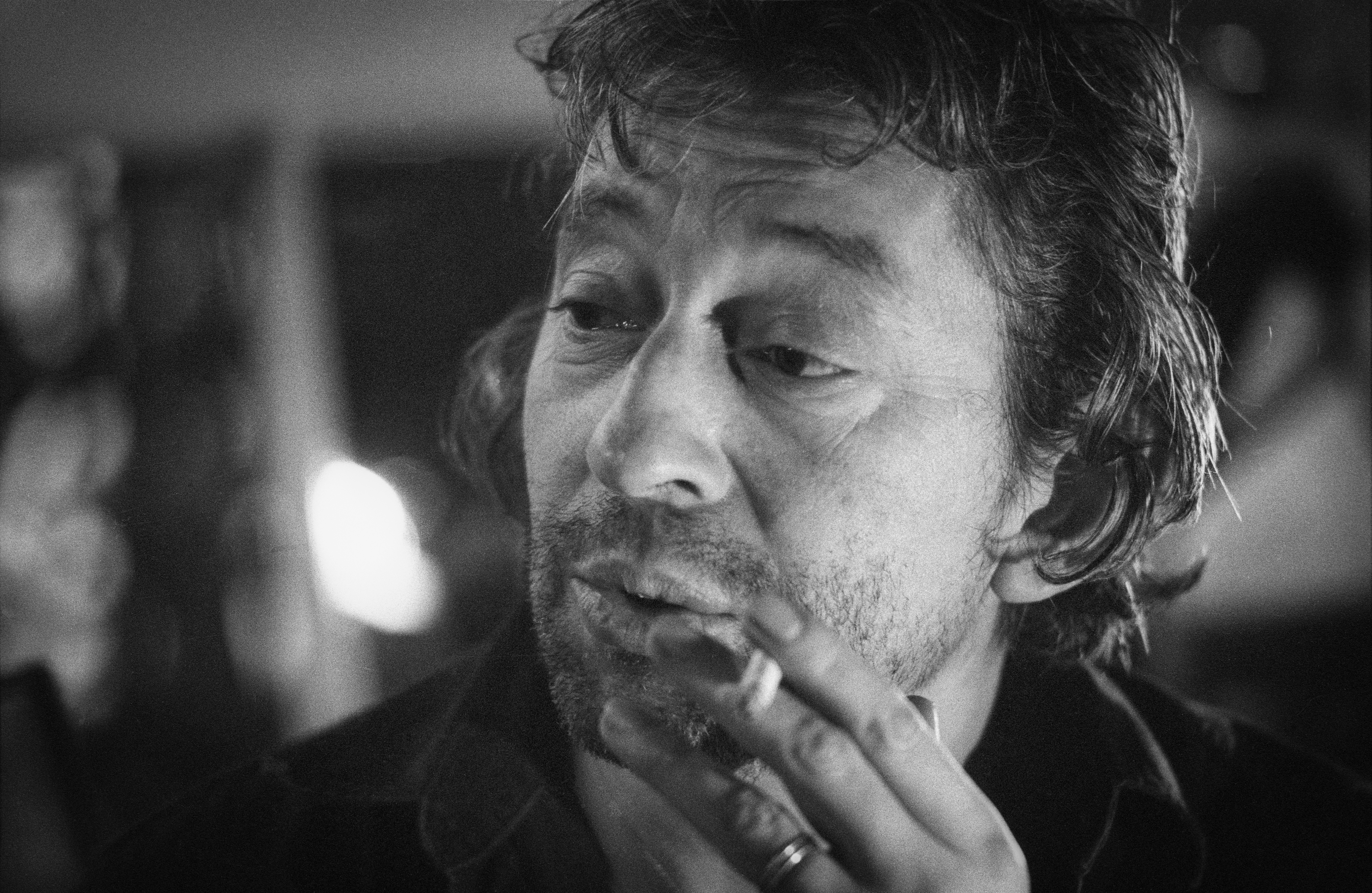
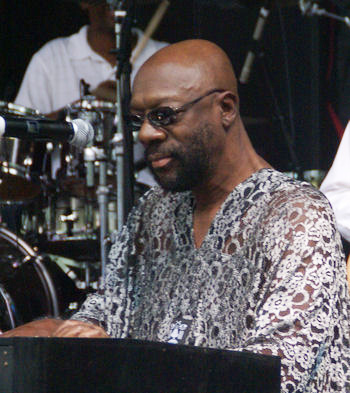
Serge Gainsbourg (left) and Isaac Hayes (right) were cited by the band and several music critics, as having influenced the album's style.

Musically, Everything You've Come to Expect has been described as "a louche canon of swooning noir-pop" that sounds "indebted to the baroque soundscapes of the 1960s". It has been characterised as Baroque pop, orchestral soul and psychedelic pop. The album further incorporates influences from desert rock, post-punk, funk, disco and Italian film scores. It has been compared to the works of Jean-Claude Vannier, Serge Gainsbourg, Isaac Hayes, the Replacements, Queens of the Stone Age and its lead singer Josh Homme, Lou Reed and Scott Walker. In an interview with NME, the Last Shadow Puppets stated that their songwriting was influenced by Hayes and the Style Council, as opposed to the Scott Walker influences of their first album. Turner cited English singer David Bowie as being "sort of in the DNA of every record, to some extent. He's been built-in for a long time" and Gainsbourg, "I always just keep trying to make everything sound like Melody Nelson and getting nowhere near." The band also mentioned, Television, Foals, David Axelrod, Sparks, Dr. Hook's "When You're in Love with a Beautiful Woman", and Ned Doheny's "Get It Up for Love" as inspiration, as well as, Tears For Fears, Depeche Mode, and the Prodigy as bands they were listening to at the time. Turner further cited the bass line to Sonic's Rendezvous Band's "City Slang" as a heavy inspiration for "Bad Habits".

=== Lyrics and themes ===
"Songs like 'Everything You've Come to Expect' go into the more surreal and abstract, but on the other hand, Sweet Dreams, TN is way more direct and personal than anything I've written before, working with Miles makes me feel more confident about going in both of those directions. And when he plays guitar, he makes it sound like it's got about eight strings."

— Alex Turner for Q, April 2016

Lyrically, Everything You've Come to Expect's main themes are hedonism, romance and self doubt. With the songs alluding to: sex and free love, recreational drug use, prostitution, jealousy, dreams and homoerotic imagery. Being mainly "about the shenanigans young rock stars get up to in LA; lust figures often", it was described as "a west coast film noir fever dream, scored by Ennio Morricone, with Kane and Turner the doomed protagonists". The lyrics are a departure from The Age of the Understatement and have been compared to the ones in other works by Turner, such as the "insecurity" found in Submarine and "metaphors straight from Arctic Monkeys' fourth album Suck It and See". The album setting revolves around Los Angeles and the West Coast, and includes references to the neighbourhood of Los Feliz and cities outside the United States, such as Sheffield and Paris. Turner thought the lyrics on this record were "more effective and more refined" than the ones on their debut and that they had achieved something "slightly more surreal or abstract". He further added, "You still, arguably, sometimes reach more or evoke more interest in feelings when you're not telling a story and someone is not right there with you. You just sort of create an atmosphere."

=== Songs ===
"Aviation", the opening track of Everything You've Come to Expect, begins with an "echoing scrape of strings". Its first verse references sectoral heterochromia, an eye condition in which part of one eye is a different color from its remainder. Turner wanted to use the word "Colorama" in a song since the first time he saw Michelangelo Antonioni's Blow-Up (1966), he described it as, "an unplugged neon light at the back of my mind for years", about the line he added, "It doesn't make a ton of sense, but that's not really the point. I think, not always, but sometimes it's good to just have the lyrics facilitate a melody, like, that's harder to do, [...] — getting the fuckin’ ‘I Am The Walrus’ shit right." Musically, the track has been described as coming closest to the "Lee Hazlewood-indebted style" of their first record.

On "Miracle Aligner", the album is at its most "lush" and "seductive". The song has a "breezy melody" and makes use of "tremolo-heavy guitars". The duo jokingly claimed the song was inspired by a "yoga teacher" and a "make-believe wrestler". Turner has said the beginnings of the song are "really old", with "Miracle Aligner" mostly written by himself and musician Alexandra Savior. Originally written for her debut album, "it ended up being under the Shadow Puppets umbrella". Savior rejected the song, saying, "it's obviously about a coke dealer - it's a lifestyle that I didn't relate to myself". Musically it has been described as "honeyed soul-pop".

"Everything You've Come to Expect" is a "psychedelic waltz" and has been called "Beatle-esque". The song finds Turner as "a jealous guy", among a "phantasmagoria of surreal visions of decadence." The song references several songs and musicians, with the line "Croc-skin collar on a diamond dog" recalling Bowie's album of the same name (1974). The mention of Honey Pie on the preceding verse, was thought to be a Beatles reference, although Turner admitted it was coincidental. Another line, "I just can't get the thought of you and him out of my head", was described as "textbook Turner lust", with one reviewer alluding to an homoerotic reading of the line, noting that "Maybe they're singing it at each other". The band has said it was the last song written for Everything You've Come to Expect and "the further down the wing" they have gone in terms of songwriting, adding that its their favourite track in the record. "The Element of Surprise" has been called a ballad "direct from a past era" that finds producer James Ford "steering closer to his dance music origins", soft-rock and a funk track "that sounds like the Rat Pack performing inside George Clinton's Holy Mothership". "Bad Habits" has been described as a "sinister punk mariachi groover" driven by "Pallet’s violins", with "Iggy Pop-like intensity". The song started with Turner playing the bass line, inspired by the one in Sonic's Rendezvous Band's "City Slang". The stream of consciousness lyrics were edited down from the original 40 minute long take, where Kane started reciting words without repeating himself once. Kane highlighted Ford's work in the song "to make it a pop song with, like, a punky edge".

On "Sweet Dreams, TN", Turner "approximates a Nashville crooner" and has an "Elvis-in Vegas-turn" in what has been described as a "career best vocal". The song has a "bolero-like staccato rhythm and slapback echo-drenched vocal". It started when Turner sat down "playing an old Roy Orbison riff on an acoustic". The track is a love song for his at the time girlfriend, Taylor Bagley, and the most direct piece of writing in the record, "That tune actually is perhaps the only one where i sat down and it is just what it is, That's straightforward that", Turner has said. Bagley convinced him to put the song on the record as he at first thought "There was almost too much truth in it or something". In a 2018 interview Turner retracted the previous statement by saying that he "Perhaps [I] even went too far on purpose", by exaggerating some aspects lyrically to fit the mold of a love song, also citing "The Dream Synopsis" as an example. It has been described as "country-tinged" and "lounge singer grandeur".

"Used to Be My Girl" is a "Homme-tinged desert rider", with lyrics that evoke a "quasi comic self loathing". "She Does the Woods" is punctuated by "high-drama stabs". Turner said the track improved after Pallet's arrangements were added, and was direct about the lyrics, "Its pretty obvious that its about shagging in the woods". Both tracks are a "double bill of [...] moodier tunes" and due to their placement on the album have been said to "evoke the sense it's one epic track", both likened to a mix of previous Arctic Monkeys' works, "Suck It and See infused with the darker rhythms of Humbug". "Pattern" is an orchestral pop track with "Isaac Hayes influenced" strings, that give it "a soulful swagger". Lyrically, the song is a the-morning-after-several-nights-in-a-row-before lament.

The final track of Everything You've Come to Expect, "The Dream Synopsis", finds Turner at his most "lugubrious and lizardy". As the title describes, in the song he recounts his dreams to another person. He said of the track "It's almost like when you do talk about your dreams to someone, it's always the fucking most boring [...] And I thought, perhaps, if you added a melody and surrounded it by music, maybe it's more compelling. Marginally more compelling". The first verse references Turner's time as a part-time bartender at the Boardwalk during the early years of his career. The line "And a wicked gale came howling up through Sheffield City Centre / There was palm tree debris everywhere" was an attempt to connect his native Sheffield with his, at the time, residence of Los Angeles. It further references the neighbourhood of Los Feliz and Miles Kane. Kane recalled the song being more "upbeat" in the beginning, and that it took them a while "to get it [...] slow". Turner added that, this type of song is his "default position". Turner claimed "It's a love song, after all. For a girl." "The Bourne Identity" is a "violin-heavy hero's lament", which stands as the last track on the deluxe version of the album. The song "comes back to imposter syndrome". Both closers have had its sound compared to "vintage Lennon, Bowie and Lou Reed" with "The Bourne Identity" further feeling "like a direct continuation of Turner's serene Submarine".

== Artwork and title ==
The art for Everything You've Come to Expect consists of a photo of singer Tina Turner dancing, as photographed by Jack Robinson in November 1969 in New York City. Alex Turner had a replica of the photograph, which was gifted to him by a friend, hanging in his kitchen for many years. Both him and Kane chose the image, as they thought that it would make a great album cover. After the record was done they got in touch with Tina Turner's team and she agreed. Illustrator Matthew Cooper modified the original image and gave it a gold tint "to create an identifiable colour scheme and a warmer, more contemporary feel". Cooper told the BBC: "The idea was to move the artwork on from the ’60s feel of the first Last Shadow Puppets album artwork, so here is Tina on the very cusp of the 1970s". The record cover beat Blackstar by Bowie to win the prize for best album artwork 2016, a prize that was organised by Art Vinyl.

The title comes from the track of the same name, as the Last Shadow Puppets thought it was the "centerpiece" of the record. Alex Turner has also described it as "sort of a joke" because the band has only one other album, so there would not be that much to be expectant about. He also thought the string arrangements made the project inherently "sophisticated and elegant", which reflected in the title in "an amusing way", comparing it to a cognac advertisement.

== Release and promotion ==
After speculation about work on Everything You've Come to Expect sparked by a tweet from Pallett, Ford stated in November 2015 that the album had been finished. The release of Everything You've Come to Expect was first announced on 3 December 2015, through a short video directed by Ben Chappell. The video depicted Turner walking through the studio towards the recording booth, interpersed with other shots of the Last Shadow Puppets. The video also features Ford, an orchestral theme sounds throughout, and ends with a title card announcing the band would be back in the Summer of 2016. Another teaser was released on 28 December and included snippets of new music. On 21 January 2016, the Last Shadow Puppets announced Everything You've Come to Expect would be released on 1 April and explained it to be the second installment in a trilogy of albums to be released by them.

=== Singles ===
The album's lead single, "Bad Habits", was released on 10 January 2016, alongside a music video directed by Ben Chapell. The video depicts Kane and Turner at a bar, where they performed the song live, interspersed with footage of them socialising and womanising.

The next three singles, the title track, "Aviation" and "Miracle Aligner" were released as a video trilogy entitled, "The Italian Saga", directed by Saam Farahmand. It has been described as "a tale of mob, love and music in stunning Italian 60s CinemaScope". Although, "Everything You've Come to Expect" was first released on 10 March 2016, it serves as the second installment of the trilogy, with "Aviation", released six days later, being the first. The first two videos were described as "an intriguing Tarantino-esque two-parter, entirely set on a deserted Californian beach". The last installment, "Miracle Aligner", was released on 28 March 2016.

=== Tours and other performances ===
In January 2016, the band announced a tour of Europe and the U.S. which began that March, In February they extended the tour into July, with dates added in the United Kingdom, Ireland, Italy, Mexico and Japan. On 24 March, they played live in Cambridge. This was the tour's opening performance and the Last Shadow Puppets first performance since 2010. In March and April 2016, the band announced dates in Germany and England, and in May they announced their U.S. tour. During the tour the Last Shadow Puppets were supported by Jeff Wootton, Yak, Cam Avery and Alexandra Savior.

The band also headlined several music festivals, including Coachella, Radio 1's Big Weekend, Primavera Sound, Rockwave, T in the Park and Lollapalooza in Chicago. In April 2016, the Last Shadow Puppets played a show at Webster Hall, while reviewing the show for Q, Georgina Newman said, "The giggles and in-jokes are merely colour, because The Last Shadow Puppets are far more interested in underlining how far they've come musically. The orchestral pop framework the band established in 2008 is now fully fleshed out, with some well-defined muscle". In June 2016, the band performed on the pyramid stage at the Glastonbury Festival. During the set, they performed a cover of "Moonage Daydream" in memory of Bowie. In July the Last Shadow Puppets played two nights at Alexandra Palace in London, on the second date, they were joined by Johnny Marr for a cover of the Smiths' "Last Night I Dreamt That Somebody Loved Me". They ended their 2016 tour on 26 August by playing at the Rock en Seine festival in Paris, France. The group were joined by touring members Davey Latter, Loren Humphrey, Tyler Parkford and string section members, Caroline Buckman, Claudia Chopek, Jennifer Takamatsu and Mikala Schmitz.

The Last Shadow Puppets made a number of television performances in promotion of Everything You've Come to Expect including on the late-night talk shows Le Grand Journal, Late Night with Seth Meyers, The Late Late Show with James Corden, and Later...with Jools Holland. In March 2016, they played an acoustic set at VOX Studios in Los Angeles, and a week later, an intimate show at Club 69 for Studio Brussel, where they played the album in full, as well as five tracks from their debut. Several live sessions were recorded for radio stations such as SiriusXM, Flux FM and BBC Radio 2. Another acoustic session was recorded for Spotify at their studios in London.

== Critical reception ==
Professional ratings
Aggregate scores
Source	Rating
AnyDecentMusic?	6.5/10
Metacritic	70/100
Review scores
Source	Rating
AllMusic	4/5 stars
The Daily Telegraph	4/5 stars
The Guardian	3/5 stars
The Independent	4/5 stars
Mojo	3/5 stars
NME	4/5
Pitchfork	5.6/10
Q	3/5 stars
Rolling Stone	3.5/5 stars
Uncut	7/10

Everything You've Come to Expect received positive reviews from contemporary music critics. At Metacritic, which assigns a normalised rating out of 100 to reviews from mainstream critics, the album received an average score of 70, based on 28 reviews, which indicates "generally favorable reviews". Aggregator AnyDecentMusic? gave it 6.5 out of 10, based on their assessment of the critical consensus.

In a positive review, The Independent noted the album's experimental nature and wrote that it "improves over time". Philip Cosores of Consequence said "the album is never tortuous or boring" and felt its quality was on par with the band members' principal works, as they all devoted themselves to the record. He also thought the album "feels necessary within the context of all their careers". For The Line of Best Fit, Ryan Lunn thought, Everything You've Come to Expect, took a departure from its previous orchestral influences, leaving the album sounding "more cinematic", further describing it as a "champagne-coated, arena-sized pop-rock album that's slick and accessibly smart". Laura Snapes, on her Pitchfork review, described the first five tracks as "totally gorgeous, the strings glassy, the tone all understated seduction, the structures fluid and surprising", adding, "It's the perfect music for the Daniel Craig-era James Bond films: sophisticated, tortured—and with a weakness for temptation". Matt Collar of AllMusic praised the bands songwriting, "they make writing catchy, literate songs sound easy", and said the lyrics were "wedded to their echo-chamber-laden arrangements and sneering Bowie-esque croons", describing Turner and Kane, as "debonair lounge lizards, [...] with talent and charisma to spare". Barry Nicholson of NME noted that Turner and Kane, were no longer as musically naive as they were in their first record, with their partnership continuing, "to provoke intriguing responses from each other". He praised Pallet's work on the album and called him "the Shadow Puppets' unsung hero". On the lyrics, Neil McCormick of The Daily Telegraph found "Bright character studies of predatory women, manipulative gurus, sleazy lotharios and outdoor sex fiends are peppered with non-sequiturs that force listeners to fill in gaps". He noted the "jokiness" of some of the lyrics confirmed the band as an escape for Turner's "more purposeful full-time band", but overall found it, "hard to fault a couple of great songwriters having an absolute ball in the studio, making pop that actually snaps and crackles".

Writing for The Guardian, Alexis Petridis, thought Everything You've Come to Expect was less musically focused than their first record, but also, "less inclined to lapse into straightforward pastiche". He wasn't that complimentary to the lyrics either, saying that "you can detect something a bit distasteful in their worldview: an arrogance and entitlement that all that clever wordplay can't quite cover". For the same publication, Emily Mackay, was even more negative, "Their second album fulfils the premise of its title with more ravishing arrangements by Owen Pallett, while leaning less on the Scott Walker/Morricone stylings that gave their 2008 debut a whiff of pastiche", although she was warmer towards Turner's lyrics, describing them as "nuanced"; she ended up the review by saying "even the best tracks —Miracle Aligner, Dracula Teeth— are just Monkeys offcuts in orchestral pop clothing".

Everything You've Come to Expect appeared on several year-end lists. Publications like Esquire and Fopp included the album in the top twenty of their year-end lists for 2016. Everything You've Come to Expect also appeared on Q 's top fifty. Other publications that listed the album on their top 100 included Rough Trade and Piccadilly Records.

== Commercial performance ==
Everything You've Come to Expect debuted at number one on the UK Albums Chart, becoming their second album to do so, and Turner's seventh consecutive album to debut at number one in the UK. In addition, with 7,300 vinyl copies sold in the first week, the album outsold the first week of another Turner penned album, AM from 2013, by over 2,000 copies. In the two months following its release, Everything You've Come to Expect was certified silver by the British Phonographic Industry, while it received gold certification well over a year later on 15 December 2017. The album debuted at number one in Belgium. It additionally reached number two in the Netherlands, top three in Ireland and the top ten in Belgium (Wallonia), France and Australia. In the US, Everything You've Come to Expect debuted at number eighty three on the Billboard 200 chart.

== Track listing ==
All tracks are written by Alex Turner and Miles Kane, except where noted.

Everything You've Come to Expect track listing
No.	Title	Lead vocals	Length
1.	"Aviation"	Kane	3:43
2.	"Miracle Aligner" (Turner, Alexandra Savior)	Turner	4:05
3.	"Dracula Teeth"	Turner with Kane	2:51
4.	"Everything You've Come to Expect"	Turner with Kane	3:13
5.	"The Element of Surprise"	Turner with Kane	2:52
6.	"Bad Habits"	Kane	3:00
7.	"Sweet Dreams, TN" (Turner)	Turner	3:56
8.	"Used to Be My Girl"	Kane and Turner	2:55
9.	"She Does the Woods"	Turner	3:30
10.	"Pattern"	Kane	4:15
11.	"The Dream Synopsis" (Turner)	Turner	3:03
Total length:			37:23

Digital edition
No.	Title	Lead vocals	Length
12.	"The Bourne Identity" (Turner)	Turner	3:05
Total length:			40:28

Digital deluxe edition (The Dream Synopsis EP)
No.	Title	Writer(s)	Length
13.	"Aviation" (The Dream Synopsis EP Version)	Turner; Kane	3:46
14.	"Les Cactus"	Jacques Dutronc; Jacques Lanzmann	3:20
15.	"Totally Wired"	Mark E. Smith; Marc Riley; Paul Hanley; Craig Scanlon	3:37
16.	"This Is Your Life"	Rob Chapman	2:55
17.	"Is This What You Wanted"	Leonard Cohen	6:46
18.	"The Dream Synopsis" (The Dream Synopsis EP Version)	Turner	3:42
Total length:			64:34

Limited edition LP – bonus 7" vinyl
No.	Title	Length
1.	"Bad Habits"	3:00
2.	"The Bourne Identity" (Turner)	3:05
Total length:		6:05

== Personnel ==
Credits adapted from album liner notes.

The Last Shadow Puppets

- Alex Turner
- Miles Kane
- James Ford
- Zachary Dawes

Additional musicians

- Matt Helders – backing vocals (tracks 4, 5, and 8)

Production

- James Ford – production
- Sean Oakley – engineering
- Ross Hogarth – orchestra recording (at United Recording Studios, CA)
- Tchad Blake – mixing
- Brian Lucey – mastering

Artwork

- Matthew Cooper – design
- Jack Robinson – cover photography
- Zackery Michael – booklet photography
- Matt Helders – booklet photography
- Ben Chappell – booklet photography
- Taylor Bagley – booklet photography

Orchestrations

- Owen Pallett – arrangement, conducting
- Eric Gorfrain – violin
- Marisa Kuney – violin
- Amy Wickman – violin
- Daphne Chen – violin
- Gina Kronstadt – violin
- Alwyn Wright – violin
- Chris Woods – violin
- Leah Katz – violin
- Rodney Wirtz – viola
- Richard Dodd – cello
- John Krovoza – cello
- Peggy Baldwin – cello
- Ian Walker – contrabass
- Chris Bautista – violin
- Stephanie O'Keefe – French horn
- Sara Andon – flute
- Nick Daley – violin

== Charts ==
=== Weekly charts ===
Chart performance for Everything You've Come to Expect
Chart (2016)	Peak position
Australian Albums (ARIA)	9
Austrian Albums (Ö3 Austria)	14
Belgian Albums (Ultratop Flanders)	1
Belgian Albums (Ultratop Wallonia)	6
Dutch Albums (Album Top 100)	2
French Albums (SNEP)	6
German Albums (Offizielle Top 100)	18
Irish Albums (IRMA)	3
Italian Albums (FIMI)	21
New Zealand Albums (RMNZ)	26
Norwegian Albums (VG-lista)	36
Portuguese Albums (AFP)	11
Scottish Albums (Official Charts)	1
Swedish Albums (Sverigetopplistan)	58
Swiss Albums (Schweizer Hitparade)	13
UK Albums (Official Charts)	1
US Billboard 200	83

=== Year-end charts ===
2016 chart performance for Everything You've Come to Expect
Chart (2016)	Position
Belgian Albums (Ultratop Flanders)	27
Belgian Albums (Ultratop Wallonia)	118
French Albums (SNEP)	180
UK Albums (OCC)	73

== Certifications ==
Certifications for Everything You've Come to Expect
Region	Certification	Certified units/sales
United Kingdom (BPI)	Gold	100,000^{‡}
^{‡} Sales+streaming figures based on certification alone.
