= The Age of the Understatement =

Studio album by the Last Shadow Puppets
- Released: 15 April 2008
- Recorded: August 2007
- Studios: Black Box, France; RAK, London (Note: Track 4); British Grove, London (Note: Orchestra)
- Genres: Symphonic pop; pop rock; baroque pop
- Length: 35:10
- Label: Domino
- Producer: James Ford

The Last Shadow Puppets chronology
The Age of the Understatement (2008)	Everything You've Come to Expect (2016)

Singles from The Age of the Understatement
- 1. "The Age of the Understatement" Released: 14 April 2008; 2. "Standing Next to Me" Released: 7 July 2008; 3. "My Mistakes Were Made for You" Released: 20 October 2008

The Age of the Understatement is the debut studio album by English supergroup the Last Shadow Puppets, released on 15 April 2008 by Domino Recording Company. It was written between band co-frontmen Alex Turner and Miles Kane in 2006. It was produced in Paris and London by fellow member James Ford, featuring orchestral arrangements composed by Owen Pallett, and performed by the London Metropolitan Orchestra. The album artwork features a 1962 black and white picture, by photographer Sam Haskins, depicting a young woman, named Gill, sitting on the floor.

The Age of the Understatement is a stylistic deviation from the indie rock sound found in Turner and Kane's previous work with the Arctic Monkeys and The Little Flames, respectively. It mainly features genres that include Symphonic pop, pop rock, and baroque pop. It also draws influence from French pop and film scores of the 1960s. The album was released to generally positive reviews. It was nominated for the 2008 Mercury Prize, and became the band's first number-one in the UK. Following its release, the album was promoted by the singles "The Age of the Understatement", "Standing Next to Me" and "My Mistakes Were Made for You", as well as a European and North American tour and multiple television appearances.

== Background and recording ==
Turner and Kane first collaborated musically on the song "505", from Arctic Monkeys' second album Favourite Worst Nightmare and on "Fluorescent Adolescent" B-sides "The Bakery" and "Plastic Tramp." At first, they had joked with the idea of forming a band, saying that it would be great to do something similar to Scott Walker's Jackie. It was during those recording sessions in 2006, when they decided to start a project together. During the mixing of the album, they wrote their first song together, "The Chamber", which was followed by "Meeting Place" and "I Don't Like you Anymore". Although they already had written some songs each, most were done collaboratively. Those songs were written during weekend breaks, between their native cities of Sheffield and Liverpool, with one playing chords while the other paced around the room scribbling on a pad. They recalled already writing songs backstage while Kane accompanied Arctic Monkeys on tour in early 2007. By April 2007, the writing process was almost finished, and they had already several demos, the process continued until July, when they spent a weekend demoing at The Rascals' rehearsal space in Liverpool.

In August 2007, the band began recording sessions at Black Box Studios in Maine-et-Loire, France. Fellow member James Ford produced the record. The album was mainly recorded over two weeks. Turner and Kane provided the vocals, and played bass and guitar in all songs, with Ford playing drums, mainly using live takes. The process was simple with just Turner, Kane, Ford and engineer Jimmy Robertson participating in the sessions. The band lived in the studio while recording, in their free time Turner and Kane would ride their bikes through the countryside, listen to old records, watch The Pink Panther film series, and have dance parties. For the instrumental arrangements, the band first contacted Nico Muhly, but he passed, and recommended friend Owen Pallett instead. Pallett was contacted by Laurence Bell, head of Domino, who asked him to meet Turner in Toronto. Pallet said of that time, "We took a cab to my southern Toronto prison and we listened to some David Axelrod records and talked about music. I listened to the tracks he'd recorded, and told him my ideas." The band was very specific in how the strings should sound, with Turner saying, "We wanted it to be more soundtrack and widescreen than, like, Nick Drake, who has more of a foresty, autumnal sound when using strings." Pallett tried to "flesh [the ideas] all out," and described it as "the most effortless project I've ever worked on." By November he was working on the score which took him a "couple of weeks," and recorded his parts at Arcade Fire's studio in Canada. He flew to London in December to conduct, and record, the 22-piece London Metropolitan Orchestra, at British Grove Studios. Track "Separate and Ever Deadly", was written after the sessions in France. Originally thought of as a B-side, it replaced another song, and was later recorded at RAK Studios in London. Mixing took place in January 2008. During the recording of the album Turner and Kane hired a documentary film-making team, Luke Seomore and Joseph Bull, to capture the story of the project. The first people to hear the album outside the band, were the rest of the members from Arctic Monkeys, Turner was nervous at first, and described the situation as if a partner had discovered an "affair tape," nevertheless, the band loved the album, specifically the opening track.

== Composition ==
=== Musical style and influences ===
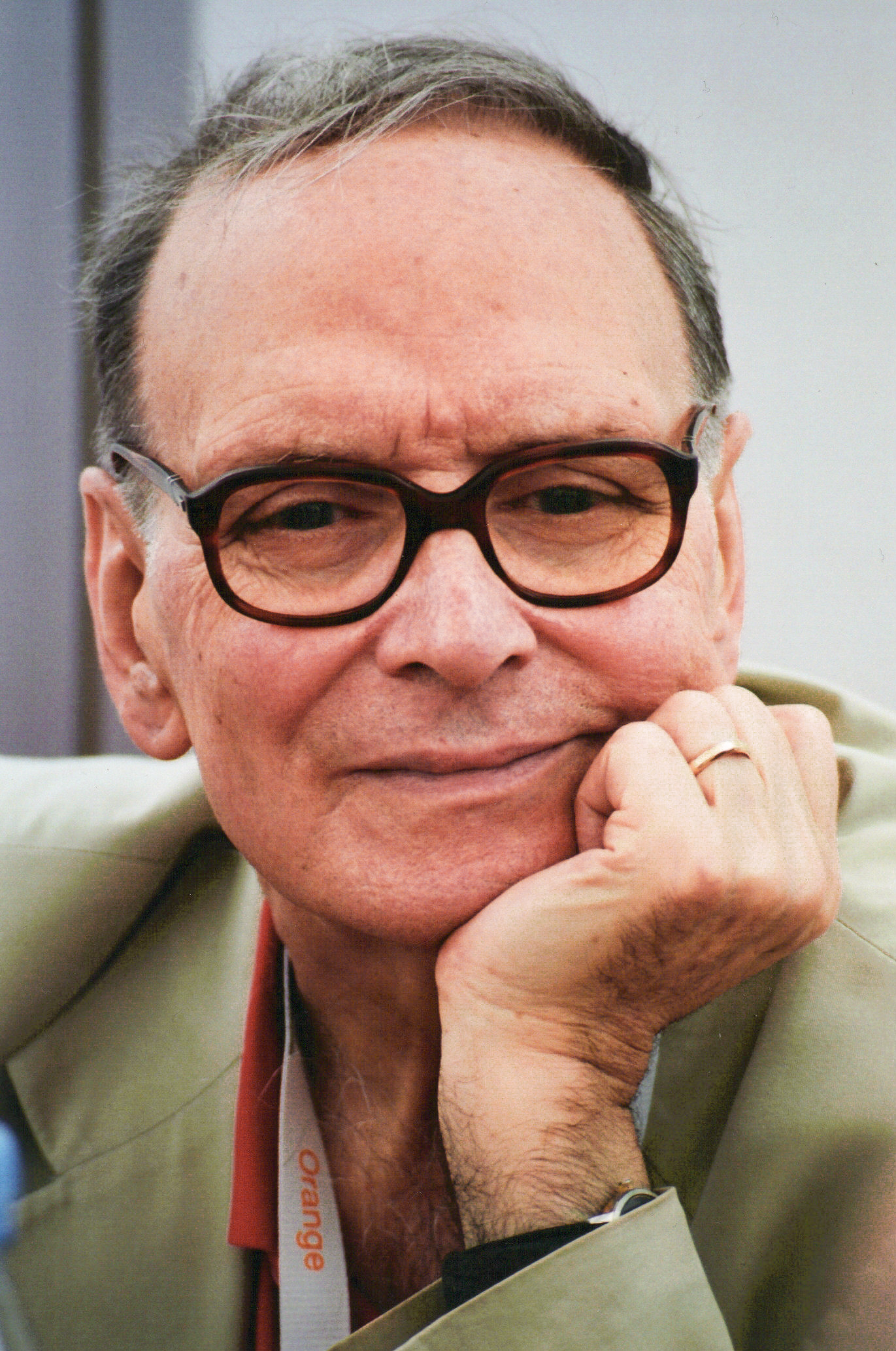
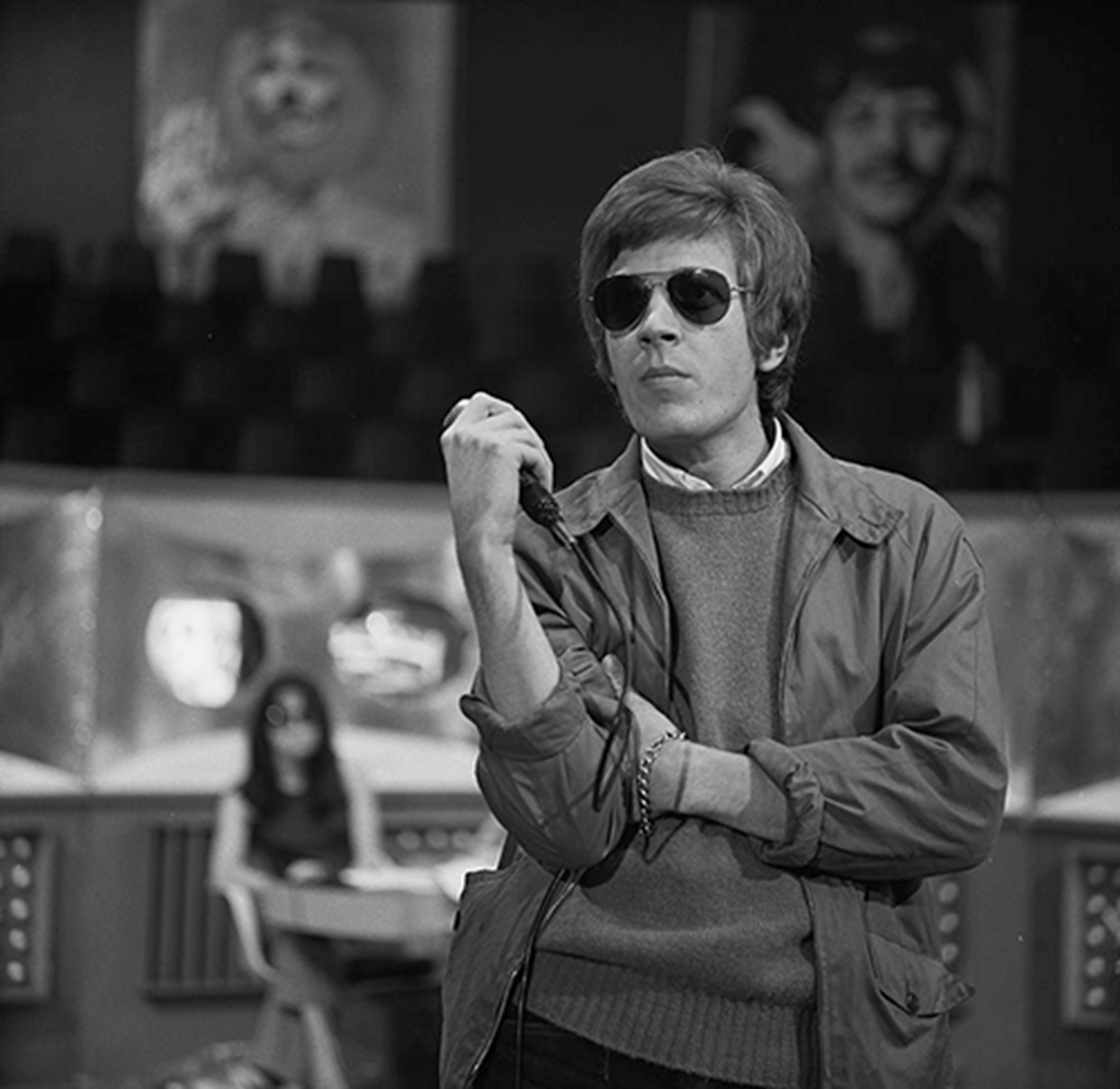
Several music critics cited Ennio Morricone (left) and Scott Walker (right) as having influenced the album's style.

The album was described as being "mid-sixties, pre-psychedelic, epic pop music with period reverb settings, Hammond organs, tremolo guitars, mariachi drum beats, horn sections, rapid strum acoustic guitars, and tasteful orchestral touches." It has been characterised as symphonic pop, pop rock, and baroque pop.

The album has been compared to the works of John Barry, Ennio Morricone, the Zombies, Love, Scott Walker, Burt Bacharach, and the James Bond soundtracks, as well as contemporary artists like Pulp and Belle and Sebastian. The duo claimed the album was influenced by the music of Walker, Serge Gainsbourg's Histoire de Melody Nelson, The Electric Prunes' Mass in F Minor, and Morricone's The Good, the Bad and the Ugly soundtrack.

== Album art and title ==
The album art consists of a photo of Gill, an art student from Johannesburg, photographed by Sam Haskins in 1962. The photograph was chosen by Alex Turner, after he saw it in a copy of Haskins' book found by Alexa Chung, his girlfriend at the time, in Dover Street Market. Chung, also owned a print of the same image, which she hung in her New York apartment. The band joked that their first idea for the artwork, was to feature both of them in white polo necks, with a burning cigarette on top of a piano.

At first, the band thought of calling the album Shadows, which later would become the band name. In the end, the band landed on The Age of the Understatement. Turner said the title "It's a bit sarcastic because, it's quite a big statement," adding "We're in this age where people don't do this kind of thing, or don't do it well."

== Release and promotion ==
On 20 February 2008, Miles Kane and Alex Turner revealed they would be known as the Last Shadow Puppets and that their album would be titled The Age of the Understatement and would be released on 21 April 2008. They wanted to release it at the end of 2007 but it wasn't possible. The band played their first ever show in Brooklyn, New York, at Sound Fix Records on 4 March 2008, playing a second gig at the Lower East Side's Cake Shop the following night. Their first show in the United Kingdom was a short two song set on 5 April at the Lock Tavern in Camden, London, where they played "Meeting Place" and "Standing Next to Me".

=== Singles and videos ===
The first single, "The Age of the Understatement", was released the week before on 14 April, with new song "Two Hearts in Two Weeks" and covers of Billy Fury's "Wondrous Place" and David Bowie's "In the Heat of the Morning" —a song previously mentioned by Turner as a favourite— as b-sides. An accompanying music video directed by Romain Gavras, was released three days before. The video was shot mainly in Moscow, Russia, and features the band walking down the city, tanks, a girl ice skating, an Orthodox church, and a military choir. Gavras would later describe the shoot as "crazy" saying: "On the other side of the camera, it was a training camp with tanks shooting all the time, totally unsafe."

Their second single, "Standing Next to Me", was released on 7 July 2008. On 15 July a music video directed by Richard Ayoade was released. The video, shot in London, featured the band performing the song in what resembles to be a television studio accompanied by a group of dancers wearing colored leggings. Their third and last single, "My Mistakes Were Made for You", was released on 20 October 2008, and it included live covers of Nancy Sinatra and Lee Hazlewood's "Paris Summer", featuring Alison Mosshart, and Burt Bacharach's "My Little Red Book" as b-sides. The corresponding music video, released a month earlier, was shot at Pinewood Studios and also directed by Ayoade. The music video shows Turner on a crashed car with Alexa Chung, his then girlfriend. Kane appears later. The video was inspired by Federico Fellini's cult film Toby Dammit (1968).

=== Tour and other performances ===
In June 2008, the band announced their debut world tour, which would start on 19 August of that year. The Puppets and a 16-piece orchestra, played their first tour shows at Portsmouth Guildhall and New Theatre Oxford, before attending Reading and Leeds Festivals 2008. Kane said the two festival stops would be "our [the band] first proper gigs". Their Leeds set was described by The Guardian as "a classy offering from the Puppets. But, maybe, that isn't what's needed at a festival on a Friday night". The first leg of the tour ended with a show at The Olympia in Paris on 26 August. The tour restarted in October at Cirkus in Stockholm, and continued in continental Europe, throughout the rest of the month. Their London and Sheffield shows were generally well received by both fans and critics. The band played their last show at the Mayan Theater of Los Angeles on 3 November 2008.

The band performed on a number of television shows including Later with Jools Holland, Friday Night with Jonathan Ross, and Canal +'s Concert Privé. On May, they played a four-song setlist for NPR's World Cafe. A month later, the Puppets played a secret set at Glastonbury with Arctic Monkeys' Matt Helders playing drums on "The Age of the Understatement" and Jack White playing a guitar solo on "Wondrous Place." On July, the band appeared on BBC Radio 1's Live Lounge, as mystery guests to honor host Jo Whiley's birthday. They performed "Standing Next to Me" and a cover of Rihanna's "SOS", with Turner rejecting to gender flip the lyrics of the latter, maintaining the original pronouns. On September, they performed at the 2008 Mercury Prize Awards, and a month later played a show at Philharmonic Hall, Liverpool as part of the Electric Proms.

== Reception ==
Professional ratings
Aggregate scores
Source	Rating
Metacritic	77/100
Review scores
Source	Rating
AllMusic	4/5 stars
Entertainment Weekly	B+
The Guardian	3/5 stars
Mojo	4/5 stars
NME	8/10
Pitchfork	7.7/10
Q	3/5 stars
Rolling Stone	3/5 stars
Spin	3.5/5 stars
Uncut	4/5 stars

The Age of the Understatement received largely positive reviews from contemporary music critics. At Metacritic, which assigns a normalized rating out of 100 to reviews from mainstream critics, the album received an average score of 77, based on 25 reviews, which indicates "generally favorable reviews".

Marc Hogan of Pitchfork gave the album a favorable review, stating, "The biggest difference between The Last Shadow Puppets and Turner's main gig is in the lyrics. Though less immediately noticeable than the majestic production, the change in the scale of Turner's songwriting is ultimately more profound." Hogan continues, calling the album "Turner's most impressive album-length statement yet, one that strives, musically and lyrically, for the epic grandeur of an era before GarageBand or MySpace, and avoids lapsing into pretentiousness by dint of its own headlong enthusiasm." On the difference between Turner's projects, Mikael Wood of Spin thought the album replaced "the Arctic Monkeys’ circa-now cynicism with old-school romance". Austin Powell of The Austin Chronicle praised Pallett's work saying he "deserves equal billing for his album arrangements, which lend The Age of Understatement its epic splendor." On another favorable review, Alex Denney of Drowned In Sound said the album represented, "The most ambitious music either musician has assailed" and added "The Age Of The Understatement is as solid an idea in execution as it is in concept; a record unafraid to reach beyond its obvious limitations and produce a swashbuckling end result that might even broaden a few horizons for fans and players alike." Nevertheless, he thought the record was "exaggerating the pomp and rigour of its forebears whilst falling inevitably short of their technical eloquence." Rolling Stone echoed this sentiment, describing the record as a "shameless nostalgia trip" even though it was a "compelling" one.

For The Guardian, Sam Wolfson found the record to be an intimate one, "despite the grandness of the music", and highlighted Turner and Kane's vocal performances. For the same publication, Alexis Petridis was less complimentary, pointing out that some tracks ambled down a "drearily well-trodden path" while also praising Turner's lyrics, noting his usual "witty-but-prosaic" writing, turned into something more opaque, but without "sacrificing sharpness". Bud Scoppa of Paste noted that the album would not got over that well with Arctic Monkeys fans, but praised Turner, "for unleashing his inner Bowie and embracing artifice with such nerve and verve."

== Commercial performance ==
The Age of the Understatement debuted at number one on the UK Albums Charts, where it sold 51,186 copies in the first week. In April 2016, the record was certified Platinum by the British Phonographic Industry. As of February 2022 the album has sold 337,243 copies in the UK. In the United States, the album debuted at number 111, on the Billboard 200 chart, and number nine on Billboard Independent Albums. It has sold 51,000 copies in the US as of March 2016.

== Track listing ==
All lyrics are written by Alex Turner and Miles Kane.

No.	Title	Lead vocals	Length
1.	"The Age of the Understatement"	Kane and Turner	3:07
2.	"Standing Next to Me"	Kane with Turner	2:18
3.	"Calm Like You"	Turner	2:26
4.	"Separate and Ever Deadly"	Kane and Turner	2:38
5.	"The Chamber"	Kane and Turner	2:37
6.	"Only the Truth"	Kane and Turner	2:44
7.	"My Mistakes Were Made for You"	Turner	3:04
8.	"Black Plant"	Turner with Kane	3:59
9.	"I Don't Like You Anymore"	Kane and Turner	3:05
10.	"In My Room"	Kane and Turner	2:29
11.	"Meeting Place"	Kane and Turner	3:55
12.	"Time Has Come Again"	Turner	2:22
Total length:			35:10

Different versions of the album list the last two tracks in a different manner. Catalog number WIGCD208 lists track No. 11 and No. 12 as "The Meeting Place" and "Time Has Come Again" respectively while catalog number WIGCD208S lists them as "Meeting Place" and "The Time Has Come Again".

== Personnel ==
The Last Shadow Puppets

- Alex Turner
- Miles Kane
- James Ford

Production

- James Ford – production, mixing
- Jimmy Robertson – engineering
- Steve McGlaughlin – orchestra recording
- Richard Woodcraft – mixing

Orchestrations

- Owen Pallett – arrangement and conducting
- London Metropolitan Orchestra – performance

Artwork

- Sam Haskins – front cover photography
- Deidre O' Callahan – portrait photography
- Matthew Cooper – design
- Jason Evans – design assistance ("with thanks")

== Charts ==
=== Weekly charts ===
Chart performance for The Age of the Understatement
Chart (2008)	Peak position
Australian Albums (ARIA)	30
Belgian Albums (Ultratop Flanders)	4
Belgian Albums (Ultratop Wallonia)	39
Danish Albums (Hitlisten)	23
Dutch Albums (Album Top 100)	12
French Albums (SNEP)	18
German Albums (Offizielle Top 100)	42
Italian Albums (FIMI)	56
Norwegian Albums (VG-lista)	23
Scottish Albums (Official Charts)	1
Spanish Albums (Promusicae)	66
Swedish Albums (Sverigetopplistan)	34
UK Albums (Official Charts)	1
US Billboard 200	111
US Heatseekers Albums (Billboard)	1
US Independent Albums (Billboard)	9
US Indie Store Album Sales (Billboard)	16

=== Year-end charts ===
2008 Chart performance for The Age of the Understatement
Chart (2008)	Position
Belgian Albums (Ultratop Flanders)	62
French Albums (SNEP)	102
UK Albums (OCC)	70

== Certifications ==
Certifications for The Age of the Understatement
Region	Certification	Certified units/sales
United Kingdom (BPI)	Platinum	300,000

== Release history ==
Region	Date	Label	Format	Catalog
Japan	15 April 2008	Hostess	CD	HSE-10065
Germany	18 April 2008	Domino Records	CD	
United Kingdom	21 April 2008	Domino Records	CD	WIGCD2008
United Kingdom	21 April 2008	Domino Records	LP	WIGLP208
Australia	21 April 2008	EMI Music Australia	CD	
Europe	25 April 2008		CD	WIGCD208
United States	6 May 2008	Domino Records	CD	CDNO181
Brazil	25 August 2008	EMI Music Brazil	CD	
