= Zavoli =

Zavoli is an Italian surname. Notable people with the surname include:

- Danilo Zavoli (born 1973), Sammarinese swimmer
- Mimma Zavoli (born 1963), Sammarinese politician
- Sergio Zavoli (1923–2020), Italian politician and journalist

== See also ==
- Davoli (surname)
