= Jack Carty =

Jack Carty may refer to:

- Jack Carty (cricketer), Irish cricketer
- Jack Carty (musician) (born 1987), Australian musician
- Jack Carty (rugby union) (born 1992), rugby union player from Ireland

== See also ==
- John Carty (disambiguation)
