= John Carty =

John Carty may refer to:

- John Carty (Irish politician) (1950–2014), Irish Fianna Fáil politician
- John Carty (musician), Irish traditional musician
- John J. Carty (1861–1932), American electrical engineer
- John Carty (Ontario politician), Canadian politician

== See also ==
- Jack Carty (disambiguation)
