= Taylor Bagley =

American model and actress

- Born: Taylor Elise Bagley; September 9, 1987 (age 39); Oklahoma, U.S.
- Occupations: Model; actress
- Years active: 2009–present

Taylor Elise Bagley (born September 9, 1987) is an American model and actress.

== Early life ==
Bagley was born on September 9, 1987, in Oklahoma to Robert and Donna. She has one older sister. She spent part of her childhood in Broken Arrow, Oklahoma and attended Centennial High School in Franklin, Tennessee. Although she was born in Oklahoma and spent her early years there, Bagley considers herself a native of Nashville, Tennessee.

== Career ==
Bagley is signed to the Wilhelmina Models agency in London. She is also signed to Ford Models (New York) and Vision Los Angeles. She has appeared in editorials for Vogue Italia. In 2013, she appeared as the angel in La Passione, James Franco's short film for Gucci. In 2014, she made a small appearance in her then-boyfriend Zach Braff's movie Wish I Was Here as a cosplayer. In 2015, she participated in Interpol's music video "Everything is Wrong".

== Personal life ==
Bagley was in a relationship with actor and director Zach Braff from 2009 to 2014.

She was in a relationship with Alex Turner, frontman of the rock band Arctic Monkeys, from 2015 to early 2018. The song "Sweet Dreams, TN" by Turner's side project the Last Shadow Puppets was written for and about her.
