= Saam Farahmand =

British film and music video director (born 1979)

- Born: 1979 (age 46–47); Finchley, London, United Kingdom

Saam Farahmand (born 1979) is a British film and music video director. A Fine Arts graduate of Goldsmiths, he is considered, "one of the most talented music video directors of his generation" according to the Guardian.

== Biography ==
Farahmand was born in 1979 to Iranian parents in Finchley, London, United Kingdom.

== Videography ==
Music videos

- Electric Six – "Gay Bar" (2003)
- Klaxons – "Gravity's Rainbow", "Magick", & "Golden Skans" (2006)
- Klaxons – "Gravity's Rainbow" (new version) & "It's Not Over Yet" (2007)
- Hercules and Love Affair – "Blind" (2008)
- Janet Jackson – "Feedback" & "Rock with U" (2008)
- Late of the Pier – "The Bears Are Coming" (2008)
- These New Puritans – "Elvis" (2008)
- Cheryl Cole ft. will.i.am – "3 Words" version 2 (2009)
- Simian Mobile Disco – "Cruel Intentions" (2009)
- The xx – "Islands" (2009)
- Klaxons – "Twin Flames" & "Echoes" (2010)
- Mark Ronson & The Business Intl. – "Somebody to Love Me" (2010)
- Soulwax – "Machine" The film was previsualised, edited and post produced by Andrew Daffy's The House of Curves in London.(2012)
- Tom Vek – "Aroused" (2011)
- Viktoria Modesta – "Prototype" (2014)
- The Last Shadow Puppets – "Everything You've Come to Expect" (2016)
- The Last Shadow Puppets – "Aviation" (2016)
- The Last Shadow Puppets – "Miracle Aligner" (2016)
- Mick Jagger - "Gotta Get A Grip" (2017)
- Ellie Goulding & Juice Wrld - Hate Me (2019)
- Ashnikko - You Make Me Sick (2023)

Rockumentaries

- Part of the Weekend Never Dies (2008)

== See also ==
- Anonymous Content
