= Miracle Aligner =

Single by The Last Shadow Puppets

from the album Everything You've Come to Expect
- Released: 28 March 2016
- Genre: Baroque pop; soul-pop; sophisti-pop
- Length: 4:05
- Label: Domino
- Songwriters: Alex Turner; Alexandra Savior
- Producer: James Ford

The Last Shadow Puppets singles chronology
"Aviation" (2016)	"Miracle Aligner" (2016)

Music video
- "Miracle Aligner" on YouTube

"Miracle Aligner" is a song by English baroque pop band The Last Shadow Puppets released on 28 March 2016, through Domino Recording Company. The song was included on their second studio album, Everything You've Come to Expect (2016). Written by frontman Alex Turner, singer-songwriter Alexandra Savior, and produced by James Ford, "Miracle Aligner" is a baroque pop, soul-pop, and sophisti-pop track. Savior described the song as being "obviously about a coke dealer."

The accompanying music video was directed by Saam Farahmand, and shot at Hotel Café Royal in London. The video is the last part of a trilogy entitled, "The Italian Saga", and features Turner and Kane in an empty ornate room, dancing in a choreographed manner, while being observed by a film crew. It was released on 15 May 2016, and is the band's most popular video. The Last Shadow Puppets performed the song on television shows such as Le Grand Journal and The Late Late Show with James Corden.

== Background and release ==
Turner had the idea for the song and a few chords, he shared them with Kane, who responded "positively." He said the beginnings of the song were "really old," and that the idea "had always been around" and "came back in the end." When writing for Alexandra Savior's debut record she and Turner completed the lyrics. They didn't feel it fit on her record, so Turner brought it back to Kane and "ended up being under the Shadow Puppets umbrella." On rejecting it, Savior said the song is "obviously about a coke dealer - it's a lifestyle that I didn't relate to myself." In another interview she added, "It always felt like it was more Alex's song though. He was totally in love with the song. [...] I'm just happy that the song saw the light of day. It's great to be involved in music that's so well received." The song was premiered on Zane Lowe's Beats 1 Radio show, where Zane named it his "World Record" for March 28, 2016. The duo jokingly claimed the song was inspired by a "yoga teacher" and a "make-believe wrestler."

== Composition ==
Musically, "Miracle Aligner" has been described as "honeyed soul-pop" and "sophisti-pop". On this song, it has been said the album is at its most "lush" and "seductive." The song has a "breezy melody." Instrumentally, it makes use of "tremolo-heavy guitars." The chorus has been said to be reminiscent of Turner's work with Arctic Monkeys.

== Music video ==
The music video for "Miracle Aligner" is the last part of a trilogy entitled, "The Italian Saga", directed by Saam Farahmand. It has been described as "A tale of Italian organized crime, love and music in stunning Italian 60s cinemascope". It was shot at Hotel Café Royal in London, and first released onto YouTube on 17 May 2016.

The video begins with Kane and Turner standing in a balcony while rose petals fall from the sky. A dialogue, dubbed in Italian, occurs between the two, where Kane asks "What's this?", to which Turner responds "This...This is an attempt to extract truth...approximately." In the next shot, now inside an empty ornate room, Turner and Kane stand in front of each other, wearing cream coloured suits and looking extremely tanned, an allusion to the events shown in the Aviation and Everything You've Come to Expect music videos. Turner and Kane start dancing across the room. A circular dolly shot reveals they are being observed by a film crew. They keep dancing in a choreographed manner while looking into the camera. The video ends with the film crew leaving while Kane and Turner, now looking at each other, keep dancing. Turner kneels on the ground, Kane embraces him, and both collapse on top of each other.

== Personnel ==
The Last Shadow Puppets

- Alex Turner – vocals, guitar, percussion
- Miles Kane – vocals
- James Ford – drums, percussion, keys
- Zach Dawes – bass guitar

String section

- Leah Katz, Rodney Wirtz – viola
- Richard Dodd, John Krovoza, Peggy Baldwin – cello
- Eric Gorfain, Marisa Kuney, Amy Wickman, Daphne Chen, Gina Kronstadt, Alwyn Wright, Chris Woods – violin
- Ian Walker – contrabass
- Sara Andon – flute

Additional personnel

- Owen Pallett – strings arrangement

== Charts ==
Chart (2016)	Peak position
Belgium (Ultratip Bubbling Under Flanders)	23
Belgium (Ultratip Bubbling Under Wallonia)	40
France (SNEP)	199
UK Singles (Official Charts Company)	180

== Certifications ==
Region	Certification	Certified units/sales
United Kingdom (BPI)	Silver	200,000^{‡}
^{‡} Sales+streaming figures based on certification alone.
