= 505 (song) =

2007 song by Arctic Monkeys

Song by Arctic Monkeys

from the album Favourite Worst Nightmare
- Released: 23 April 2007
- Genre: Alternative rock; post-punk revival; dream pop
- Length: 4:14
- Label: Domino
- Composers: Jamie Cook; Matt Helders; Nick O'Malley; Alex Turner
- Lyricist: Alex Turner
- Producers: James Ford; Mike Crossey

"505 (Live)"

Promotional single by Arctic Monkeys

from the album Live at the Royal Albert Hall
- Released: 19 November 2020
- Recorded: 7 June 2018
- Venue: Royal Albert Hall
- Length: 4:35
- Label: Domino
- Composers: Jamie Cook; Matt Helders; Nick O'Malley; Alex Turner
- Lyricist: Alex Turner

"505" is a song by English rock band Arctic Monkeys. Written by lead singer and frontman Alex Turner and produced by James Ford and Mike Crossey, it is the closing track on the band's second studio album, Favourite Worst Nightmare (2007).

The song was a sleeper hit, initially peaking at number 74 on the UK Singles Chart in 2007. In late 2022, it gained a resurgence in popularity due to usage on the social media platform TikTok. As a result, "505" peaked at number two on the Billboard Bubbling Under Hot 100 and number 94 on the Billboard Global 200. It is the band's third-most streamed song on Spotify, behind "Do I Wanna Know?" and "I Wanna Be Yours" (both from their 2013 album AM), with 2.6 billion streams as of February 2026.

A live version was released on 19 November 2020 as a promotional single for the band's second live album, Live at the Royal Albert Hall (2020).

== Release and promotion ==
"505" was released on 23 April 2007 as the closing track from Arctic Monkeys' second studio album Favourite Worst Nightmare (2007). The song became a frequent closer of the band's live shows since 2007. It has been performed several times with Miles Kane, including during Arctic Monkeys' headline set at TRNSMT in 2018 and the last night of the band's three-days residency at the Emirates Stadium in London in June 2023. Turner and Kane also performed the song as The Last Shadow Puppets during their 2016 headline Rockwave Festival set.

On 19 November 2020, the band released a live version of "505" ahead of their second live album Live at the Royal Albert Hall. It was recorded on 7 June 2018 at the Royal Albert Hall in London. All of the proceeds from that project were donated to War Child.

A fan favourite, "505" became popular on TikTok in August 2022 when it was associated to a variety of videos, including some by users showcasing the soft grunge, 2014 Tumblr aesthetic. Following that viral success, the song surged on Spotify where it became the band's third most popular song with an average of 1.7 million plays a month. It reached a new peak in the UK Singles Chart and was number 64 on the 2022 annual chart. It was also the biggest indie song in the UK in 2022.

== Composition ==
The track features Alex Turner playing Hammond organ, as well as a guitar played by long-time collaborator Miles Kane. In the studio recording Matt Helders plays variations of Motorik beat on the drums at 140 BPM.

The song's lyrics prominently focus on a relationship, and the protagonist yearningly returning to a place for a certain moment or individual, "505" is ambiguous in its meaning, but some have suggested it could represent a real or metaphorical hotel room number. The track is often referred to as one of the first love songs by the band, with Turner stating in an interview with NME, "the first proper love song we've done ... as in like, 'Oh, it's that one person'". Fans have theorised that the lyrics refer to Turner's then-girlfriend, Johanna Bennett.

== Personnel ==
Arctic Monkeys

- Alex Turner – vocals, Hammond organ
- Jamie Cook – guitar
- Nick O'Malley – bass guitar
- Matt Helders – drums

Additional performers

- Miles Kane – additional guitar
- James Ford – tambourine

Technical personnel

- Mike Crossey – production
- James Ford – production
- Alan Moulder – mixing
- George Marino – mastering

== Reception ==
"505" received mainly positive reviews from critics. Marc Hogan of Pitchfork referred to it as "one of Turner's first proper love songs" stating further, "the closing '505', [sic] draped with an apparent Ennio Morricone organ sample, poignantly if none too adventurously describes Turner's longing to get back to a hotel room where his lover awaits".

In an article revisiting the track, Harry Fortuna of The Edge praises Turner's maturity in the song's lyrics, commenting "lyrically, Turner is at his poetic best, as he makes his pilgrimage back to his awaiting lover in hotel room 505, he displays his tendency for the explicit as he croons over the lines 'I'm always just about to go and spoil the surprise / Take my hands off of your eyes too soon'". "The song is way before its time", he further states, "evoking a romanticism and air of class that can be seen in much larger volumes in 2013's AM, contrasted with the rustic authenticity that harks back to the band's roots that are grounded in the nightclubs of Sheffield. '505' epitomises everything about the band".

Alexis Petridis of The Guardian states the track "discusses how touring plays havoc with one's love life ... It's so heartfelt and riven with insecurity that it transcends the dreary genre to which it should by rights belong, that of songs in which rock stars complain about being rock stars. That stuff this mature and thoughtful was written by someone barely 21 years old genuinely gives you pause for thought". In another article ranking all the band's songs, Petridis ranks "505" at number three, stating "the belated progress of 505 from overlooked album track to one of Arctic Monkeys' biggest songs... is fascinating. TikTok clearly played a role, but so did the sheer quality of the song: over chords borrowed from Ennio Morricone, it deals in beautifully understated melancholy".

In 2023, Rolling Stone and Paste ranked the song number five and number six, respectively, on their lists of the greatest Arctic Monkeys songs. The song was voted number four on the 2023 edition of Radio X's annual "Best British Song of All Time" poll.

== Cover versions ==
American singer Nessa Barrett released a dream pop cover of "505" as part of the extended version of her debut album Young Forever. The first verse of Dua Lipa's "Hotter than Hell", references the song where Lipa sings "you probably still adore me with my hands around your neck."

British singer Louis Tomlinson covered "505" during the opening night of his sophomore tour "Faith in the Future" at the Mohegan Sun Arena in Uncasville, Connecticut on 26 May 2023. He continued to cover the song at every show of his world tour.

== Charts ==
=== Weekly charts ===
Weekly chart performance for "505"
Chart (2007)	Peak position
UK Singles (Official Charts)	74

Weekly chart performance for "505"
Chart (2020–2026)	Peak position
Global 200 (Billboard)	94
Greece (IFPI)	19
Ireland (IRMA)	55
Portugal (AFP)	153
UK Singles (Official Charts)	73
UK Indie (Official Charts)	2
US Bubbling Under Hot 100 (Billboard)	2
US Hot Rock & Alternative Songs (Billboard)	12

Chart performance for "505 (Live)"
Chart (2020)	Peak position
Belgium (Ultratip Bubbling Under Flanders)	38
Portugal (AFP)	155

=== Year-end charts ===
2023 year-end chart performance for "505"
Chart (2023)	Position
UK Singles (OCC)	82
US Hot Rock & Alternative Songs (Billboard)	25

2025 year-end chart performance for "505"
Chart (2025)	Position
Global 200 (Billboard)	91

== Certifications ==
Certifications for "505"
Region	Certification	Certified units/sales
Denmark (IFPI Danmark)	Platinum	90,000^{‡}
Italy (FIMI)	Platinum	100,000^{‡}
New Zealand (RMNZ)	4× Platinum	120,000^{‡}
Portugal (AFP)	Gold	12,000^{‡}
Spain (Promusicae)	Gold	30,000^{‡}
United Kingdom (BPI)	4× Platinum	2,400,000^{‡}
Streaming
Greece (IFPI Greece)	4× Platinum	8,000,000^{†}
^{‡} Sales+streaming figures based on certification alone.^{†} Streaming-only figures based on certification alone.
