= Davoli (surname) =

Davoli is a surname. Notable people with the surname include:

- Angelo Davoli (1896–1978), Italian middle-distance runner
- Bob Davoli, American venture capitalist
- Daniela Davoli (born 1957), Italian pop singer-songwriter
- Matilde Davoli (born 1982), Italian indie-pop songwriter, producer and sound engineer
- Ninetto Davoli (born 1948), Italian actor
