= Standing Next to Me =

Single by The Last Shadow Puppets

from the album The Age of the Understatement
- Released: 7 July 2008
- Recorded: 2007
- Label: Domino
- Songwriters: Alex Turner; Miles Kane
- Producer: James Ford

The Last Shadow Puppets singles chronology
"The Age of the Understatement" (2008)	"Standing Next to Me" (2008)	"My Mistakes Were Made for You" (2008)

Alternative cover

"Standing Next to Me" is a song by English baroque pop band The Last Shadow Puppets. It was released on 7 July 2008 in the United Kingdom by Domino Recording Company as the second single of their debut album The Age of the Understatement. Written by co-frontmen Alex Turner and Miles Kane, the song was produced by James Ford, and recorded at Black Box studios in France in the summer of 2007. The lyrics describe a love triangle between the narrator, a woman, and another man.

Upon release, the song reached number 30 on the UK Singles Chart on 13 July 2008.

== Background ==
The song started during the Arctic Monkeys 2005 U.K. tour, where Kane's band The Little Flames acted as support. Kane played a rough version of the track to Turner in their dressing room, which he had a positive reaction to.

== Music video ==
On 15 July a music video directed by Richard Ayoade was released. The video, shot in London, featured Turner on tambourine and Kane on guitar performing the song with shadowing in what resembles a television studio accompanied by a group of dancers in matching striped dresses, but differently coloured leggings.

== Live performances ==
Before the album release, the song was first played live at The Last Shadow Puppets' first ever concert, at Sound Fix Records, Brooklyn on 4 March 2008. The band performed the song throughout 2008 on "The Age of the Understatement Tour" where it would often be played as the show closer. Standing Next to Me, was subsequently performed during the band hiatus in 2010, when they played an acoustic set at Club Nokia in Los Angeles, for Brian O'Connor's benefit concert. This marked the first live performance of the band since 2008. On 3 February 2012, Miles Kane supported Arctic Monkeys at their Paris Olympia show. At the conclusion of the support slot, Turner joined Kane to perform the song. This was repeated again a year later, at Kane's Glastonbury set, near the end of his performance. At Finsbury Park 2014, both reunited once more for an acoustic performance. The song was brought back again in 2016 during the "Everything You've Come to Expect Tour," once again serving as the show closer. The song is often performed similarly to the music video, with Turner playing tambourine and Kane an acoustic guitar, singing at their respective microphones. During the instrumental break, one of them will move towards the other and sing together, sharing one mic, for the remainder of the song. This was done for the first time in 2008 at their concert in Tempodrom Berlin and has become a staple ever since.

== Critical reception ==
Professional ratings
Review scores
Source	Rating
The Skinny	4/5 stars

For The Skinny, the song is "another testament to the songwriting prowess of Turner and [...] Miles Kane", describing it as, "finely crafted retro pop, but there are certain flourishes present that allude to new territories."

== Track listing ==
All lyrics are written by Alex Turner and Miles Kane; all music is composed by The Last Shadow Puppets.

CD RUG301CD
No.	Title	Length
1.	"Standing Next to Me"	2:18
2.	"Hang the Cyst"	6:40
3.	"Gas Dance"	3:37

7" RUG301
No.	Title	Length
1.	"Standing Next to Me"	2:18
2.	"Gas Dance"	3:37

7" RUG301X
No.	Title	Length
1.	"Standing Next to Me"	2:18
2.	"Sequels"	3:42

== Charts ==
Chart (2008)	Peak position
UK Singles Chart	30
Spanish Singles Chart	13
French Singles Chart	64
