= The Age of the Understatement (song) =

Single by The Last Shadow Puppets

from the album The Age of the Understatement
- Released: 15 April 2008
- Recorded: August 2007 – December 2007
- Genre: Indie rock, country rock, alternative country, symphonic rock
- Label: Domino
- Songwriters: Alex Turner, Miles Kane
- Producer: James Ford

The Last Shadow Puppets singles chronology
"The Age of the Understatement" (2008)	"Standing Next to Me" (2008)

Music video
- "The Age of the Understatement" Video on YouTube

Alternative cover

The Age of the Understatement track listing
- 1. "The Age of the Understatement"; 2. "Standing Next to Me"; 3. "Calm Like You"; 4. "Separate and Ever Deadly"; 5. "The Chamber"; 6. "Only the Truth"; 7. "My Mistakes Were Made for You"; 8. "Black Plant"; 9. "I Don't Like You Anymore"; 10. "In My Room"; 11. "The Meeting Place"; 12. "Time Has Come Again"

"The Age of the Understatement" is the first single released by The Last Shadow Puppets. It was released on 14 April 2008 in the United Kingdom on Domino Records. The song is the title track from the band's debut album The Age of the Understatement.

== Music video ==
The video was shot in Moscow, Russia, by French director Romain Gavras, and features Turner and Kane walking through the Russian capital. Gavras chose to shoot in Russia, as the song had "a western feel to it," and "Russia is kind of like the new Wild West." He described it as, "The most difficult shot, I've ever done." due to the long hours, the cold temperatures, and the fact they had, "to bribe a few people - including the police, who were with us all the time when we were filming." Gavras later described the shoot as "crazy" saying: "On the other side of the camera, it was a training camp with tanks shooting all the time, totally unsafe." The video won Best Cinematography at the 2008 UK Music Video Awards, and was featured on Pitchfork's Top 40 Music Videos of 2008 list.

== Track listing ==
All lyrics are written by Alex Turner and Miles Kane, except where noted; all music is composed by The Last Shadow Puppets.

CD RUG288CD
No.	Title	Length
1.	"The Age of the Understatement"	3:07
2.	"Two Hearts in Two Weeks"	2:16
3.	"Wondrous Place" (Lewis/Giant)	2:46

7" RUG288
No.	Title	Length
1.	"The Age of the Understatement"	3:07
2.	"Two Hearts in Two Weeks"	2:16

7" RUG288X
No.	Title	Length
1.	"The Age of the Understatement"	3:07
2.	"In the Heat of the Morning" (Bowie)	2:40

== Charts ==
Chart performance for "The Age of the Understatement"
Chart (2008)	Peak position
Australia (ARIA)	86
Belgium (Ultratip Bubbling Under Flanders)	2
Belgium (Ultratip Bubbling Under Wallonia)	19
European Hot 100 Singles (Billboard)	26
France (SNEP)	81
Ireland (IRMA)	34
Netherlands (Single Top 100)	97
Spain (Promusicae)	3
UK Singles (Official Charts)	9
UK Indie (Official Charts)	1

Year	Title	Chart positions
Year	Title	UK Singles Chart
2008	"Wondrous Place" (download only)	187
2008	"Two Hearts in Two Weeks" (download only)	182
2008	"In The Heat of the Morning" (download only)	111
