= Planeta No =

Chilean indie pop trio

- Origin: Concepción / Santiago, Chile
- Genres: Indie pop, synthpop, indie rock
- Years active: 2011 – present
- Labels: Beast Discos, Sello Azul
- Members: Gonzalo García; Camilo Molina; Juan Pablo Garín

Planeta No (In English: Planet No) is a Chilean trio of indie pop musicians formed in Concepción and settled in Santiago, composed of Gonzalo García, Camilo Molina and Juan Pablo Garín.

== History ==
Planeta No was formed in 2011 with a proposal of pop danceable with nuances of live punk. It debuted in 2013 with its single "Ya no veo mis zapatos", recorded at Estudios Janeiros with Milton Mahan's production of Dënver.

In 2014, they released their first EP, Matucana, edited by Beast Discos, which has won excellent reception thanks to their single "Señorita".

In 2015, they released their first album, Odio, through Sello Azul, where the singles "Sol a Sol" and "El Campo", what makes them known thanks to their flashy music videos. The album counted on a tour by Chile, Mexico and Peru for its promotion, and they appeared in the 2016 edition of Lollapalooza, in addition to have appeared before in important festivales of the country, like Rockodromo 2016, in Valparaíso, and the Rock en Conce 2016, in the capital of the Eighth Region. During 2016 they have promoted their album in Spain, Mexico, Peru, Colombia and Costa Rica, emphasizing their participation in the festival Primavera Sound 2016.

== Band members ==
- Gonzalo García - voice, guitar (2011–present)
- Camilo Molina - bass (2011–present)
- Juan Pablo Garín - drums (2011–present)

== Discography ==
=== Studio albums ===
- Odio (Hate) (2015, Sello Azul)

=== EPs ===
- Matucana (2014, Beast Discos)

=== Singles ===
- "Ya no veo mis zapatos" ("I do not see my shoes anymore") (2013)
- "Señorita" ("Miss") (2014)
- "Sol a Sol" ("Sun to sun") (2015)
- "El Campo" ("The Field") (2016)
