= Bad Habits (The Last Shadow Puppets song) =

Single by The Last Shadow Puppets

from the album Everything You've Come to Expect
- B-side: "The Bourne Identity"
- Released: 10 January 2016
- Genre: Garage rock; post-punk revival; gothic rock; orchestral rock
- Length: 3:00
- Label: Domino
- Songwriter(s): Alex Turner, Miles Kane
- Producer(s): James Ford

The Last Shadow Puppets singles chronology
"My Mistakes Were Made for You" (2008)	"Bad Habits" (2016)	"Everything You've Come to Expect" (2016)

"Bad Habits" is the lead single by English band The Last Shadow Puppets from their second studio album, Everything You've Come to Expect. It was released on 10 January 2016 on Domino Records, and is the first release of the band's second period of activity, making it their first single since "My Mistakes Were Made for You" (2008).

== Writing and recording ==
In an interview with Stacey Anderson for Interview, Kane states that "Bad Habits" originated with Turner playing the bass guitar and Kane singing over top. They admitted that the original take of the song came close to 40 minutes.

== Critical reception ==
Brennan Carley of Spin magazine wrote that "Bad Habits" has got "a loud, insistent, urgent sound to it, with a prominent string section underscoring the chaos with a sense of unease." Stereogum's Peter Helman noted that the song is "a brash, slitheringly groovy thing with an insistent bassline and some string section flourishes courtesy of maestro Owen Pallett."

== Music video ==
A music video for "Bad Habits" was released on 10 January 2016, at the same day of the single's release. It shows the group performing in a California dive bar, with short snippets of Turner and Kane recording, socialising and womanising. The video was directed by Ben Chappell.

== Track listing ==
Digital download
No.	Title	Length
1.	"Bad Habits"	3:00

Everything You've Come to Expect Deluxe LP – exclusive 7" vinyl
No.	Title	Length
1.	"Bad Habits"	3:00
2.	"The Bourne Identity"	3:05

== Personnel ==
The Last Shadow Puppets

- Alex Turner – acoustic guitar, backing vocals, additional bass guitar
- Miles Kane – lead vocals, electric guitar
- James Ford – drums, percussion, toy piano, Mellotron
- Zach Dawes – bass guitar, upright bass, vibraslap

Additional personnel

- Owen Pallett – strings arrangement

== Charts ==
Chart (2016)	Peak position
Belgium (Ultratop 50 Flanders)	46
