= Cinematic soul =

Genre of soul music

- Stylistic origins: Soul; psychedelic soul; orchestral music; film score
- Cultural origins: Early 1970s
- Typical instruments: Bass guitar; drums; horns; strings

Other topics
- Philadelphia soul; psychedelic funk

Cinematic soul is a genre of soul music with a "cinematic" style, combining traditional rock / soul arrangements with orchestral instruments.

== Style ==
Cinematic soul builds on the foundations of soul music. The backing track can include drums, bass guitar, clavinet and electric guitar played with a wah-wah pedal. On top of this are orchestral instruments including a string section and brass, similar to that heard on a movie soundtrack.

== History ==
During their psychedelic soul period of 1968–1973, The Temptations created what is described as "cinematic soul", songs, often long in length, with longer instrumental introductions and detailed orchestration. Two such examples are the Temptations' 1972 recording of "Papa Was a Rollin' Stone", and their follow-up single, "Masterpiece". Isaac Hayes' "Theme from Shaft" was considered another good example of cinematic soul, and subsequently influenced David Bowie's "Stay", released several years later. Curtis Mayfield's "Superfly" was a top ten Billboard hit, and praised as an archetypical example of the genre.

== Legacy ==
Artists continue to call their music cinematic soul into the 21st century. Barry Adamson's 2002 album The King of Nothing Hill opened with the track "Cinematic Soul", which was roughly based on "Theme from Shaft" and was conceived as a tribute to the genre. A compilation of the genre, Superbad Funk and Cinematic Soul was released in 2006. Singer/songwriter Jessica Lá Rel describes her music as cinematic soul, using soul as a base, then using other styles including classical and theatrical instrumentation. New York band Ikebe Shakedown has been described as cinematic soul.

== See also ==
- Blaxploitation film
- Plastic soul
