= Aviation (song) =

Single by The Last Shadow Puppets

from the album Everything You've Come to Expect
- Released: 16 March 2016
- Length: 3:43
- Label: Domino
- Songwriters: Alex Turner; Miles Kane
- Producer: James Ford

The Last Shadow Puppets singles chronology
"Everything You've Come to Expect" (2016)	"Aviation" (2016)	"Miracle Aligner" (2016)

Music video
- "Aviation" on YouTube

"Aviation" is the third single by English band The Last Shadow Puppets from their second studio album, Everything You've Come to Expect. It was released on 16 March 2016 on Domino Records.

== Background ==
In 2014, Kane and Turner were on the process of writing, what at the time, was thought to be Kane's next album. During one of those writing sessions, both "experimented with a vocal harmony" on a 8-track demo, which would later become "Aviation," this reminded them of their work on The Age of the Understament. The song was written in London, and Turner came up with the riff on New Year's Day.

The track, begins with an "echoing scrape of strings." Its first verse references sectoral heterochromia, an eye condition in which part of one iris is a different color from its remainder. Its second verse uses the term "coke-head close" to describe a woman, under the influence of the drug, loudly talking to the narrator. Turner wanted to use the word "Colorama" in a song since the first time he saw Michelangelo Antonioni's Blow-Up (1966), he described it as, "an unplugged neon light at the back of my mind for years," about the line he added, "It doesn't make a ton of sense, but that's not really the point. "I think, not always, but sometimes it's good to just have the lyrics facilitate a melody, like, that's harder to do, [...] — getting the fuckin’ ‘I Am The Walrus’ shit right." Musically, the track's been described as coming closest to the "Lee Hazlewood-indebted style" of their first record.

== Music video ==
The music video for "Aviation" features Turner and Kane digging holes on a beach as a man approaches in a car with a woman in bridal clothing. Kane turns and kisses the man, and a fight ensues before the woman runs down the beach and Turner and Kane are buried in the holes by the man's associates. The video serves as a prequel to the music video for "Everything You've Come to Expect".

The video was shot at Point Dume, Malibu. It was directed by Saam Farahmand and filmed in 16mm. Chung Chung-hoon served as DoP.

== Personnel ==
The Last Shadow Puppets

- Alex Turner – electric guitar, lead vocals
- Miles Kane – lead vocals, acoustic guitar
- James Ford – drums, percussion, keyboards
- Zach Dawes – bass guitar

Additional personnel

- Owen Pallett – strings arrangement

== Charts ==
Chart (2016)	Peak position
UK Singles (Official Charts Company)	150
