= Wondrous Place =

1960 song by Jimmy Jones

Single by Billy Fury
- B-side: "Alright, Goodbye"
- Released: 2 September 1960
- Recorded: 24 June 1960
- Studio: Decca Studios, London
- Genre: Pop
- Length: 2:26
- Label: Decca
- Songwriter(s): Jeff Lewis; Bill Giant
- Producer(s): Jack Good

Billy Fury singles chronology
"That's Love" (1960)	"Wondrous Place" (1960)	"A Thousand Stars" (1960)

"Wondrous Place" is a song written by Jeff Lewis and Bill Giant and first released by American singer Jimmy Jones on his debut album Good Timin in May 1960. English singer Billy Fury released a version as a single in September 1960.

Fury's version peaked at number 25 on the Record Retailer Top 50, now seen as the UK Singles Chart, in October 1960 and the song gained further recognition nearly forty years later in 1999 when Fury's version was used on a UK television advertisement for the Toyota Yaris. Two versions were then re-released as singles: a 1983 re-recording by K-tel (as the official advert release), which peaked at number 83 on the singles chart, and the original single version by Deram Records (who had released The 40th Anniversary Anthology six months earlier), which peaked at number 98.

== Track listing ==
7": Decca / F 11267

1. "Wondrous Place" – 2:26
2. "Alright, Goodbye" – 2:04

CD: K-tel / TOY9051-2 (1999)

1. "Wondrous Place"
2. "It's Only Make Believe"
3. "Last Night Was Made for Love"

CD: Deram / 882 267-2 (1999)

1. "Wondrous Place" – 2:23
2. "Halfway to Paradise" – 2:26
3. "Jealousy" – 2:45

== Other cover versions ==
- In 1962, American singer Rod Lauren released a cover of the song as a single.
- In 1963, singer Aart Brouwer issued a Dutch-language cover version, retitled Vies
- In 1963, singer Joe Costa (better known as Joey Cord) released a cover
- In 1965, The Cherokees released a version on a Columbia record
- In 1966, English-born singer Tony Barber released a cover of the song as a single.
- In 1990, English band Guana Batz covered the song on their album Electra Glide in Blue.
- In 1996, American musician Marshall Crenshaw covered the song on his album Miracle of Science.
- In 2008, English supergroup The Last Shadow Puppets released a cover of the song as a B-side to their debut single "The Age of the Understatement".
- In 2008, Australian singer Jason Donovan covered the song on his album Let It Be Me.
- In 2011, English singer-songwriter Alice Gold released a cover of the song as a single, which was used in an advert for beer brand Carling.
- In 2022, The Drug Store Romeos also released a version, which was used in an Apple commercial in 2023.
