= The Last Shadow Puppets =

English band

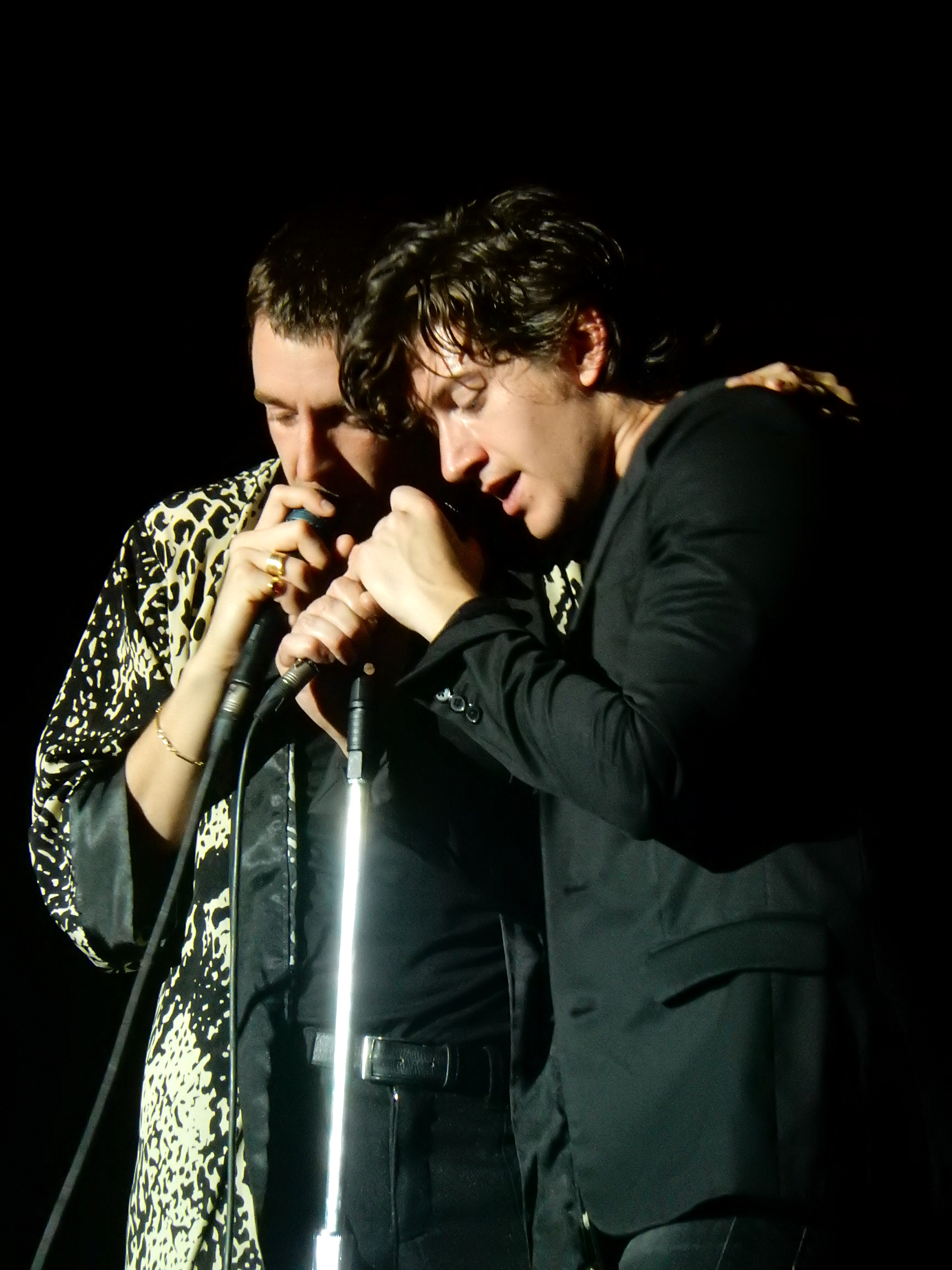
- The band at Rock en Seine in Paris, 2016

Background information
- Origin: England
- Genres: Baroque pop; orchestral pop; psychedelic pop
- Years active: 2007–2008; 2010; 2015–2017
- Label: Domino
- Spinoff of: Arctic Monkeys
- Members: Alex Turner; Miles Kane; James Ford; Zach Dawes
- Website: thelastshadowpuppets.com

The Last Shadow Puppets are a British supergroup consisting of Alex Turner (Arctic Monkeys), Miles Kane (the Little Flames, the Rascals), James Ford (Simian, Simian Mobile Disco), and Zach Dawes (Mini Mansions).

The Last Shadow Puppets were formed by co-frontmen, Alex Turner and Miles Kane, in 2007, after they became friends when the Little Flames supported Arctic Monkeys on tour in 2005. They bonded over their shared love of Scott Walker and David Bowie, and decided to write songs inspired by their music. They have released two records, The Age of the Understatement (2008), and following a lengthy hiatus, Everything You've Come to Expect (2016). Both of their albums reached number one in the UK charts. They were nominated for a BRIT Award in the British Breakthrough category, and shortlisted for a Mercury Prize in the Best Album category, for The Age of the Understatement.

== History ==
=== 2007: Formation ===
In August 2007 NME magazine reported that Arctic Monkeys lead singer Alex Turner and lead singer of then newly formed the Rascals, Miles Kane would be recording an album with Simian Mobile Disco member and former Simian drummer James Ford producing and playing drums. Turner and Kane had become friends when Kane's previous band the Little Flames played support for Arctic Monkeys on their 2005 UK tour. The Little Flames also supported Arctic Monkeys on their April 2007 UK tour, when Turner and Kane wrote songs together for a collaborative project. Their collaboration extended into Arctic Monkeys material, with Kane playing guitar on "505", the closing track of second Arctic Monkeys album Favourite Worst Nightmare and on "Fluorescent Adolescent" B-sides "The Bakery" and "Plastic Tramp". Kane also guested on "505" and "Plastic Tramp" at several Arctic Monkeys gigs in 2007, including the summer mini-festivals at Lancashire County Cricket Club and Arctic Monkeys' 2007 & 2013 appearances at Glastonbury.

=== 2007–2008: The Age of the Understatement ===
The initial recording of the songs that would eventually form their debut album took place in France in late August 2007 with additional material added between August and December that year. In December, Owen Pallett was appointed to arrange the strings, brass and percussion for the album with the 22-piece London Metropolitan Orchestra. During the recording of the album Turner and Kane hired a documentary film-making team, Luke Seomore and Joseph Bull, to capture the story of the project. On 20 February 2008, Miles Kane and Alex Turner revealed they would be known as the Last Shadow Puppets and that their album, titled The Age of the Understatement, would be released on 21 April 2008. At first, the band chose the name Shadow Puppets because they thought it sounded like a 60's girl groups band name, which they were listening to a lot at the time, yet added The Last to it as the name was already registered. They also considered Turner and Kane but quickly discarded it because it sounded "like a bad cop film". The band played their first ever show in Brooklyn, New York, at Sound Fix Records on 4 March 2008, playing a second gig at the Lower East Side's Cake Shop the following night. Their first show in the United Kingdom was a short two song set on 5 April at the Lock Tavern in Camden, London. They played "Meeting Place" and "Standing Next to Me" in support of Remi Nicole, who organised the party both to celebrate her birthday and to raise money for MS sufferers.

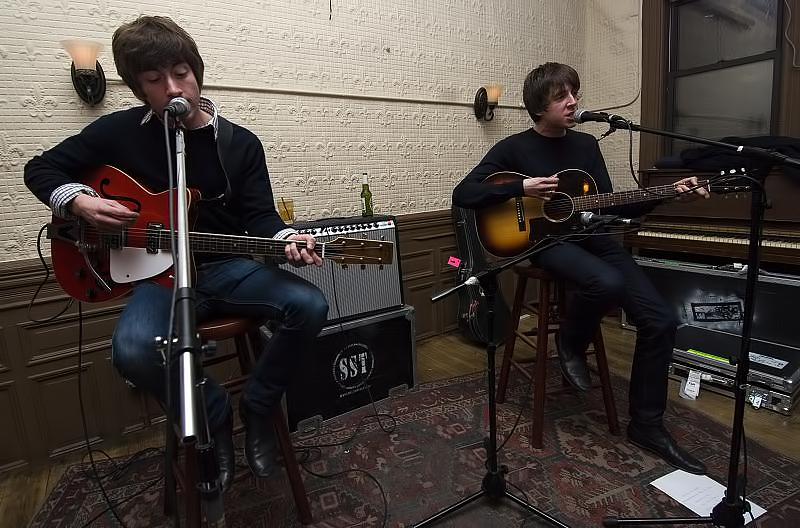
The Last Shadow Puppets at the Sound Fix Records Studio.

The album went straight to number one in the UK Albums Chart. The first single, "The Age of the Understatement", was released the week before on 14 April, with new song "Two Hearts in Two Weeks" and covers of Billy Fury's "Wondrous Place" and David Bowie's "In the Heat of the Morning" —a song previously mentioned by Turner as a favourite— as b-sides. After the album release the band played a secret set at Glastonbury on 28 June 2008 with Arctic Monkeys drummer Matt Helders playing drums on "The Age of the Understatement" and Jack White playing a guitar solo on "Wondrous Place". Two days later, they announced their debut world tour, which would start on 19 August that year. On 4 July 2008, they performed "Standing Next to Me" as part of a birthday present for Jo Whiley on BBC Radio 1. They also performed a cover of Rihanna's "SOS". Their second single, "Standing Next to Me", was released on 7 July 2008. That same month, the album was nominated for the 2008 Mercury Music Prize but lost out to Elbow's The Seldom Seen Kid.

In August, the band and a 16-piece orchestra, played their first tour shows at Portsmouth Guildhall and New Theatre Oxford, before attending Reading and Leeds Festivals 2008. Kane said the two festival stops would be "our [the band] first proper gigs". Their Leeds set was described by The Guardian as "a classy offering from the Puppets. But, maybe, that isn't what's needed at a festival on a Friday night". The first leg of the tour ended with a show at The Olympia in Paris on 26 August. The tour restarted in October at Cirkus in Stockholm, and continued in continental Europe, throughout the rest of the month. On 20 October the album's third single, "My Mistakes Were Made for You", was released. Four days later they played a show at Philharmonic Hall, Liverpool as part of the Electric Proms. Their London and Sheffield shows were generally well received by both fans and critics. In a 2008 interview with Mojo, they mentioned plans of relocating to New York to work on a future second album, featuring a live orchestra in the style of "Tony Bennett or something", Kane said. But the project did not materialize. Turner and Kane played their last show, before going back to their respective careers, at the Mayan Theater of Los Angeles on 3 November 2008.

=== 2009–2015: First hiatus ===
Now on a hiatus, and working with their bands, Turner and Kane reunited briefly at the Shockwaves NME Awards on 25 February 2009, where they won Best Music Video for My Mistakes Were Made For You directed by Richard Ayoade. In a March 2010 interview with Absolute Radio, Alex Turner said that there were no plans for new material, however, Kane said in October 2010 they would get back together after he was done with his solo project. That summer, the band played an acoustic set at Club Nokia in Los Angeles, for Brian O'Connor's benefit concert. This marked the first live performance of the band since 2008. A year later, Turner confirmed his interests in recording a second album. In January 2012, Kane added that he would reunite with Turner to record again as the Last Shadow Puppets "when the time is right." In February 2012, Miles Kane supported Arctic Monkeys at their Paris Olympia show. At the conclusion of the support slot, Turner joined Kane and his band to perform "Standing Next to Me". This was repeated again a year later at Kane's Glastonbury set, near the end of his performance. In October that year Kane, now joining the Arctic Monkeys on their headline set in Mexico, performed their last song "505" together. At Finsbury Park 2014, both reunited once more for an acoustic performance of "Standing Next to Me".

=== 2015–2016: Everything You've Come to Expect ===
In 2015 both Turner and Kane were involved in the writing of Kane's third solo album. During those sessions, the song that would later be known as Aviation was the seed for the new Puppets record, as it sparked their desire to get the band together. During the summer of 2015 Turner, Kane, Ford and new member Zach Dawes started recording their second album at the recording studio Shangri-La in Malibu, California. On 19 October 2015 Owen Pallett, who contributed the string arrangements on The Age of the Understatement, confirmed work on the second album on Twitter. In an interview with the Chilean site Rock & Pop on 17 November 2015, producer James Ford confirmed that work on the second album had been completed and that the record would be released sometime in Spring 2016. When asked of his recent work, Ford said, "This year, I've just done a Last Shadow Puppets record, which is the guy from Arctic Monkeys and Miles. So we did the follow-up album to that. That's the last thing I did." On 3 December 2015, the band's official Facebook and YouTube pages released a teaser trailer for the album, also confirming for the album to be released sometime in Spring 2016. People such as Turner's ex-girlfriend, Taylor Bagley, and Zach Dawes of Mini Mansions made small cameos in the video. A second teaser trailer for the album was released on 28 December 2015. The video featured Kane impersonating wrestler Ric Flair along with videos from the studio and various cinematic shots.

On 10 January 2016, the band released their first single since 2008. The song, "Bad Habits", was accompanied with a music video filmed in the same style as the first two teaser trailers. On 21 January 2016, the band announced that their second album would be entitled Everything You've Come to Expect, and would feature the return of all three previous band members, as well as the addition of bass player Zach Dawes. It was set to be released on 1 April 2016. A few days later, they announced their 2016 tour dates in support of the album, set to start in March with a show at Usher Hall in Edinburgh. Two shows were later added during March in Cambridge and Middlesbrough. On 10 March 2016, the band released the title track from Everything You've Come to Expect, as the album's second single. An accompanying music video was also released, of which there is 9 varieties, depicting Turner and Kane buried up to their necks on a beach while a woman dances around them. A week later the track "Aviation", was released as the 3rd single. A video similar in style to Everything You've Come to Expect was released, showing Turner and Kane, digging a sand pit on the same beach they were buried on in the previous video. On 29 March 2016, the band released a 4th song, "Miracle Aligner", alongside a video that closed the trilogy started by the second single, before the release of the entire album.

While on tour, the band promoted the album with appearances on television programmes such as Le Grand Journal, Late Night with Seth Meyers, The Late Late Show with James Corden, and Later...with Jools Holland. And headlining sets in festivals such as Coachella, Radio 1's Big Weekend, Primavera Sound, Rockwave, T in the Park, and Lollapalooza in Chicago. In June 2016, the band performed on the pyramid stage at Glastonbury. During the set, they performed a cover of "Moonage Daydream" in memory of David Bowie. In July, the band played two nights at Alexandra Palace in London, on the second date, they were joined by Johnny Marr for a cover of The Smiths' "Last Night I Dreamt That Somebody Loved Me." They ended their 2016 tour on 26 August by playing at the Rock en Seine festival in Paris, France. Four months after their last tour date, the band released The Dream Synopsis, an EP containing re-recordings of two songs, "Aviation" and "The Dream Synopsis", as well as four cover versions of The Fall's "Totally Wired", Jacques Dutronc's "Les Cactus", Glaxo Babies's "This Is Your Life", and Leonard Cohen's "Is This What You Wanted". Each cover had an accompanying music video except for "Totally Wired".

=== 2017–present: Second hiatus ===
Two years after their last official release, Turner joined Miles Kane during a show at La Cigale in Paris, for a performance of the band's staple song, "Standing Next To Me". In September 2021, during an interview with Clash Magazine, Kane said a new a project could "probably be in about four years," adding, "I think there's a bit of a myth about it and I quite like that," in regards to the eight year wait between The Age of the Understatement and Everything You've Come to Expect. On 18 June 2023 Miles Kane joined Arctic Monkeys at their Emirates Stadium show, playing guitar on 505 before embarking on his own One Man Band tour. Kane supported Arctic Monkeys on their Ireland tour in October 2023, playing guitar on the song 505.

== Artistry ==
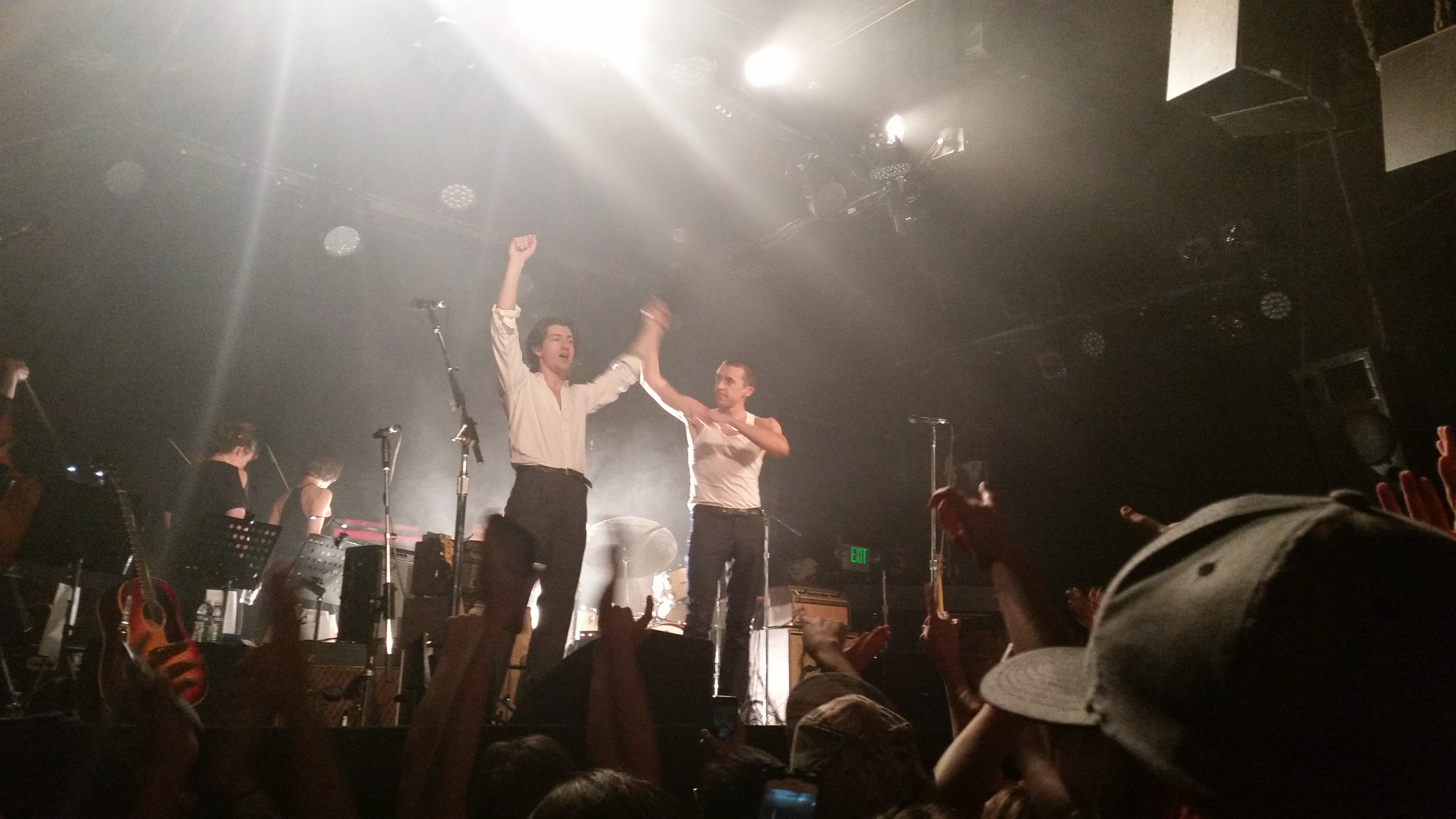
The band at Catalyst Club, Santa Cruz, 2016.

=== Influences ===
The Last Shadow Puppets' musical style has been mainly described as Baroque pop, orchestral pop, and psychedelic pop, while also drawing heavily from vintage film scores, and post-punk. Turner and Kane have cited Scott Walker and David Bowie as main influences, with Turner saying, "[Bowie] is sort of in the DNA of every record, to some extent. He's been built-in for a long time". Other artists that served as inspiration for the band include, Ennio Morricone, Serge Gainsbourg, David Axelrod, Lee Hazlewood, Jaques Brel, Isaac Hayes and bands such as, the Style Council, the Electric Prunes, Sparks, Depeche Mode and the Fall.

=== Stage personas and relationship ===
"To try to answer your question, it's probably in the show that the space between taking it seriously and not taking it seriously is best occupied. I like to be in a place where I can reach for both. The keys to that corridor aren't always attainable."

— Alex Turner on performing.

The band outfits are usually designed by Kane and Ray Brown. Turner commented on their change in appearance from their first album to the second saying "We've gone from the Beatles to the Fast and the Furious". When asked about the way the band presents itself on stage Kane said: "...We're just sort of having fun in those characters but we're very much serious, its not like we're taking the piss, its just like why not be a bit flamboyant if you've got it in you, you know? The bands are so boring now days, you know, if someone wants to be a bit extravagant then I don't see why not. The bands I love were more extravagant and extreme than we are. If everyone wants to stay square then they can stay square." Turner felt similarly, "I've had the phase where I enjoyed being part of a 'well-oiled machine' and I'm currently subscribing to the notion that the most unpredictable or unlikely moments are probably the most entertaining." Adding that "For me the idea of a flamboyant performance came later," as opposed to Kane, whom he described as "a bloody natural". He also, felt the band allowed him to perform differently than with the Arctic Monkeys, as Kane singing with him gave him "somewhere to hide". In a review for a show of their 2016 tour, Colm O'Regan of Hot Press said: "Like a pair of teenagers egging each other on, Turner and Kane are the most infatuated frontmen since Pete Doherty and Carl Barât. Large portions of their singing, dancing, playing and general tomfoolery are aimed not at the audience, but at each other."

Kane and Turner's friendship is often an object of discussion, and has been described by the media as a "bromance", due to its closeness. This has led to the use, by both fans and journalists, of the portmanteau, "Milex", when talking about their shared exploits. They have referred to each other as "best mates", having bonded over their similar music taste, sense of humor, and upbringing: "we discovered that our mums have got the same kettle and toaster. Seriously. And they have the same aura. They're very similar women. We're both only children, too." In an interview with The Times, Turner claimed their first record was the consequence of friendship, not ambition, adding, "Me and Miles, if we had grown up in the same area and gone to the same school, maybe we'd be in a band together anyway," adding in another interview, "With such a close friendship we have. Wanting to work together, it brings something else. I haven't done too much with other people… he's kind of the only one." Hamish McBain of ShortList shared the sentiment, saying, "It's a friendship and a band born out of a desire to hang around together, egging each other on into more flamboyant outfits, [...] most of all better music". Dorian Lynskey of GQ said the band had "the arch, cliquey, slightly camp sense of humour of a music-hall duo or a Beatles press conference, with a taste for silly voices and inscrutable injokes".

== Awards and nominations ==
Year	Award	Category	Nominated work	Result
2008	MOJO Awards	Breakthrough Artist	Themselves	Won
2008	Mercury Prize	Best Album	The Age of the Understatement	Shortlisted
2008	UK Music Video Awards	Best Cinematography	"The Age of the Understatement"	Won
2008	Q Awards	Best New Act	Themselves	Won
2009	BRIT Awards	British Breakthrough	Themselves	Nominated
2009	NME Awards	Best British Band	Themselves	Nominated
2009	NME Awards	Best Video	"My Mistakes Were Made for You"	Won

== Band members ==
- Alex Turner – vocals, guitar, bass, percussion, keyboards (2007–present)
- Miles Kane – vocals, guitar, bass, saxophone (2007–present)
- James Ford – drums, percussion, keyboards (2007–present)
- Zach Dawes – bass, percussion, guitar, keyboards (2015–present)

Live members

- Alex MacNaghten − bass (2008)
- Stephen Fretwell – bass (2008)
- John Ashton – keyboards, guitar, percussion, backing vocals (2008)
- Loren Humphrey − drums, percussion (2016)
- Tyler Parkford − keyboards, backing vocals (2016)
- Scott Gilles − acoustic guitar (2016)
- Davey Latter − percussion (2016)

Additional live members

- Caroline Buckman – violin (2016)
- Claudia Chopek – violin (2016)
- Jennifer Takamatsu – violin (2016)
- Mikala Schmitz – cello (2016)

Timeline

== Discography ==
=== Studio albums ===
Title	Album details	Peak chart positions										Certifications
Title	Album details	UK	AUS	BEL (FL)	BEL (WA)	FRA	IRL	NLD	NOR	SWE	US	Certifications
The Age of the Understatement	Released: 21 April 2008; Label: Domino; Formats: LP, CD, digital download	1	30	4	39	18	2	12	23	34	111	BPI: Platinum
Everything You've Come to Expect	Released: 1 April 2016; Label: Domino; Formats: LP, CD, digital download	1	9	1	6	6	3	2	36	58	83	BPI: Gold

=== Extended plays ===
Title	EP details	Peak chart positions			
Title	EP details	UK	UK Indie	NLD Mid.	SCO
Standing Next to Me	Released: 7 July 2008 (US); Label: Domino; Formats: CD, digital download	—	—	—	—
My Mistakes Were Made for You	Released: 20 October 2008 (US); Label: Domino; Formats: CD, digital download	—	—	—	—
The Dream Synopsis	Released: 2 December 2016; Label: Domino; Formats: LP, CD, digital download	55	5	17	57
"—" denotes a recording that did not chart or was not released in that territory.

=== Singles ===
Title	Year	Peak chart positions										Certifications	Album
Title	Year	UK	AUS	BEL (FL)	EU	FRA	IRL	NLD	POL	SCO	SPA	Certifications	Album
"The Age of the Understatement"	2008	9	86	— (Note: "The Age of the Understatement" did not enter the Flanders Ultratop Top 50, but peaked at two on the Ultratop Bubbling Under chart.)	26	81	34	97	13	4	3		The Age of the Understatement
"Standing Next to Me"	2008	30	— (Note: "Standing Next to Me" did not enter the Australian ARIA Singles Chart but peaked at number 10 on the ARIA Hitseekers Chart.)	— (Note: "Standing Next to Me" did not enter the Flanders Ultratop Top 50, but peaked at 10 on the Ultratop Bubbling Under chart.)	—	64	—	—	36	10	13		The Age of the Understatement
"My Mistakes Were Made for You"	2008	81	—	— (Note: "My Mistakes Were Made for You" did not enter the Flanders Ultratop Top 50, but peaked at two on the Ultratop Bubbling Under chart.)	87	64	—	75	15	8	—		The Age of the Understatement
"Bad Habits"	2016	—	—	46	—	—	—	—	—	—	—		Everything You've Come to Expect
"Everything You've Come to Expect"	2016	—	—	—	—	—	—	—	—	—	—		Everything You've Come to Expect
"Aviation"	2016	150	—	— (Note: "Aviation" did not enter the Flanders Ultratop Top 50, but peaked at two on the Ultratop Bubbling Under chart.)	—	—	—	—	—	—	—		Everything You've Come to Expect
"Miracle Aligner"	2016	180	—	— (Note: "Miracle Aligner" did not enter the Flanders Ultratop Top 50, but peaked at 23 on the Ultratop Bubbling Under chart.)	—	199	—	—	—	—	—	BPI: Silver	Everything You've Come to Expect
"Is This What You Wanted"	2016	—	—	— (Note: "Is This What You Wanted" did not enter the Flanders Ultratop Top 50, but charted as an extra tip on the Ultratop Bubbling Under chart.)	—	—	—	—	—	—	—		The Dream Synopsis
"Les Cactus"	2016	—	—	— (Note: "Les Cactus" did not enter the Flanders Ultratop Top 50, but peaked at 15 on the Ultratop Bubbling Under chart.)	—	—	—	—	—	—	—		The Dream Synopsis
"—" denotes a single that did not chart or was not released in that territory.

=== Other charting songs ===
Title	Year	Peak chart positions				Album
Title	Year	UK	UK Indie	FRA	MEX Eng.	Album
"In The Heat of the Morning"	2008	111	—	—	—	"The Age of the Understatement" single
"Two Hearts in Two Weeks"	2008	182	—	—	—	"The Age of the Understatement" single
"Wondrous Place"	2008	187	—	—	—	"The Age of the Understatement" single
"Dracula Teeth"	2016	—	32	—	—	Everything You've Come to Expect
"The Element of Surprise"	2016	—	37	—	—	Everything You've Come to Expect
"Sweet Dreams, TN"	2016	—	29	—	—	Everything You've Come to Expect
"Used to Be My Girl"	2016	—	39	—	—	Everything You've Come to Expect
"Pattern"	2016	—	48	—	—	Everything You've Come to Expect
"The Dream Synopsis"	2016	—	—	54	—	The Dream Synopsis
"This Is Your Life"	2017	—	—	—	38	The Dream Synopsis
"—" denotes a song that did not chart or was not released in that territory.
