= Jack Robinson (photographer) =

American photographer and stained glass designer

Jack Robinson Jr.
- Born: September 18, 1928
- Died: December 15, 1997 (aged 69)
- Occupations: Photographer, designer

Jack Robinson Jr. (September 18, 1928 – December 15, 1997) was an American photographer and stained glass designer. Robinson was freelance photographer for Vogue and The New York Times from the 1950s to the early 1970s before he left New York to return home to the American South and pursue a career as a stained glass designer.

== Photography career ==
Jack Uther Robinson Jr. was born in Meridian, Mississippi on September 18, 1928 to Jack Robinson, Sr. and Euline Jones Robinson. The family soon moved to Clarksdale, Mississippi, where Jack attended Clarksdale public school and graduated in 1946. In Clarkesdale Robinson is said to have been somewhat shy and reclusive, often choosing to stay at home and paint and draw rather than socialize with peers. It was during those years that he began to develop a talent for photography. Late in 1946 Robinson left Clarksdale to attend Tulane University in New Orleans, initially planning to pursue a career in medicine.

It was in New Orleans that Robinson began his career in photography. Much of his early work was shot in the French Quarter where he documented street scenes and vibrant nightlife. He frequented Dixie's Bar of Music, a Bourbon Street club which was a center of the New Orleans gay community in the 1950s and 1960s, and hangout of artists and writers such as Lyle Saxon, Tennessee Williams, Truman Capote, and Gore Vidal. During this period he refined his talent as a photographer, capturing portraits of notable figures of the southern bohemian art and culture scene in New Orleans, and documenting the gay community's involvement in Mardi Gras. This involvement would segue into the formation of the first gay Carnival krewe, the Krewe of Yuga in 1958.

In the summer of 1954 Robinson travelled to Mexico with Betty Parsons (the famous New York art dealer), Dusti Bongé (Abstract Expressionist painter), and his partner Gabriel Juridini, and photographed scenes of Mexican life. At Parsons' encouragement, he moved to New York probably in the spring of 1955 to pursue a career in fashion photography. He was quickly recognized as an emerging talent and was sought out by top designers in the fashion industry. In 1959 he shot his first major cover for a fashion special for Life Magazine. In the late 1950s he began free-lancing for the New York Times under style editor Carrie Donovan. His relationship with Donovan proved to be important for Robinson. When she left the newspaper in 1965 to work for Vogue, she brought Robinson with her.

At Vogue Robinson shot regularly for the running sections "Vogue's own Boutique," a monthly feature that utilized celebrities as models in various boutiques around New York, and "People are Talking About," a feature that profiled up and coming personalities in arts, entertainment, and politics. He worked closely with editor Diana Vreeland, who recognized his talent early on. Additionally, he contributed photographs to many other Vogue articles. It was at Vogue that Robinson photographed many of his most famous subjects including Elton John, Joni Mitchell, Jack Nicholson, and Cher. Robinson remained at Vogue for the duration of his time in New York, amassing a large body of work between 1965 and 1972.

Robinson's career as a photographer was not, however, to continue past the early 1970s. In the late 1960s he began frequenting Andy Warhol's Factory in Manhattan and his lifestyle gradually shifted towards the excesses that were typical of the Factory scene of the era. By 1972 he had developed a serious drinking problem and his professional career and financial stability began to unravel as a result. After Vreeland was fired from the magazine and his partner Gabriel suddenly died, Robinson's once steady flow of work had slowed to a trickle by the end of 1972 . Facing financial problems he left New York and moved south to Memphis, Tennessee. His career as a professional photographer was over, and it was a part of his life that Robinson would seldom speak of in years to come. He became an intensely private person. For reasons not at all clear, he seemed determined to remain anonymous. He once confided in a friend that "he wanted a coffee table book after he was dead, but he just didn't want any limelight while he was alive."

== Stained glass career ==
Back in Memphis Robinson pulled his life back together. He joined Alcoholics Anonymous, quit drinking, and began working for a local stained glass studio run by Dan Oppenheimer, the Rainbow Studio. His primary work was in designing church windows, which can be seen today in churches across the American South. His most notable achievement in the stained glass field was winning the international competition for the design and fabrication of the stained glass windows in the Danny Thomas chapel at St. Jude Children's Research Hospital in Memphis.

== Legacy ==
By the early 1970s Jack had established himself as one of the leading fashion and portrait photographers in the world. In 1974, Vogue unveiled a retrospective of "50 Years of Women in Vogue". Newsweek magazine covered the show and printed a two-page spread that featured six photographs: one by Richard Avedon, two by Irving Penn, one by George Hoyningen-Huene, one by Edward Steichen, and one by Jack Robinson. Robinson's work was clearly regarded as among the best of his contemporaries. In 2007, New York fashion magazine MAO MAG published an article entitled "Who was Jack Robinson?" in which they profiled Robinson and his career. They wrote:

In his 17 year career, Jack Robinson was one of the editorial world's most accomplished photographers (in fact, one of Diana Vreeland's favorites) and had exclusive access to film actors, music stars, fashion designers, artists, sports figures, politicians, and socialites via his assignments for Vogue, The New York Times, and Life but his self exile from New York in 1973 and his determination never to talk about his prolific past continues to shroud his career in mystery.

Today, Robinson is being recognized posthumously for his talent, and his work has been shown in galleries around the world including Staley-Wise Gallery in New York, Getty Gallery in London, and Bryant Gallery in New Orleans.

== Publications ==
- Jack Robinson On Show: Portraits 1958-72, 2011 (Foreword by Cybill Shepherd; introduction by George Perry)
- Howard Philips Smith, A Sojourn in Paradise: Jack Robinson in 1950s New Orleans, 2020 (Foreword by Emily Oppenheimer)

== Notable photographs ==
Celebrity:

- Joni Mitchell in Peasant Dress with Guitar, 1968
- Jack Nicholson, Clasped Fingers, 1970
- James Taylor, Outstretched Arm, 1969
- The Who, Jump, 1969
- Elton John, at the Piano, 1970
- Gloria Vanderbilt and Family at Home, 1972
- Cher in Fur at the Walforf, 1970
- Andy Warhol and Gerard Malanga with Movie Camera, 1965
- Everly Brothers First Album Cover, 1958

Fashion:

- Suzy Parker in White Fur, 1959
- Anne St. Marie in Elizabeth Arden Gown, 1959
- Wilhelmina in Choker for Life Magazine, 1959
- Emilio Pucci, Scaffold with Models, 1960
- Lauren Hutton in Studio, 1972
- Berry Berenson for Charlie Perfume Campaign, 1972
