= Hotter than Hell =

Hotter than Hell may refer to:

- Hotter than Hell (album), a 1974 album by Kiss
  - "Hotter than Hell" (Kiss song), the album's title song
  - Hotter than Hell Tour, the album's associated concert tour
- Hotter than Hell Live, a 1990 album by Barren Cross
- "Hotter than Hell" (Dua Lipa song), 2016
  - Hotter than Hell (Dua Lipa Tour), associated concert tour
