= My Mistakes Were Made for You =

Single by The Last Shadow Puppets

from the album The Age of the Understatement
- Released: 20 October 2008
- Recorded: 2007
- Label: Domino
- Songwriters: Alex Turner, Miles Kane
- Producer: James Ford

The Last Shadow Puppets singles chronology
"Standing Next to Me" (2008)	"My Mistakes Were Made for You" (2008)	"Bad Habits" (2016)

Music video
- "My Mistakes Were Made For You" on YouTube

Alternative cover

The Age of the Understatement track listing
- 1. "The Age of the Understatement"; 2. "Standing Next to Me"; 3. "Calm Like You"; 4. "Separate and Ever Deadly"; 5. "The Chamber"; 6. "Only the Truth"; 7. "My Mistakes Were Made for You"; 8. "Black Plant"; 9. "I Don't Like You Anymore"; 10. "In My Room"; 11. "The Meeting Place"; 12. "Time Has Come Again"

"My Mistakes Were Made for You" is the third single released by The Last Shadow Puppets. It was released on 20 October 2008 in the United Kingdom on Domino Records, featuring three b-sides: a live version of the album track "Separate and Ever Deadly" plus two covers. The US-only 8-song expanded EP was released in digital format on 21 October and on CD on 4 November 2008. It was the final release of the band's first period of activity.

The song was inspired by Scott Walker's song "The Old Man's Back Again", off his album Scott 4. The song also appears to glean influences from Noel Harrison's "The Windmills of Your Mind".

== Music video ==
The video for "My Mistakes Were Made for You" was shot at Pinewood studios and directed by Richard Ayoade. The music video shows Turner on a crashed car with Alexa Chung, his then girlfriend. Kane appears later. It won best video award at the NME Awards 2009.

The video was inspired by Federico Fellini's cult film Toby Dammit.

== Reception ==
Professional ratings
Review scores
Source	Rating
Pitchfork	5.8/10

For Pitchfork, Marc Hogan wrote, "The Last Shadow Puppets' album blows up its creators' musical and lyrical vision to late-1960s cinematic proportions. The My Mistakes Were Made for You EP is more like your average set of special-edition DVD extras." Adding, "No new original material, no radical departures, just an unnecessary glimpse behind the curtain".

== Track listing ==
All lyrics are written by Alex Turner and Miles Kane, except where noted; all music is composed by The Last Shadow Puppets.

CD RUG309CD
No.	Title	Length
1.	"My Mistakes Were Made for You"	3:04
2.	"Paris Summer" (Guest vocals by Alison Mosshart) (live from The Olympia, Paris) (Hazlewood)	3:38
3.	"My Little Red Book" (live from New Theatre, Oxford) (David/Bacharach)	2:42

7" RUG309
No.	Title	Length
1.	"My Mistakes Were Made for You"	3:04
2.	"Paris Summer" (Guest vocals by Alison Mosshart) (live from The Olympia, Paris) (Hazlewood)	3:38

7" RUG309X
No.	Title	Length
1.	"My Mistakes Were Made for You"	3:04
2.	"Separate and Ever Deadly" (live from New Theatre, Oxford)	2:58

EP (US only)
No.	Title	Length
1.	"My Mistakes Were Made for You"	3:04
2.	"Separate and Ever Deadly" (live from New Theatre, Oxford)	2:58
3.	"Paris Summer" (Guest vocals by Alison Mosshart) (live from The Olympia, Paris) (Hazlewood)	3:38
4.	"My Little Red Book" (live from New Theatre, Oxford) (David/Bacharach)	2:42
5.	"The Age of the Understatement" (acoustic)	2:57
6.	"Standing Next to Me" (acoustic)	2:26
7.	"The Meeting Place" (acoustic)	2:51
8.	"My Mistakes Were Made for You" (acoustic)	2:58

== Charts ==
Chart (2008)	Peak position
European Hot 100 Singles	87
French Singles Chart	64
Netherlands Singles Chart	75
UK Singles Chart	81
UK Indie (Official Charts)	1
