= Everything You've Come to Expect (song) =

Single by The Last Shadow Puppets

from the album Everything You've Come to Expect
- Released: 10 March 2016
- Genre: Baroque pop; psychedelic pop
- Length: 3:13
- Label: Domino
- Songwriters: Alex Turner; Miles Kane
- Producer: James Ford

The Last Shadow Puppets singles chronology
"Bad Habits" (2016)	"Everything You've Come to Expect" (2016)	"Aviation" (2016)

Music video
- "Everything You've Come to Expect" on YouTube

"Everything You've Come to Expect" is a song by English baroque pop band The Last Shadow Puppets released on 10 March 2016, through Domino Recording Company. The song was included on their second studio album, Everything You've Come to Expect (2016). Written by co-frontmen Alex Turner and Miles Kane, and produced by James Ford, "Everything You've Come to Expect" is a baroque pop and psychedelic pop track.

== Background ==
Musically "Everything You've Come to Expect" has been described as a "psychedelic waltz" and has been called "Beatle-esque". The song finds Turner as "a jealous guy", among a "phantasmagoria of surreal visions of decadence". The song references several songs and musicians, with the line "Croc-skin collar on a diamond dog" recalling David Bowie's album of the same name. The mention of Honey Pie on the preceding verse, was thought to be a Beatles reference, although Turner admitted it was coincidental. Another line, "I just can't get the thought of you and him out of my head", was described as "textbook Turner lust", with one reviewer alluding to an homoerotic reading of the line, noting that "Maybe they're singing it at each other". The band has said it was the last song written for the album, and "the further down the wing" they have gone in terms of songwriting, adding that its their favourite track in the record. Turner said the song was written on a Vox Continental keyboard.

== Music video ==
Still picture from the "Everything You've Come to Expect" video.

The music video for "Everything You've Come to Expect" was released on 10 March 2016 and features Turner and Kane submerged in sand up to their necks, with a woman in bridal clothing (Michelle Dawley) scolding Turner and dancing around the beach. It serves as the second installment of the album's video trilogy initiated by Aviation.

The video was shot in one day at Point Dume, Malibu. It was directed by Saam Farahmand and filmed in 16mm. Chung Chung-hoon served as DoP.

== Personnel ==
The Last Shadow Puppets

- Alex Turner
- Miles Kane
- James Ford
- Zach Dawes

Additional personnel

- Owen Pallett – strings arrangement
- Matt Helders – backing vocals
