= Matilde Davoli =

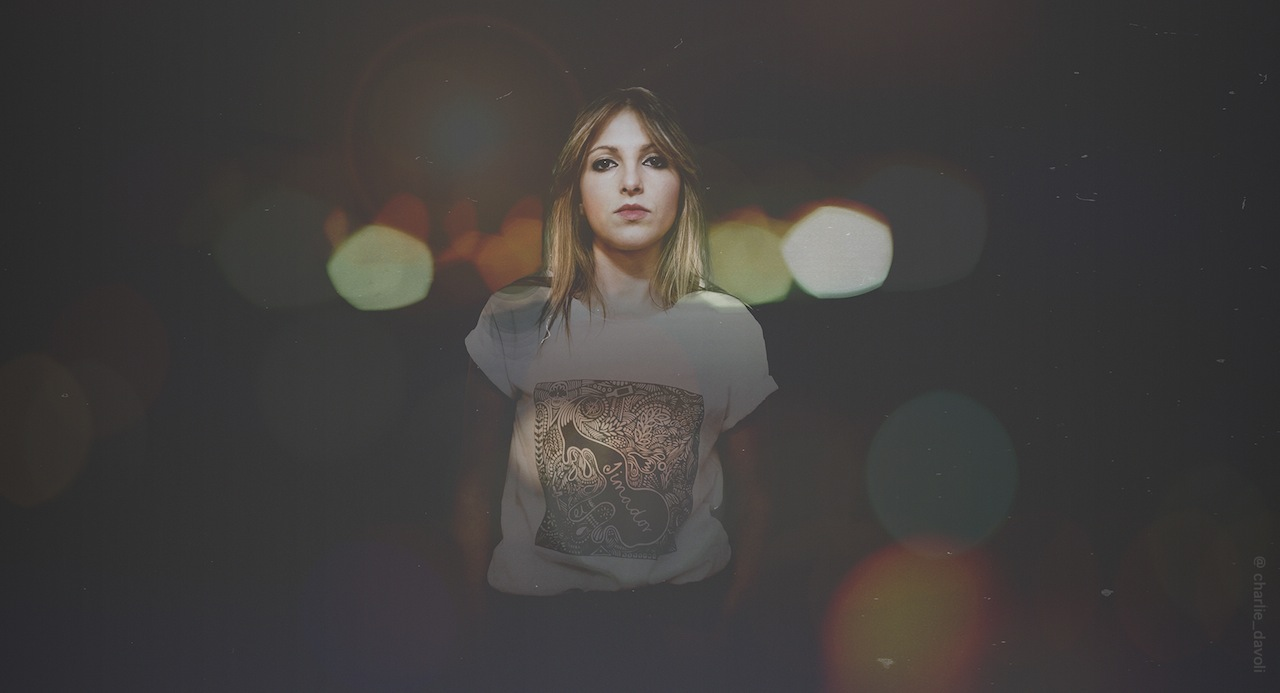

Background information
- Born: Matilde De Rubertis; 24 March 1982 (age 43); Lecce, Italy
- Genres: Indie pop; folk music; dream pop
- Occupations: Musician; sound engineer; producer; songwriter
- Instruments: Vocals; guitar; piano; drums; bass; synthetizer
- Years active: 2001–present
- Labels: Record Kicks; Cramps Record; Disastro Records; Morr Music; Production Dessinée; Loyal To Your Dreams; Elefant Records; Bad Panda Records

Matilde De Rubertis (born 24 March 1982), known professionally as Matilde Davoli, is an Italian indie-pop songwriter, producer and sound engineer.

Matilde was born in Lecce, and started her musical career in 2001 with the band Studiodavoli and after the 2006 she found another musical project Girl With The Gun with her friend and producer Populous. Her first solo album is called I'm Calling You From My Dreams and it was released for the art label Loyal To Your Dreams in June 2015. At the present she's working as a sound engineer at the recording studio Sudestudio.

== Discography ==
=== Studiodavoli ===
- Megalopolis (2004)
- Decibel For Dummies (2006)

=== Girl With The Gun ===
- S/T (2008)
- Ages (2014)

=== Solo discography ===
- I'm Calling You from My Dreams (2015)
- Home (2021)

=== Collaborations ===
- Giorgio Tuma – Uncolerd (Swing' n' Pop Around Rose) (2004)
- Populous – Queue for Love (2005)
- Giorgio Tuma – My Vocalese Funfair (2008)
- Indian Wells – Pause (2014)
- Giorgio Tuma – This Life Denied Me Your Love (2016)

== Sound engineer productions ==
- Thousands Millions – Rock Days (2010)
- Lucia Manca – S/T (2011)
- Life & Limb – S/T (2012)
- Indian Wells – Night Drops (2012)
- Gianluca De Rubertis – Autoritratti con oggetti (2012)
- Echopark – Trees (2013)
- Many Love Ska-Jazz – Dreamlike (2014)
- Indian Wells – Pause (2014)
- Girl with the Gun – Ages (2014)
- Matilde Davoli – I'm Calling You from My Dreams (2015)
- Laetitia Sadier – "Dry Fruit" (song, 2015)
- Delta Club – Fortitude EP (2016)
- Giorgio Tuma – The Life Denied Me Your Love (2016)
- Echopark – Ties (2017)
- Indian Wells – Where the World Ends (2017)
- I'm Not a Blonde – The Blonde Album (2018)
- Lucia Manca – Maledetto e benedetto (2018)
- Soul Island – Shards (2018)
