= Jack Carty (musician) =

Australian musician

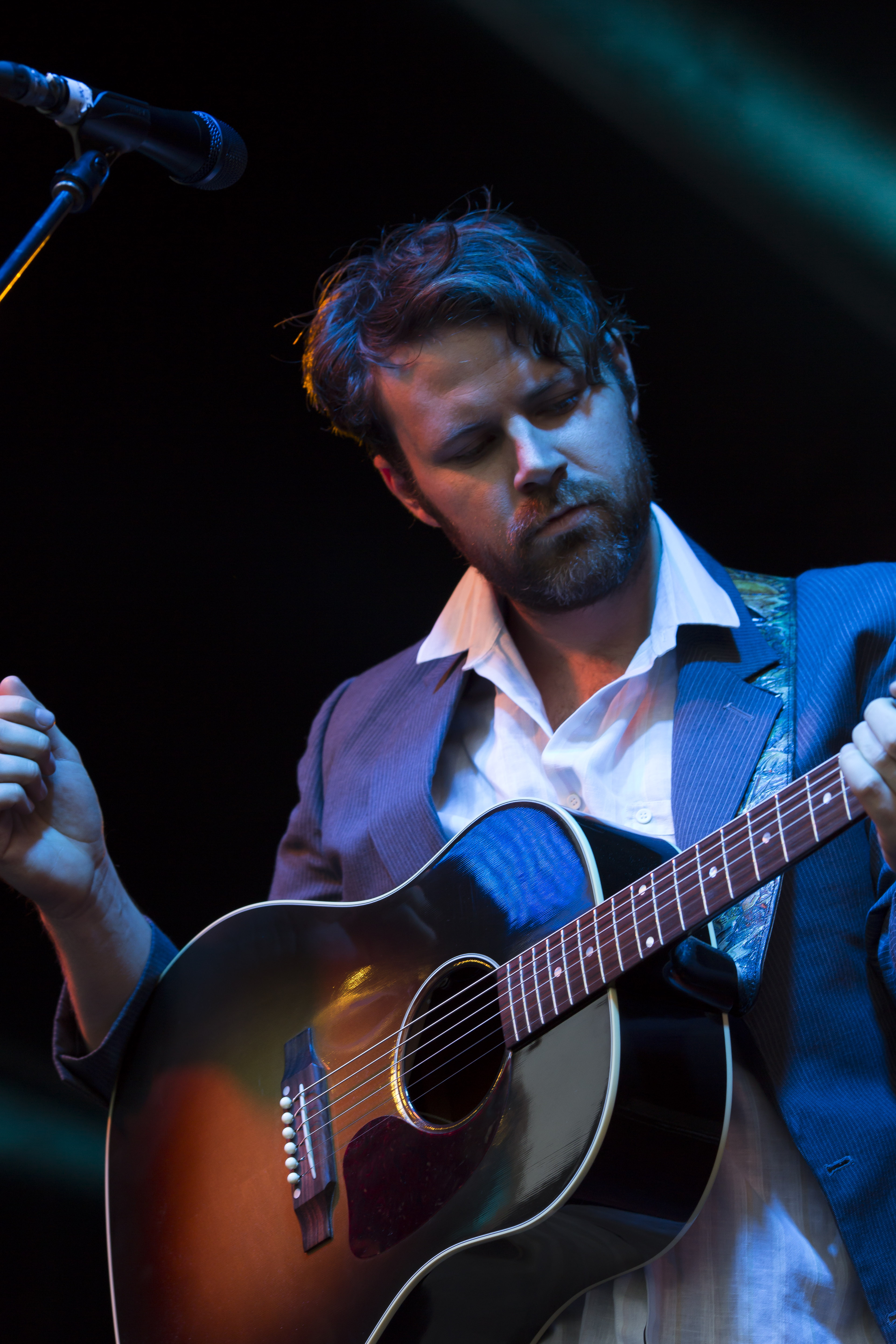
- March 2015

Background information
- Born: 20 April 1987 (age 39); Bellingen, NSW Australia
- Origin: Bellingen, NSW Australia
- Genre: Folk/indie/alt. country/rock
- Occupation: Musician/songwriter.
- Instruments: Vocals, guitar, piano.
- Years active: 2009 – Present
- Label: Gigpiglet/Inertia (Aus/NZ)
- Website: http://www.jackcarty.com

Jack Carty is an Australian musician and songwriter from Bellingen, New South Wales. He currently resides in Brisbane.

Though none of his releases to date have achieved a high level of commercial success, they have received critical acclaim in his home country of Australia from national press including: The Australian, The Weekend Australian and The Sydney Morning Herald, and Arts and Entertainment websites including: The Music, TheAUReview, Timber & Steel, FasterLouder, Beat, and Music Feeds.

Carty has toured in Australia, the United States and Canada, appearing at festivals such as: South By South West (SXSW), Canadian Music Week (CMW), Woodford Folk Festival, Queenscliff Music Festival (QMF), and Mullum Music Festival. Carty has supported artists including: Josh Pyke, Justin Townes Earle, Matt Corby, Katie Noonan, Robert Ellis, Ingrid Michaelson and Joshua Radin. Carty completed his own headline tours (the most recent being in March 2026 launching his album "In the Blue of the Day”.

== Albums and EPs ==
Carty has released 5 albums and 2 EP's
Albums:
2011: One Thousand Origami Birds
2012: Break Your Own Heart
2014: Esk
2016: Home State
2018: "Hospital Hill" the strings album was released as a collaborative project with musician Gus Gardiner.

E.P's:
2010 "Wine & Consequence"
2013 "The Predictable Crisis of Modern Life") through Sydney based independent record label "Gigpiglet Recordings" distributed in Australia and New Zealand through Inertia Music Pty Ltd.

== Honors and awards ==
In 2010 Carty won "Acoustic Singer-Songwriter of the Year" at the National MusicOZ Awards.
