= The Little Flames =

English indie rock band

- Origin: The Wirral, England
- Genres: Indie rock; garage rock
- Years active: 2004–2007
- Label: Deltasonic
- Members: Eva Petersen; Joe Edwards; Mat Gregory; Miles Kane; Greg Mighall
- Past members: Denis Shiel

The Little Flames were an indie rock band from Hoylake, England. The band consisted of Eva Petersen (Vocals), Greg Mighall (Drums), Joe Edwards (Bass), Miles Kane (Guitar) and Mat Gregory (Guitar). Their music can best be described as indie rock with some 1960s inspiration, slightly similar to The Coral. Fans of the band include Arctic Monkeys, who could be seen wearing Little Flames T-shirts at concerts at the Astoria in London. The band has played shows with bands such as the Arctic Monkeys, The Coral, The Dead 60s and The Zutons.

The band's song "Put Your Dukes Up John" was covered by the Arctic Monkeys for the B-side of their single, "Leave Before the Lights Come On".

== History ==
The Little Flames formed in December 2004, after members of the band were introduced to each other by dub and punk DJ Babylon Fox. The band's run was short lived, and split up on 15 May 2007 prior to the release of their debut album, which was not released until 2016. Miles Kane, Joe Edwards and Greg Mighall went on to form The Rascals, whilst Eva Petersen is pursuing a solo career. Mat Gregory, who was the main songwriter for The Little Flames, continues to work as an artist, writer and musician. Miles Kane has since left The Rascals to pursue a solo career. The Day is Not Today was released by Deltasonic Records in 2016.

== Discography ==
=== Albums ===
- The Day Is Not Today (2007 - Unreleased until 2016)

=== Singles ===
- "Goodbye Little Rose" (2004)
- "Put Your Dukes Up John" (2005)
- "Isobella" (2007)
