= The Best of Missing Persons =

Greatest hits album by Missing Persons
- Released: 1987
- Recorded: 1980–1986
- Genre: New wave, synth-pop
- Length: 60:26
- Label: Capitol
- Producer: Ken Scott, Terry Bozzio, Bruce Swedien, Jeff Bova, Bernard Edwards

Missing Persons chronology
Color in Your Life (1986)	The Best of Missing Persons (1987)	Late Nights Early Days (1997)

Professional ratings
Review scores
Source	Rating
Allmusic	4.5/5 stars

The Best of Missing Persons is a greatest hits album by the American new wave band Missing Persons, released in 1987. The first four tracks make up the entire Missing Persons EP, released in 1982 (Capitol Records DLP-15001). The remaining songs are from the band's first three studio albums and a non-album recording, their cover of "Hello, I Love You" originally by The Doors, which was included in the first pressing of the Missing Persons EP (1980), later included as a B-side to the "Words" single.

== Track listing ==
No.	Title	Writer(s)	Origin	Length
1.	"Words"	Terry Bozzio, Warren Cuccurullo	Missing Persons EP (1980) & Spring Session M (1982)	4:29
2.	"Destination Unknown"	Dale Bozzio, T. Bozzio, Cuccurullo	Missing Persons EP & Spring Session M	3:35
3.	"I Like Boys"	T. Bozzio, Cuccurullo	Missing Persons EP	2:39
4.	"Mental Hopscotch"	T. Bozzio, Cuccurullo	Missing Persons EP	3:16
5.	"Hello, I Love You"	Jim Morrison, Ray Manzarek, Robby Krieger, John Densmore	Missing Persons EP & B-side of "Words" single (1982)	2:19
6.	"Windows"	D. Bozzio, T. Bozzio	Spring Session M	5:02
7.	"It Ain't None of Your Business"	T. Bozzio, Cuccurullo	Spring Session M	2:57
8.	"Walking in L.A."	T. Bozzio	Spring Session M	4:00
9.	"Tears"	D. Bozzio, T. Bozzio	Spring Session M	4:22
10.	"Bad Streets"	T. Bozzio	Spring Session M	3:43
11.	"Give"	D. Bozzio, T. Bozzio, Cuccurullo, Patrick O'Hearn	Rhyme & Reason (1984)	4:56
12.	"Right Now"	D. Bozzio, T. Bozzio	Rhyme & Reason	3:31
13.	"Color in Your Life"	D. Bozzio, T. Bozzio, Cuccurullo, O'Hearn	Color in Your Life (1986)	4:59
14.	"I Can't Think About Dancin'"	D. Bozzio, T. Bozzio, Cuccurullo, O'Hearn	Color in Your Life	5:43
15.	"No Secrets"	D. Bozzio, T. Bozzio, Cuccurullo, O'Hearn	Color in Your Life	4:28
Total length:				60:26

== Personnel ==
Missing Persons

- Dale Bozzio – vocals
- Terry Bozzio – vocals, keyboards, synthesizers, drums, percussion
- Warren Cuccurullo – guitar, vocals
- Patrick O'Hearn – electric & synthesized bass, keyboards, synthesizers
- Chuck Wild – synthesizer, keyboard (except for Color in Your Life tracks)
