= Lost Tracks (Missing Persons album) =

Compilation album by Missing Persons
- Released: 2002
- Genre: New wave
- Length: 50:40
- Label: One Way Records

Missing Persons chronology
Late Nights Early Days (1997)	Lost Tracks (2002)	Missing in Action (2014)

Lost Tracks is a compilation album by American new wave band Missing Persons, released in 2002. Compiled by former Missing Persons guitarist Warren Cuccurullo, it contains a selection of previously unreleased studio and live recordings.

It was rated three stars by AllMusic.

== Track listing ==
1. "Mental Hopscotch" (Acid Samba Remix) – 6:26
2. "Dark and Dangerous Guy" – 4:31*
3. "Bad Streets" (live) – 3:41
4. "Action Reaction" – 2:50
5. "Throw Money" – 1:49*
6. "Words" (live) – 4:39
7. "None of Your Business" (live) – 3:29
8. "Face to Face" (live) – 3:01
9. "Rock 'n' Roll Suspension (live) – 2:46
10. "Give" (live) – 5:03
11. "Hair and Kiss and Makeup" – 3:40*
12. "Dark and Dangerous Guy" – 4:21*
13. "Centerfold Girl" – 2:00*
14. "On Vacation" (live) – 3:03*
- unreleased songs recorded for the 2001 reunion

== Personnel ==
- Dale Bozzio - vocals
- Terry Bozzio - synthesizer, guitar, drums, keyboard, vocals
- Warren Cuccurullo - guitar, vocals
- Patrick O'Hearn - synthesizer, bass, electric bass
- Chuck Wild - synthesizer, keyboard
