= Late Nights Early Days =

Live album by Missing Persons
- Released: 1997
- Recorded: 1980/1981
- Genre: New wave, synthpop
- Label: Sumthing Else Music Works (North America), Bandai Music (Japan)

Missing Persons chronology
The Best of Missing Persons (1987)	Late Nights Early Days (1997)	Lost Tracks (2002)

Late Nights Early Days is a live album by American new wave band Missing Persons, released in 1997. Identified as an "important document of '80s pop" by AllMusic reviewer Tom Schulte, the album features a 1981 live concert, as well as a previously unreleased studio track from 1980, entitled "Action Reaction".

== Track listing ==
1. "Action Reaction" – 2:52
2. "Mental Hopscotch" – 3:06
3. "Noticeable Ones" – 3:35
4. "Words" – 4:22
5. "Destination Unknown" – 3:21
6. "Here and Now" – 3:16
7. "I Like Boys" – 2:54
8. "Hello, I Love You" – 2:27
9. "No Way Out" – 3:19
10. "Windows" – 4:55
11. "U.S. Drag" – 3:34
12. "Walking in L.A." – 4:01

== Personnel ==
- Dale Bozzio – lead vocals
- Terry Bozzio – drums, backing vocals
- Warren Cuccurullo – guitars, backing vocals
- Chuck Wild – keyboards
- Patrick O'Hearn – bass, synth bass
