= Color in Your Life =

Studio album by Missing Persons
- Released: July 29, 1986
- Length: 41:48
- Label: Capitol
- Producer: Bernard Edwards

Missing Persons chronology
Rhyme & Reason (1984)	Color in Your Life (1986)	The Best of Missing Persons (1987)

Color in Your Life is the third studio album by American band Missing Persons, released in 1986. It was the band's last studio album with the original line-up, with the sole exception of Chuck Wild, who left the group in 1985 and was not replaced. The album was produced by Bernard Edwards.

== Critical reception ==
Professional ratings
Review scores
Source	Rating
AllMusic	2/5 stars
The Philadelphia Inquirer	1/4 stars

The Philadelphia Inquirer panned the "thoroughly cheesy vocalist Dale Bozzio." The Los Angeles Times noted that the album "features sudden screeching guitar solos slicing through the electronic haze ... those moments come out of nowhere and disappear just as quickly, leaving only that incessant dance beat." The Dallas Morning News called Color in Your Life "a surprisingly feeble effort, filled with colorless, uninspired music." The Omaha World-Herald deemed "I Can't Think About Dancin'" "obnoxiously repetitive."

== Track listing ==
All songs by Missing Persons (Dale Bozzio, Terry Bozzio, Warren Cuccurullo, and Patrick O'Hearn), except where noted.

1. "Color in Your Life" – 5:00
2. "I Can't Think About Dancin'" – 5:16
3. "No Secrets" – 4:29
4. "Flash of Love" – 4:15
5. "Go Against the Flow" – 5:54
6. "Boy I Say to You" – 4:38
7. "Come Back for More" – 3:41
8. "Face to Face" – 3:33
9. "We Don't Know Love at All" – 5:02

CD bonus tracks

1. "Hot to Cold" [*] (D. Bozzio, T. Bozzio, W. Cuccurullo) – 3:40
2. "It's a Must" [*] (D. Bozzio, T. Bozzio, Cuccurullo) – 4:34
3. "Words" [live 1981] (T. Bozzio, Cuccurullo) – 4:23
4. "Destination Unknown" [live 1981] (D. Bozzio, T. Bozzio, Cuccurullo) – 3:20
5. "Mental Hopscotch" [live 1981] (T. Bozzio, Cuccurullo) – 3:04
6. "Hello, I Love You" [live 1981] (John Densmore, Robbie Krieger, Ray Manzarek, Jim Morrison) – 2:30

* previously unreleased

CD bonus tracks (2021 Rubellan Remasters edition)

1. "Hot to Cold" (D. Bozzio, T. Bozzio, W. Cuccurullo)
2. "It's a Must" (D. Bozzio, T. Bozzio, Cuccurullo)
3. "I Can't Think About Dancin'" (single version)
4. "I Can't Think About Dancin'" (extended version)
5. "I Can't Think About Dancin'" (dub version)

== Personnel ==
- Dale Bozzio – vocals
- Terry Bozzio – synthesizer, percussion, drums, vocals
- Warren Cuccurullo – guitar, vocals
- Patrick O'Hearn – synthesizer, bass, vocals

Additional personnel

- Carl Carwell – background vocals
- Roy Galloway – background vocals
- Mark Isham – brass
- Robert O'Hearn – synthesizer
- Phil Perry – background vocals

Production

- Producer: Bernard Edwards
- Engineers: Josh Abbey, Sabrina Buchanek, Bill Freesh, Casey McMackin
- Assistant engineer: Jon Ingoldsby
- Mixing: Michael Barbiero, Victor Deyglio, Bernard Edwards, Steve Thompson
- Mastering: Kit Watkins
- Programming: Jeff Bova
- Overdubs: Mark Isham
- Vocal arrangement: Terry Bozzio
- Liner notes: Ken Sharp

== Charts ==
Chart (1986)	Peak position
US Billboard 200	86
