= Destination Unknown (song) =

1982 single by Missing Persons

Single by Missing Persons

from the album Spring Session M
- Released: September 1982
- Recorded: 1980
- Studio: UMRK (Los Angeles)
- Genre: Rock; new wave
- Length: 3:40
- Label: Capitol
- Songwriters: Dale Bozzio; Terry Bozzio; Warren Cuccurullo
- Producer: Ken Scott

Missing Persons singles chronology
"Windows" (1982)	"Destination Unknown" (1982)	"Walking in L.A." (1983)

"Destination Unknown" is a song by American band Missing Persons. It was written by Dale Bozzio, Terry Bozzio, and Warren Cuccurullo with production by Ken Scott at Frank Zappa's Utility Muffin Research Kitchen studio. Originally released on the band's self-titled EP (1980), the song was released as a single in September 1982 and appeared on their debut studio album Spring Session M (1982).

In the United States, it peaked at No. 42 on the Billboard Hot 100 chart and No. 40 on the Cashbox Top 100 in November 1982.

== Release history ==
Country	Date	Format	Label	Ref.
United States	September 1982	7"	Capitol	

== Charts ==
Chart performance for "Destination Unknown"
Chart (1982–1983)	Peak; position
Australia	89
US Billboard Hot 100	42
US Cash Box Top 100	40

== Cover versions and media appearances ==
- The Smashing Pumpkins covered the song as one of several B-sides for their single "Bullet with Butterfly Wings". It later appeared on their 1996 box set The Aeroplane Flies High.
- Replicants recorded a cover of this song for their 1995 self-titled album.
- Erectus Monotone covered the song on the 1992 compilation album Tannis Root Presents: Freedom of Choice.
- Joan Jett and the Blackhearts covered the song for the soundtrack of the 2009 film Endless Bummer.
- The 1998 Alvin and the Chipmunks album The A-Files: Alien Songs includes a cover of the song by the Chipettes.
