= KROQ Top 106.7 Countdowns =

End of the year countdown on the Los Angeles radio station KROQ

KROQ Top 106.7 Countdown chart toppers
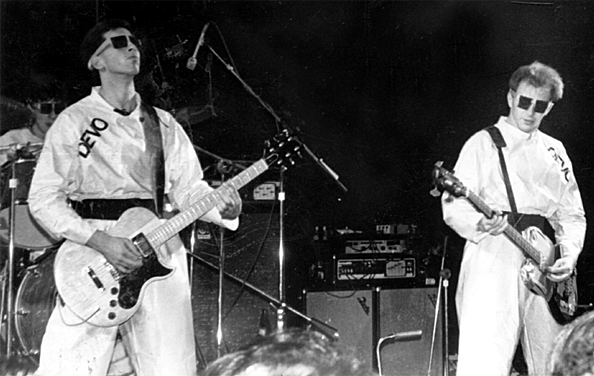
Devo

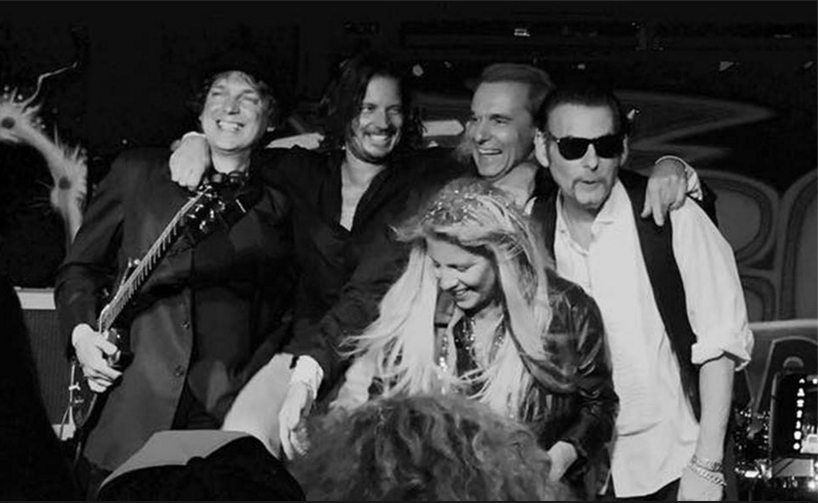
Missing Persons

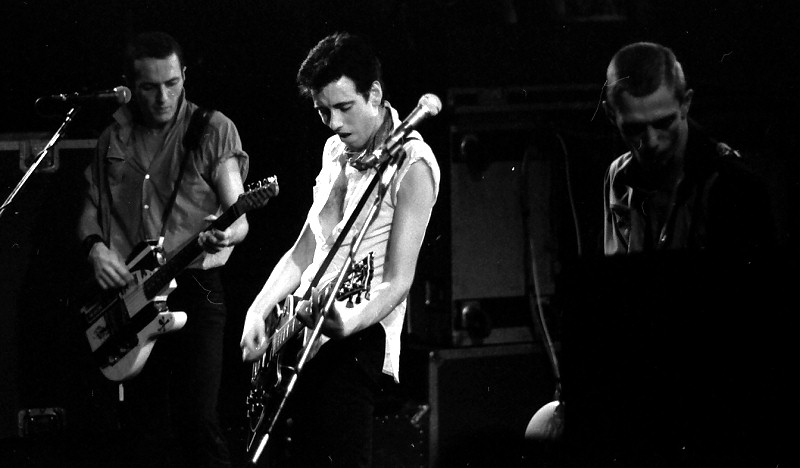
The Clash

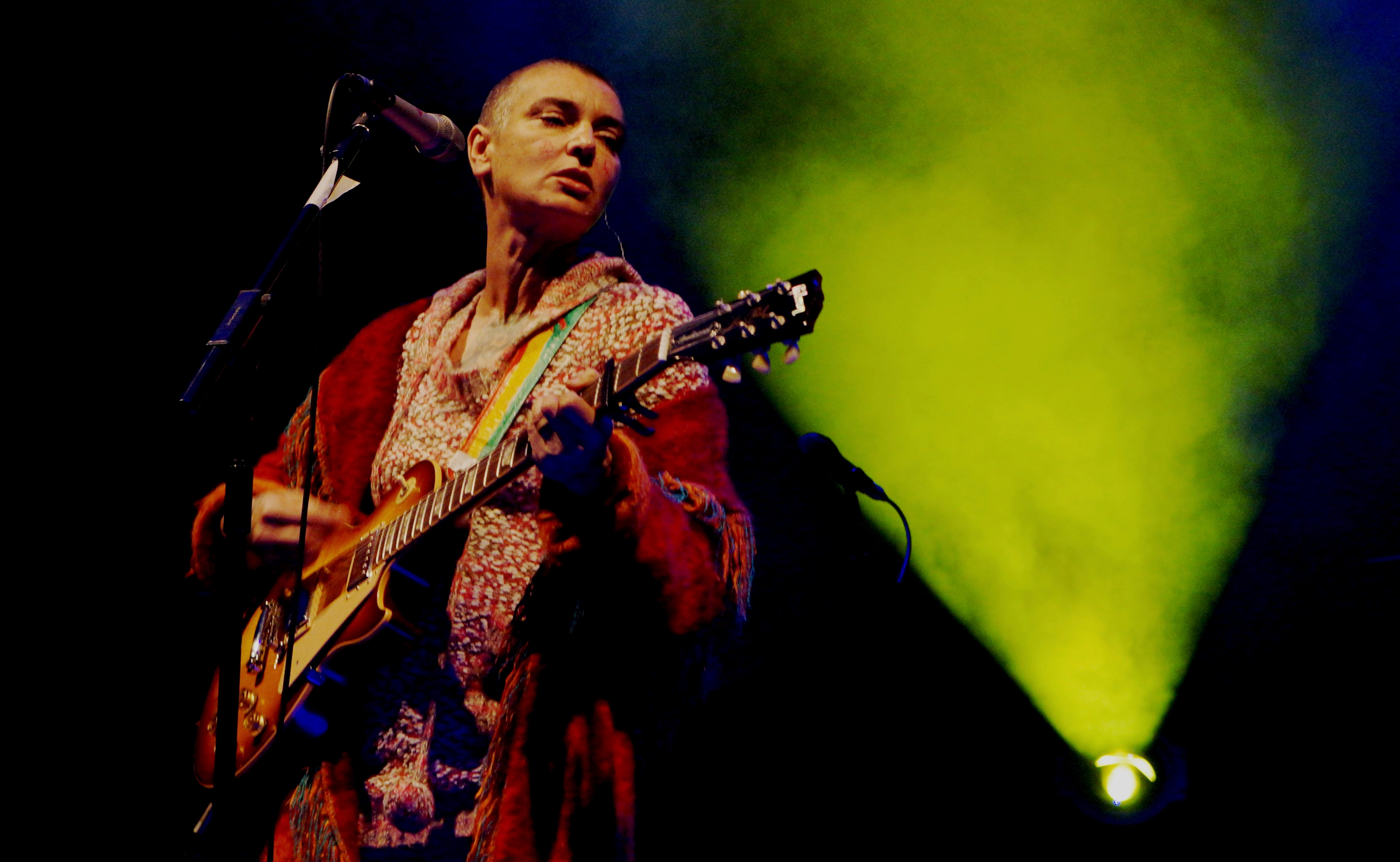
Sinéad O'Connor

The KROQ Top 106.7 Countdowns is an end-of-year countdown that lists the top "106.7" songs on the Los Angeles station KROQ as voted by listeners. The countdown started in 1980, and ran every year until 2009.^{[b]} Since 2009, the list has been compiled by fans from playlist data.

In the late 1970s and early 1980s, KROQ's proximity to Hollywood and the Los Angeles music scene gave it a unique place in the development of the punk, new wave and alternative rock genres. In its heyday, KROQ was considered the most powerful radio station in the world. It was the top-rated station in the Los Angeles metropolitan area, and its "ROQ of the 80s" format was copied nationwide. Its renegade roots, and willingness to experiment, came along at the same time as the birth of punk and new wave. The choices made by the station and its staff had a worldwide impact. This is reflected in the annual list of most popular songs.

The end of year countdown was the first among the station's "lists". Among others released are the "List Of 106.7 Biggest KROQ Bands" and "Flashback 500" or "Firecracker 500" (presenting the 500 most popular songs). In April 2020, the station released a COVID Quarantine edition of the "Top 106.7 Songs of All Time", with Everlong by the Foo Fighters topping the list.

== Countdowns by year ==
KROQ Top 106.7 Countdowns
Year	Number 1 Song	Artist	Reference
1980	Whip It	Devo	^{[b]}
1981	Mental Hopscotch	Missing Persons	^{[a]}
1982	Rock the Casbah	The Clash	^{[a]}
1983	Is There Something I Should Know?	Duran Duran	^{[a]}
1984	Relax	Frankie Goes to Hollywood	^{[a]}
1985	Shake the Disease	Depeche Mode	^{[a]}
1986	Suburbia	Pet Shop Boys	^{[a]}
1987	Just Like Heaven	The Cure	^{[a]}
1988	Route 66	Depeche Mode	^{[a]}
1989	Love Song	The Cure	^{[a]}
1990	Nothing Compares 2 U	Sinéad O'Connor	^{[a]}
1991	Losing My Religion	R.E.M.	^{[a]}
1992	Under the Bridge	Red Hot Chili Peppers	^{[a]}
1993	Plush	Stone Temple Pilots	^{[a]}
1994	Longview	Green Day	^{[a]}
1995	Lightning Crashes	Live	^{[a]}
1996	Down	311	^{[a]}
1997	Wrong Way	Sublime	^{[a]}
1998	Intergalactic	Beastie Boys	^{[a]}
1999	What's My Age Again?	Blink-182	^{[a]}
2000	Last Resort	Papa Roach	^{[a]}
2001	In the End	Linkin Park	^{[a]}
2002	Fell in Love with a Girl	The White Stripes	^{[a]}
2003	Seven Nation Army	The White Stripes	^{[a]}
2004	Float On	Modest Mouse	^{[a]}
2005	Boulevard of Broken Dreams	Green Day	^{[a]}
2006	Dani California	Red Hot Chili Peppers	^{[a]}
2007	The Pretender	Foo Fighters	^{[a]}
2008	You're Gonna Go Far, Kid	The Offspring	^{[a]}
2009	Use Somebody	Kings of Leon	^{[a]}
2010	Lisztomania	Phoenix	^{[a]}
2011	Pumped Up Kicks	Foster the People	^{[a]}
2012	We Are Young	Fun.	^{[a]}
2013	Radioactive	Imagine Dragons	^{[b]}

== Lack of female artist representation ==
Female artists
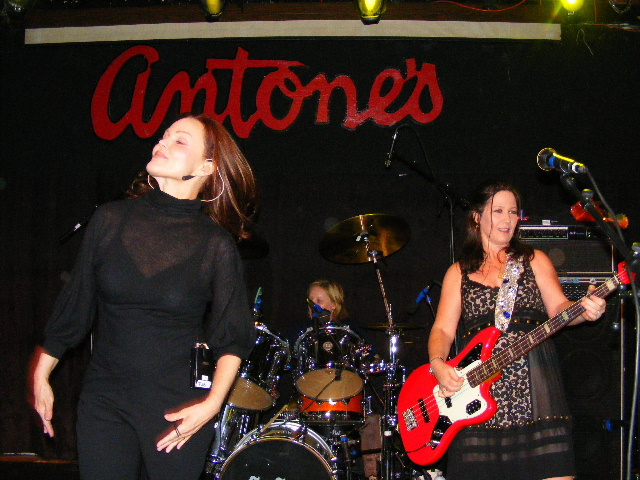
The Go-Gos

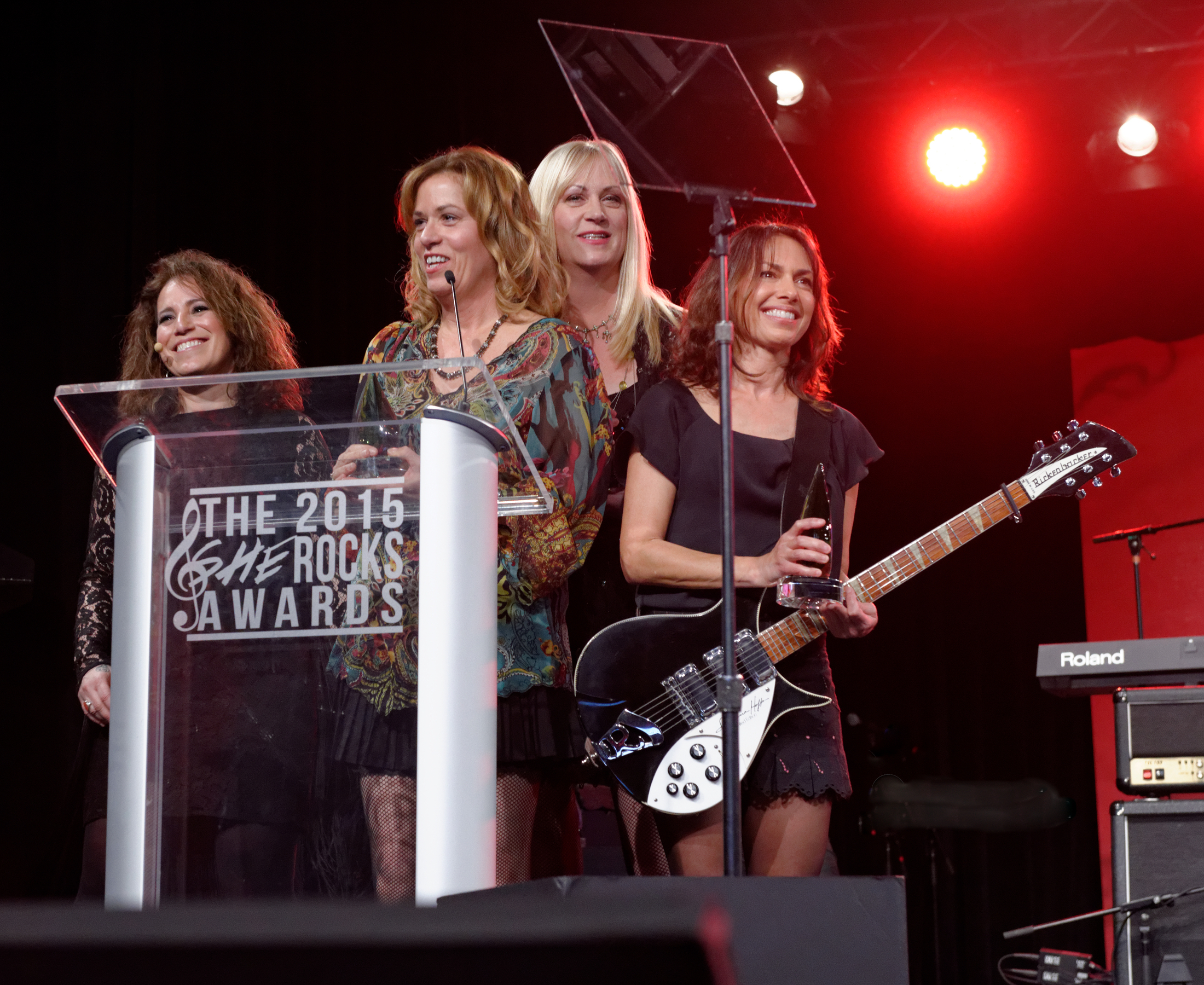
The Bangles

Over the years, bands like the Go-Gos and the Bangles made the list, but didn't make the top spot. Missing Persons, fronted by Dale Bozzio, topped the chart in 1981, the chart's second year.^{[a]}^{[b]} However, since its inception, the number of female artists has decreased over the years, with Sinéad O'Connor being the only woman, or female act, to top the countdown.^{[a]}^{[b]} This is the same phenomena seen on the Billboard's Alternative Songs chart that went seventeen years without a female solo act topping the chart from 1996 to 2013.

Over the years, KROQ's Weenie Roast has also faced allegations that it does not pay enough attention to gender equity.

== See also ==
- Triple J Hottest 100
- Women in rock
