= Riot in English =

Studio album by Dale Bozzio
- Released: March 4, 1988
- Recorded: 1987
- Studio: Metropolis, Los Angeles, California; Sunset Sound, Hollywood, California; Conway, Hollywood, California; Paisley Park, Chanhassen, Minnesota
- Genre: Dance-pop; new wave
- Length: 40:25
- Label: Paisley Park
- Producer: Robert Brookins; Attala Zane Giles

Dale Bozzio chronology
Riot in English (1988)	New Wave Sessions (2007)

Singles from Riot In English
- 1. "Simon Simon" Released: 1987; 2. "Riot in English" Released: 1988; 3. "Overtime" Released: 1988

Riot in English is the debut studio album by American singer Dale Bozzio. It was released on March 4, 1988, by Paisley Park Records. Bozzio began working on the album after her divorce from Terry Bozzio and the break-up of their band Missing Persons. She got signed to Prince's record label Paisley Park Records and collaborated with Robert Brookins and Attala Zane Giles on the album while co-writing most of the songs. Musically, the songs took a slightly different direction than her work with Missing Persons, incorporating more dance-pop sound rather than new wave music.

Three singles were released from the album. The lead single "Simon Simon" reached the dance charts, peaking inside the top forty on the Billboard Dance Club Songs chart. However, the following singles "Riot in English" and "Overtime" failed to chart.

== Critical reception ==
Professional ratings
Review scores
Source	Rating
AllMusic	3.5/5 stars

Joe Viglione from AllMusic praised Bozzio's lyrics, saying that "she knows how to pull a chic cliché and envelope it" and also added that Prince gave her "the opportunity to prove she's as charming on record as she is in person and a talent in her own right apart from Missing Persons". Trouser Press noted that "the commercial dance music ... plays up the flexibility of Dale's voice, but the pre-fab cookie-cutter material and arrangements come as quite a disappointment after the stylistic invention of her former group."

== Track listing ==
No.	Title	Writer(s)	Producer(s)	Length
1.	"Simon Simon"	Dale Bozzio; Robert Brookins	Brookins	4:34
2.	"Giddi Up Baby - Be Mine"	Bozzio; Brookins	Brookins	4:17
3.	"Overtime"	Brookins; Gordon Jones; Tony Haynes	Brookins	4:50
4.	"So Strong"	Prince	Prince	4:28
5.	"Love Is Hard Work"	Bozzio; Attala Zane Giles	Giles	3:40
6.	"Riot in English"	Bozzio; Brookins	Brookins	4:24
7.	"He's So Typical"	Bozzio; Brookins	Brookins	5:19
8.	"Ouch That Feels Good"	Bozzio; Brookins	Brookins	5:00
9.	"The Perfect Stranger"	Bozzio; Giles	Giles	3:53
Total length:				40:25

== Credits and personnel ==
- Dale Bozzio – vocals, songwriter, design
- Robert Brookins – producer, songwriter, keyboards, drums, percussion, backing vocals
- Attala Zane Giles – producer, songwriter, keyboards, drums, percussion, backing vocals
- Tony Haynes – songwriter
- Prince – songwriter
- Lovely Anglin – backing vocals
- Carl Carwell – backing vocals
- David Cochrane – backing vocals
- Ray Grady – backing vocals
- Keith John – backing vocals
- Gordon Jones – backing vocals, songwriter
- Lenward L. Holness II – backing vocals, design
- Roland West – backing vocals
- Kevin Chokan – guitar
- Bobby Gonzales – guitar
- Michael Landau – guitar
- Coke Johnson – engineer, mixing
- Erik Zobler – engineer
- Mitch Gibson – engineer
- Susan Rogers – engineer
- Jeff Goodman – assistant engineer
- Jimmy Preziosi – assistant engineer
- Steve Ford – assistant engineer
- Mick Guzauski – mixing
- Tommy Vicari – mixing
- Brian Gardner – mastering
- Cynthia Moore – photography
- Doug Powell – design
- Dina Branhan – production coordinator
- Karen E. Wood – production coordinator

Credits adapted from the album's liner notes.
