= Warren Cuccurullo =

American musician (born 1956)

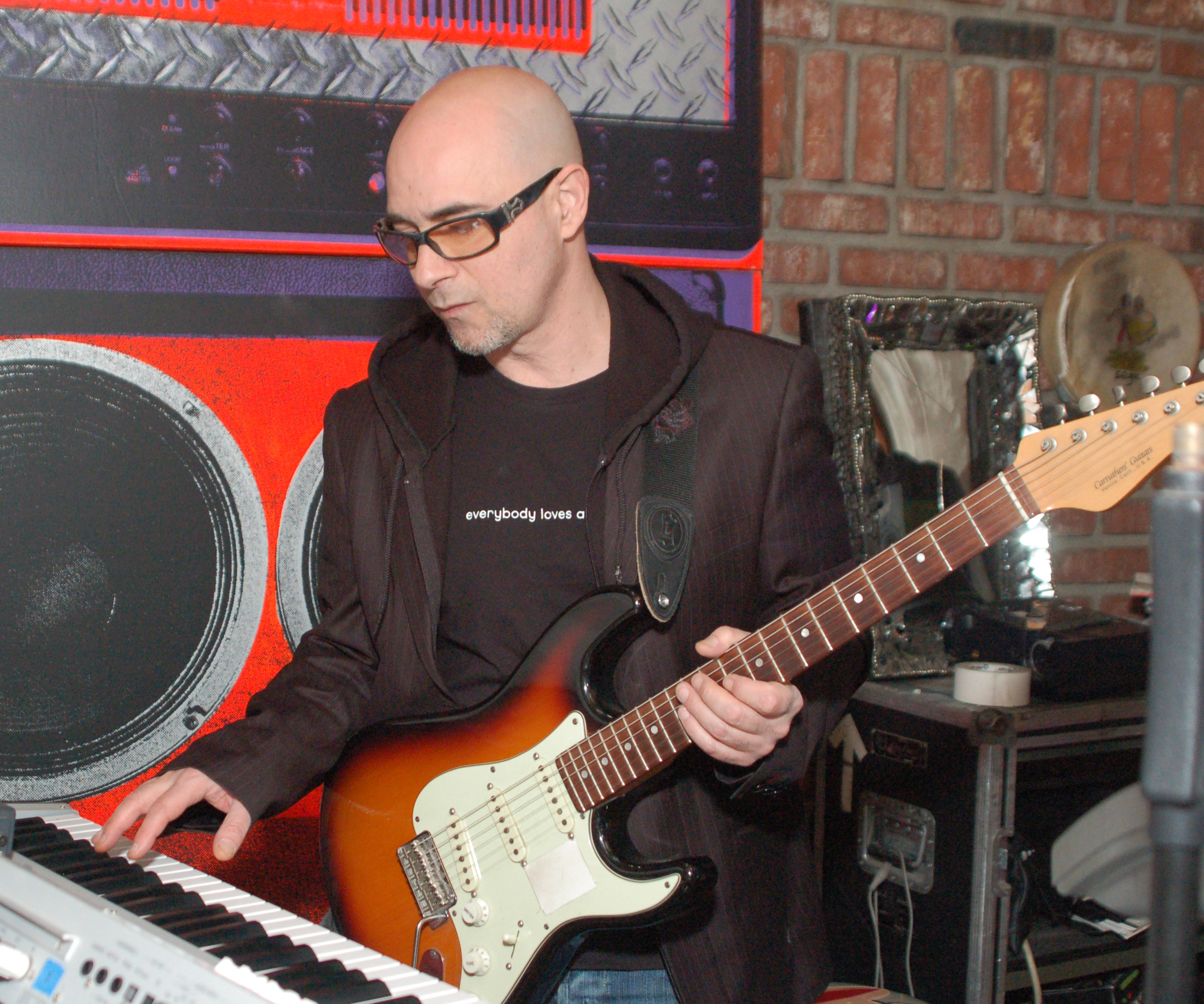
- Cuccurullo performing in 2009

Background information
- Born: Warren Bruce Cuccurullo; December 8, 1956 (age 69); Brooklyn, New York, U.S.
- Genres: Alternative rock; electronica; synth-pop; progressive rock; electro-industrial; experimental rock; ambient
- Occupations: Musician; songwriter; bodybuilder; restaurant owner
- Instruments: Guitar; bass; keyboards; drums; vocals
- Years active: 1977–present
- Formerly of: Missing Persons; Duran Duran; TV Mania; Frank Zappa
- Website: warrencuccurullo.com

Warren Bruce Cuccurullo (born December 8, 1956) is an American musician, songwriter, restaurant owner, and former bodybuilder who first worked with Frank Zappa during the 1970s. He was also a founding member of Missing Persons in the 1980s. In 1989, Cuccurullo joined Duran Duran, becoming a long-term member of the band until 2001. In 2022, he was inducted into the Rock and Roll Hall of Fame as a member of Duran Duran.

== Personal life ==
Warren Bruce Cuccurullo is the son of Jerry and Ellen Cuccurullo, the oldest child of four. He has two brothers, Jerry and Robert and a sister, Stephanie. His Italian-American heritage has its roots in Nocera Inferiore in Campania, Italy, and he also has some Greek ancestry. He grew up in the Canarsie neighborhood of Brooklyn, and began playing drums and guitar as a young child. He graduated from Canarsie High School in 1974.

Cuccurullo has one adopted child, Mayko Cuccurullo (born 1983), who lives in Rio de Janeiro, Brazil and is the son of Warren's former longtime girlfriend Claudia Bueno. Mayko is featured in the Duran Duran video "Breath After Breath", filmed in Argentina in 1993 and contributed some minor vocal work on the N'Liten Up project.

Cuccurullo returned to the United States in 2001 and lives in Venice, California. His current focus is on film score compositions.

== 1977–1980: The Zappa years ==
In his teen years, Cuccurullo became a devoted fan of Frank Zappa and began traveling to every show within 500 miles of his Brooklyn home. During the mid-1970s, he befriended several members of Zappa's band, including Terry Bozzio and Patrick O'Hearn. Over the next three years, he appeared with the band on stage at a couple of shows as well as in the 1979 Zappa film Baby Snakes (filmed October 1977). He impressed Frank Zappa by knowing the guitar parts to every Zappa song in the catalog, including the strangest sounds and most bizarre time signatures.

In December 1978, at the age of 22, Cuccurullo was invited to audition as a guitarist for Zappa's new road band, in which several members were replaced (including Bozzio and O'Hearn). Several shows on the early 1979 "Human Jukebox" European/Asian tour were recorded for Zappa's live albums. After the tour, Cuccurullo returned to the studio with Zappa to work on the Joe's Garage albums, for which he provided rhythm guitar and several vocal parts. Terry Bozzio's wife Dale Bozzio also contributed vocal parts to the album. Cuccurullo and Dale Bozzio began writing songs together, and eventually they persuaded Terry Bozzio that the three of them should launch their own band.

Cuccurullo is name-checked four times on Zappa's Joe's Garage, first by (Dale Bozzio's character) Mary in "Catholic Girls", by Zappa (in character as Larry) in "Crew Slut", when reassuring Mary, "of course I'll introduce you to Warren!", in the track "Sy Borg" when Ike Willis sings "little leather cap and trousers – they look so gay... Warren just bought some," and once again by Zappa during "A Little Green Rosetta" 'Then everybody moves to New York and goes to a party with Warren. hey!'

== 1980–1986: The Missing Persons years ==
In 1980, Cuccurullo and the two Bozzios formed Missing Persons, recording a 4-song EP called Missing Persons with session musicians, including future keyboardist Chuck Wild. They then toured to promote the EP and appeared in the movie Lunch Wagon. By 1981, the group had added fellow Zappa alumnus Patrick O'Hearn, and Chuck Wild had become an official bandmember. Two years of hard work led to a signing with Capitol Records in 1982, the release of the album Spring Session M, and the subsequent success of Missing Persons on radio and MTV. The singles "Mental Hopscotch", "Destination Unknown", "Walking in L.A.", "Words", and "Windows" all met with success. They appeared at the three-day Southern California concert, the US Festival in May 1983.

In 1984, Cuccurullo invented a new type of guitar he called the "Missing Link", and used it on the experimental album Rhyme & Reason (1984). The band followed up with the more conventional Color in Your Life in June 1986, but during the short-lived promotional tour, increasing tensions between then-husband and wife Terry and Dale Bozzio led to the end of the tour and the band.

On his own again, Cuccurullo began recording some music in his bedroom that was eventually released on his solo album Machine Language.

== 1986–2001: The Duran Duran years ==
Missing Persons shared their label Capitol Records with British band Duran Duran. As Missing Persons fell apart, Bozzio and O'Hearn were approached by Duran Duran guitarist Andy Taylor in Los Angeles for work on a solo album. In this way, Cuccurullo learned that Taylor did not intend to rejoin Duran Duran in England to work on their next album, even before the rest of Duran Duran knew. Cuccurullo sent a tape and a request for an audition, but was turned down, with some puzzlement.

As it became clear that neither enticements nor lawsuits would get Taylor back in the studio, Duran Duran hired Cuccurullo as a session guitarist to complete the album Notorious. He went on to tour with the band, and returned to contribute his increasingly experimental guitar work to the album Big Thing. At the end of the grueling ten-month Big Thing world tour (in June 1989), Cuccurullo was made an official member of the band, and moved to London. Shifting record label politics and the unsuccessful album Liberty almost derailed the band, but after Cuccurullo offered them the use of his home studio (named "Privacy") in Battersea, Duran Duran was able to shift to a more comfortable and controlled music-making style.

Cuccurullo's songwriting, guitar skills and driving personality contributed to the band's return to fame with 1993's Wedding Album. He earned co-writing credits on the hit singles "Ordinary World" and "Come Undone", although the lyrics were written by Simon Le Bon. He created new arrangements for many of the band's old hits for the acoustic-flavored tour that followed, as well as arranging full acoustic pieces for the piano and six-piece string section that performed with them on the MTV Unplugged show. After Frank Zappa's death in December 1993, Cuccurullo performed the instrumental guitar piece "Watermelon in Easter Hay" (from the Joe's Garage album) in his honor at several Duran Duran shows.

Tentative plans for a Missing Persons reunion in 1994 were shelved over remaining tensions between former band members.

Cuccurullo and keyboardist Nick Rhodes continued to hold Duran Duran together during the band's lean times in the 1990s. The covers album Thank You (1995) was an attempt to keep the peace among band members who had increasing trouble writing music together. Medazzaland (1997) and Pop Trash (2000)—written after the departure of bassist John Taylor and Duran Duran's separation from Capitol Records—featured mostly new Cuccurullo/Rhodes songs and reworked TV Mania material, but failed to dent the charts even though the band sold out multiple nights in most cities on the 2000/2001 tour.

In early 2001, Cuccurullo was asked to leave the band so that the original members of Duran Duran could reunite. At first the split was amicable, hingeing on a financial settlement which granted him compensation from the band's forthcoming reunion album (to which he was not expected to contribute). Two years later relations soured considerably during the reunited band's American tour when he was asked by management not to attend the Los Angeles show after the band had invited him (no reason was given), and he began confirming some of the rumors that had spread about the 2001 split. Cuccurullo claimed that he was fired from Duran Duran by letter because Rhodes and Le Bon feared his reaction, though he told Duran Duran biographer Steve Malins, "I would never get aggressive in a situation like that. There were things that had to be sorted out in a professional manner, so that's what I did." Cucurrullo remained on good terms with Rhodes, however, and in 2013 they released an album containing material from their Duran Duran side project, TV Mania.

In 2022, Cuccurullo was inducted into the Rock and Roll Hall of Fame as a member of Duran Duran alongside Rhodes, Le Bon, and the three Taylors. He played guitar on two of the songs on the band's 2023 album Danse Macabre: the title track and a cover of 1993's "Love Voodoo".

== Foray into adult entertainment ==
In December 2000, Cuccurillo appeared in "G Magazine," a Brazilian gay men's magazine that featured heterosexual models. On the magazine cover, he is nude but partially covered by an electric guitar, while he is fully nude in a pictorial within the magazine. In July 2001, soon after leaving Duran Duran, he relaunched his personal fan website. He subsequently introduced and sold the "Rock Rod," a sex toy modeled on his own anatomy.

== TV Mania ==
Beginning in the early 1990s, Cuccurullo collaborated with Duran Duran bandmate Nick Rhodes, calling themselves TV Mania, and began writing an experimental rock opera trilogy called Bored with Prozac and the Internet? (initially unreleased save for a few songs on Cuccurullo's website and in the movie Trollywood). Rhodes and Cuccurullo wrote and recorded a song called "Tomorrow Never Dies" with vocalist Tessa Niles for the James Bond film Tomorrow Never Dies. The song wasn't chosen, so Duran Duran re-recorded it for the Pop Trash album with new lyrics under the title "Last Day on Earth". In December 1996, Rhodes and Cuccurullo wrote and produced two songs for a never-completed Blondie project ("Pop Trash Movie" and "Studio 54"); the re-recording of the former gave the Pop Trash album its name.

The Duran Duran albums Medazzaland and Pop Trash were made up of reworked TV Mania songs, with Rhodes writing all lyrics to the songs on Pop Trash except for "Someone Else Not Me".

The full, 11-track album Bored with Prozac and the Internet? was given an official release on March 11, 2013.

== Solo and collaborative work ==
During breaks in Duran Duran's 1989–1990 tour schedule, Cuccurullo worked with Tetsuya Komuro, Shenkar and Patrick O'Hearn.

In 1994, the preparations for a solo show near his hometown led to a burst of creativity; he recorded and mixed the Thanks 2 Frank album in less than ten days, with bassists Pino Palladino and Nick Beggs and ex-Zappa drummer Vinnie Colaiuta. The album was released on Imago Records in 1996.

In 1997 Cuccurullo completed Machine Language, an ambient instrumental guitar album, also released on Imago. He followed up with a live album, Roadrage in 1998 (on Bandai Records). The Blue (recorded with Shenkar in 1992) was self-released in 2000. Another ambient album, Trance Formed, was released on One Way Records in 2003.

In 2005, Cuccurullo and Terry Bozzio collaborated on a CD titled Playing in Tongues, which was released in Europe on Edel Records and in the US on Zappa Records in 2009.

Cuccurullo also completed a concept album titled N'Liten Up, recorded at the Village studios in West Los Angeles by Kent Huffnagle and produced by Simone Sello.

== Missing Persons redux ==
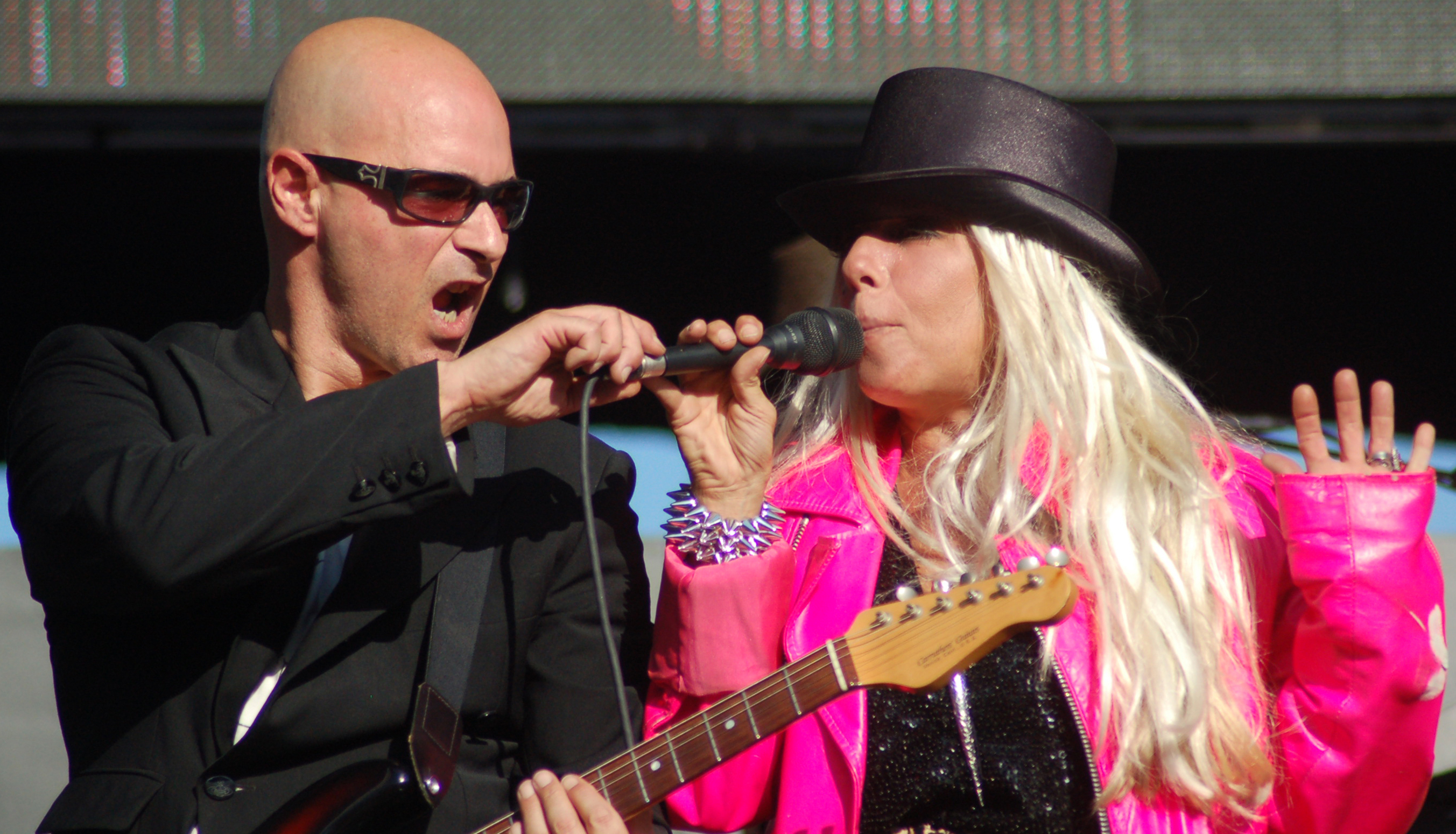
Cuccurullo with Dale Bozzio of the reformed Missing Persons in 2009

Spring Session M was released on CD in 1995, followed by Rhyme and Reason and Color in Your Life in 2000. Each of the three studio CDs were newly augmented by six rare B-sides or live tracks. Classic Remasters is a compilation of remastered tracks and dance mixes issued by Capitol Records with no band involvement.

Beginning in 1997, Cuccurullo began work on his "Missing Persons Archival Trilogy" project. The first CD to be released was Late Nights Early Days in 1998, a live concert recorded in 1981 with the added 1980 studio track "Action/Reaction". This was followed up by a compilation of modern remixes of classic MP tracks, Missing Persons Remixed Hits (1999) which included the TV Mania remix of "Destination Unknown". In 2002 Lost Tracks was released, a collection of extremely rare Missing Persons live tracks from five different eras of the band.

Meanwhile, in late 2000, Cuccurullo and Dale Bozzio again began discussing a Missing Persons reunion to feature original members Warren, Dale Bozzio and Terry Bozzio, with new keyboardist Ron Poster (of Dale Bozzio's band) and bassist Wes Wehmiller (formerly in Cuccurullo's solo band and Duran Duran's tour bassist from 1997 to 2001). The short-lived, official reunion consisted of promotional activities and three live performances in July 2001.

Late 2002/early 2003 resulted in "Missing Persons featuring Dale Bozzio and Warren Cuccurullo". Filling in were keyboardist Ron Poster, bassist Wes Wehmiller and drummer Joe Travers (formerly in Cuccurullo's solo band and Duran Duran's tour drummer from 1999 to 2001). This version of Missing Persons was featured on Access Hollywood (performing "Destination Unknown") and did three live performances in February 2003. Following this, Dale Bozzio returned to touring as Missing Persons with hired musicians. In 2011 Cuccurullo rejoined Bozzio as part of another short-lived Missing Persons reunion tour.

== Restaurant projects ==
In mid-2002, Cuccurullo purchased an Italian restaurant called Via Veneto in Santa Monica, California. He also funded the opening of a restaurant called Hidden and Vietnamese cuisine restaurants with Michael "Bao" Huynh.

== Return to music ==
Re-focusing on his music, Cuccurullo started a new collaborative project with composer Eric Alexandrakis, drummer Steve Ferrone, and producer Anthony J. Resta. Explaining the purpose of that project in a Modern Drummer news release Alexandrakis said, "The four of us decided to create a scoring collective to pursue scoring projects in TV themes, film, and advertising…"

Cuccurullo released the debut album from his collaborative effort with vocalist Neil Carlill, Chicanery, on May 11, 2010. Recorded a few years earlier, the album, also titled Chicanery, was released on CD and digital media through dPulse Recordings. Musicians who joined Cuccurullo and Carlill for selected sessions on the Chicanery album included among others, Terry Bozzio, Joe Travers, sarangi virtuoso Ustad Sultan Khan, and producer Simone Sello.

Also in 2010, Cuccurullo formed a local free jazz group called Theoretical 5 in Mar Vista, Los Angeles with Frank Zappa alumni Arthur Barrow (bass) and Tommy Mars (keyboards, vocals), and also Larry Klimas (saxophone), and Andy Kravitz (drums, percussion).

== Discography ==
=== With Frank Zappa ===
- Baby Snakes
- Joe's Garage Acts I, II, and III
- Shut Up 'n Play Yer Guitar
- Tinsel Town Rebellion
- Any Way the Wind Blows
- You Can't Do That on Stage Anymore Volume 1
- You Can't Do That on Stage Anymore Volume 4
- You Can't Do That on Stage Anymore Volume 6
- Guitar
- You Can't Do That on Stage Anymore Sampler
- Strictly Commercial
- Frank Zappa: A Memorial Tribute
- Have I Offended Someone? (Catholic Girls)
- Son of Cheep Thrills (Love of My Life)

=== With Missing Persons ===
- Missing Persons EP (1980, 1982)
- Spring Session M (1982, 1995)
- Rhyme & Reason (1984, 2000)
- Color in Your Life (1986, 2000)
- Best of Missing Persons (1987)
- Walking in L.A. (1988)
- Late Nights Early Days (1998)
- Missing Persons Remixed Hits (1999)
- Classic Remasters (2002)
- Lost Tracks (2002)

=== With Duran Duran ===
- Notorious (1986)
- Big Thing (1988)
- Liberty (1990)
- Duran Duran (The Wedding Album) (1993)
- Thank You (1995)
- Medazzaland (1997)
- Pop Trash (2000)
- Danse Macabre (2023)

=== Solo releases ===
- Thanks to Frank (1995)
- Machine Language (1997)
- Roadrage (1998)
- The Blue (2000)
- Trance Formed (2003)
- Playing in Tongues (March 2009 Edel Records – Europe, June 2009 Zappa Records – USA)
- n'liten up (2015 – Self-released via Bandcamp)
- Missing Person (2019)

=== Chicanery ===
- Chicanery (May 2010 dPulse Recordings)

=== Collaborations ===
- Frank Zappa
- Tetsuya Komuro/TM Network
- The Epidemics
- Dweezil Zappa
- Ellis, Beggs & Howard
- Blondie
- Patrick O'Hearn
- Terry Bozzio
- Ustad Sultan Khan
