= Hollywood Lie (album) =

Studio album by Missing Persons
- Released: November 10, 2023
- Genre: Rock
- Length: 37:21
- Label: Cleopatra
- Producer: Adam Hamilton

Missing Persons chronology
Dreaming (2020)	Hollywood Lie (2023)

Singles from Hollywood Lie
- 1. "Ice Blue Eyes" Released: October 10, 2023; 2. "Because of You I'm Crying" Released: October 26, 2023

Hollywood Lie is the seventh studio album by American rock band Missing Persons, and seventh release overall. The album was released November 10, 2023, on Cleopatra Records.

The single, "Ice Blue Eyes", preceded the release of the album.

== Track listing ==
All songs written by Dale Bozzio and Adam Hamilton, except where noted.

1. "Hollywood Lie" (Dale Bozzio, Karl D'Amico) – 3:23
2. "King 4 A Day" (Dale Bozzio, Troy Sebastian McKenzie) – 3:31
3. "Movie Star" – 2:49
4. "Castles In The Sand" – 3:21
5. "Lucky" – 3:21
6. "Because of You I'm Crying" (featuring Steve Stevens) – 3:10
7. "Fading Away" – 3:16
8. "Circles" – 3:00
9. "Ice Blue Eyes" – 3:55
10. "I Can't Take It Anymore" – 3:48
11. "Gatsby" – 3:44

== Personnel ==
- Prescott Niles – bass
- Adam Hamilton – drums, guitar, keyboards, producer, mixing
- Karl D'Amico – guitar
- Steve Stevens – guitar (6)
- Fred Bensi – keyboards
- Derick Hughes – mastering
- Paul Bostrand – piano
- Dale Bozzio – vocals
