= Tomboy and the Champ =

1961 film by Francis D. Lyon

- Directed by: Francis D. Lyon
- Screenplay by: Virginia M. Cooke; William Lightfoot
- Starring: Candy Moore; Ben Johnson; Jesse White
- Distributed by: Universal Pictures
- Release date: April 1, 1961
- Running time: 82 minutes
- Country: United States
- Language: English

Tomboy and the Champ is a 1961 American Western film directed by Francis D. Lyon and starring Candy Moore, Ben Johnson, and Jesse White.

== Plot ==
A young girl in Texas is stricken with polio, and caring for her pet calf keeps her strong. She enters the calf in the Chicago International Exposition. The calf wins but the girl discovers her cow will be auctioned off for a slaughterhouse. A good-natured meat packer intervenes, and girl and calf are reunited.

== Cast ==
- Candy Moore as Tommie Jo Layne
- Ben Johnson as Jim Wilkins
- Jesse White as Windy Skiles
- Jess Kirkpatrick as Parson Dan Webster
- Paul Bernath as Jasper Stockton
- Christine Smith as Sarah Wilkins
- Norman Sherry as Fowler Stockton
- John Carpenter as Fred Anderson
- Larry Hickie as Curly Cone
- Wally Phillips as Hi-Fi Club Announcer
- Ralph Fisher as 4-H Club President
- Rex Allen as Himself
- Casey Tibbs as Himself
- Jerry Naill as Himself
