= Candy Moore =

American child actress (born 1947)

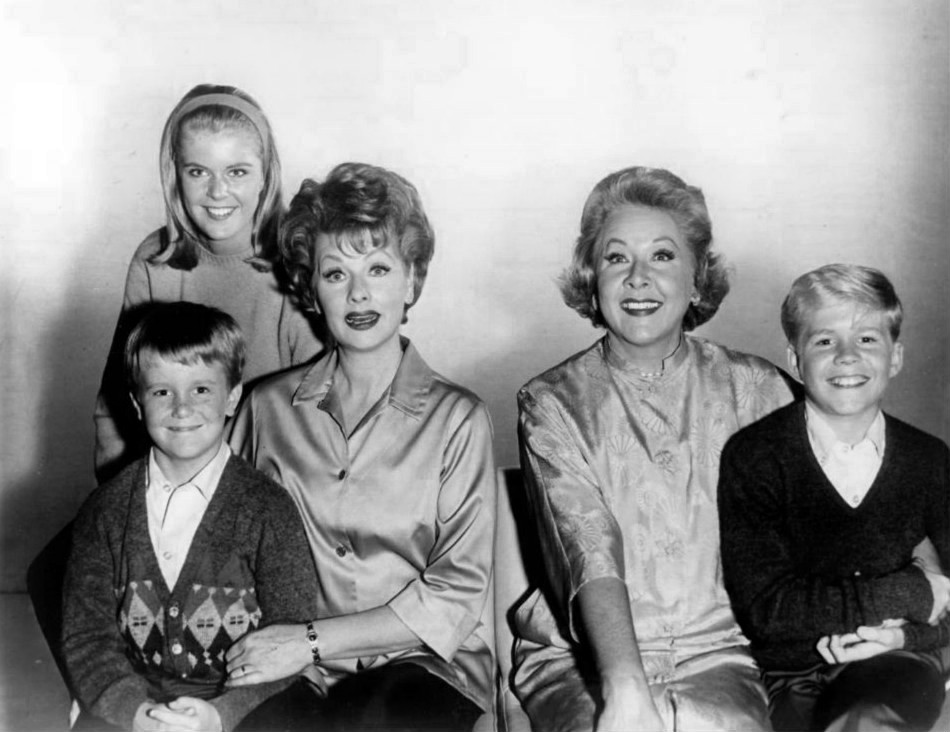
- Cast of The Lucy Show during its first three seasons: Candy Moore (in back); front, L-R: Jimmy Garrett, Lucille Ball, Vivian Vance, and Ralph Hart (1962)
- Born: Candace Lee Klaasen; August 26, 1947 (age 78); Maplewood, New Jersey, U.S.
- Education: UCLA
- Occupation: Actress
- Years active: 1959–1967, 1980–81
- Spouse: Paul Gleason (m. 1971; div. 1978)
- Children: 1

Candace Lee Klaasen (born August 26, 1947), better known as Candy Moore, is an American actress from Maplewood, New Jersey. Moore attended UCLA School of Theatre Arts. Moore began her career appearing on television series such as Leave It to Beaver and Letter to Loretta. In 1962, she was cast as Lucille Ball's daughter Chris Carmichael on The Lucy Show. Moore remained a regular on The Lucy Show through the end of the 1964–1965 season after which the premise of the show was retooled and most of the supporting cast was written out. Moore also appeared nine times on The Donna Reed Show, five as Angie Quinn, the girlfriend of series character Jeff Stone (Paul Petersen).

== Career ==
In 1959–1960, she appeared in two episodes of the second season of One Step Beyond, as Carolyn Peters in "Forked Lightning" (ep. 9), and as Callie Wylie in "Goodbye Grandpa" (ep. 38).

In 1961, she played Margie Manners, the kitchen seductress of Wally Cleaver, in the Leave It To Beaver episode "Mother's Helper" (S4:E23). That same year she also acted in one episode each of The Loretta Young Show and Wagon Train.

In 1961–1962, she portrayed Gillian Favor in two episodes of Rawhide. She also appeared in the first season of My Three Sons as a hiker in the 1961 episode "Fire Watch" (ep. 36).

Moore also starred in a television pilot titled Time Out for Ginger, which aired on CBS on September 18, 1962. However, it didn't sell.

Moore has also appeared in films such as Raging Bull, The Night of the Grizzly, Tomboy and the Champ, and Lunch Wagon.

== Filmography ==
=== Film ===
Year	Title	Role	Notes	Ref(s)
1961	Tomboy and the Champ	Tommy Jo		
1965	In Harm's Way	Girl at Blue Lagoon Bar		
1966	The Night of the Grizzly	Meg		
1980	Raging Bull	Linda		
1981	Lunch Wagon	Diedre		

=== Television ===
Year	Title	Role	Notes	Ref(s)
1959–60	Alcoa Presents: One Step Beyond	Callie Wylie / Carolyn Peters	2 Episodes, including: 'Forked Lightening ', (Nov. 17, '59).	
1961	Leave It to Beaver	Margie Manners	Episode: "Mother's Helper"	
1961	The Loretta Young Show	Love	Episode: "The Forbidden Guests"	
1961	Wagon Train	Sue Ellison	Episode: "Wagon to Fort Anderson	
1961	My Three Sons	Shirley	Episode: "Fire Watch"	
1961	Shannon	Donna Humphrey	Episode: "The Embezzler's Daughter"	
1961–62	Rawhide	Gillian Favor	2 episodes	
1961–66	The Donna Reed Show	Angie / Bernice / Bebe / Bebe Barnes	10 episodes	
1962	Bachelor Father	Phyllis Hartzell	Episode: "Bentley Goes to Bat"	
1962	The Comedy Spot	Ginger Carol	Episode: "Time Out for Ginger"	
1962–65	The Lucy Show	Chris Carmichael	39 episodes	
1967	Dream Girl of '67	Herself	Fashion hostess; 5 episodes	
