= Rhyme & Reason (Missing Persons album) =

Studio album by Missing Persons
- Released: February 21, 1984
- Genres: New wave; rock
- Length: 40:16
- Label: Capitol
- Producers: Terry Bozzio; Bruce Swedien; Missing Persons

Missing Persons chronology
Spring Session M (1982)	Rhyme & Reason (1984)	Color in Your Life (1986)

Singles from Rhyme & Reason
- 1. "Give" Released: March 1984 (US); 2. "Right Now" Released: May 1984 (US); 3. "Surrender Your Heart" Released: August 1984 (US)

Rhyme & Reason is the second studio album by American band Missing Persons, released in 1984. It was a commercial disappointment. A video was created for "Surrender Your Heart" featuring animations from Peter Max. "Give" and "Right Now" were also released as singles, and videos made for both received airplay on MTV. Missing Persons embarked on a successful tour, but the album quickly fell off the sales charts.

== Critical reception ==
Professional ratings
Review scores
Source	Rating
AllMusic	3/5 stars

The Christian Science Monitor wrote that "the most accurate description of the album's tone is that it's consistently bland... The pace, beat, and modulation of the music sounds the same; the only change is in the lyrics." The Omaha World-Herald concluded that "Missing Persons continues to show why it is one of the worst of the trendy Los Angeles new wave bands."

== Track listing ==
1. "The Closer That You Get" (Dale Bozzio, Terry Bozzio, Warren Cuccurullo) – 4:54
2. "Give" (D. Bozzio, T. Bozzio, Cuccurullo, Patrick O'Hearn) – 4:54
3. "Now Is the Time (For Love)" (T. Bozzio) – 3:40
4. "Surrender Your Heart" (D. Bozzio, T. Bozzio, Cuccurullo, O'Hearn) – 4:22
5. "Clandestine People" (T. Bozzio, Cuccurullo) – 3:00
6. "Right Now" (D. Bozzio, T. Bozzio) – 3:29
7. "All Fall Down" (D. Bozzio, T. Bozzio) – 3:23
8. "Racing Against Time" (T. Bozzio, Cuccurullo) – 3:24
9. "Waiting for a Million Years" (D. Bozzio, T. Bozzio, Cuccurullo) – 5:23
10. "If Only for the Moment" (D. Bozzio, O'Hearn) – 3:47

CD bonus tracks

11. "Fight for Life" [Instrumental/*] (D. Bozzio, T. Bozzio, Cuccurullo) – 5:21
12. "Action Reaction" [*] (D. Bozzio, T. Bozzio, Cuccurullo) – 2:53
13. "Windows" [Live 1981] (D. Bozzio, T. Bozzio) – 4:59
14. "I Like Boys" [Live 1981] (D. Bozzio, T. Bozzio, Cuccurullo) – 2:53
15. "Here and Now" [Live 1981] (D. Bozzio, T. Bozzio, Cuccurullo) – 3:14
16. "Walking in L.A." [Live 1981] (T. Bozzio) – 4:05

* previously unreleased

CD bonus tracks (2021 Rubellan Remasters edition)

11. "Fight for Life" [Instrumental] (D. Bozzio, T. Bozzio, Cuccurullo)
12. "Give (Dance Mix)" [*] (D. Bozzio, T. Bozzio, Cuccurullo, Patrick O'Hearn)
13. "If Only for the Moment (Full Version) (D. Bozzio, O'Hearn)

== Personnel ==
- Dale Bozzio – vocals
- Terry Bozzio – synthesizer, percussion, drums, vocals
- Warren Cuccurullo – guitar, electric guitar, vocals
- Patrick O'Hearn – synthesizer, bass, electric bass
- Chuck Wild – synthesizer, keyboard

Production

- Producers: Terry Bozzio, Bruce Swedien
- Mastering: Kit Watkins
- Art direction: Larry Vigon
- Design: Larry Vigon
- Photography: Bob Leafe, Helmut Newton
- Liner notes: Ken Sharp

== Charts ==
Chart (1984)	Peak position
US Billboard 200	43
