= Spring Session M =

Studio album by Missing Persons
- Released: October 8, 1982
- Recorded: 1980–1982
- Studio: Chateau Recorders (Los Angeles)
- Genre: New wave; rock
- Length: 42:38
- Label: Capitol
- Producer: Ken Scott

Missing Persons chronology
Spring Session M (1982)	Rhyme & Reason (1984)

Singles from Spring Session M
- 1. "Words" Released: May 1982; 2. "Destination Unknown" Released: September 1982; 3. "Windows" Released: January 1983; 4. "Walking in L.A." Released: February 1983

Professional ratings
Review scores
Source	Rating
AllMusic	4.5/5 stars
Christgau's Record Guide	C+

Spring Session M is the debut studio album by American rock band Missing Persons. It was released on October 8, 1982, by Capitol Records. The title of the album is an anagram of the band's name. Produced by Ken Scott with the songs written by Terry Bozzio, Dale Bozzio, and Warren Cuccurullo, Spring Session M is a new wave rock album with elements of synth-pop.

Upon its release, the album received generally positive reviews from music critics and also noted commercial success, peaking at #17 on the Billboard 200. Spring Session M was certified gold by the Recording Industry Association of America (RIAA).

Four singles were released from the album: "Words", "Windows", "Destination Unknown", and "Walking in L.A." All singles charted on the Billboard Hot 100, with "Words" and "Destination Unknown" both reaching #42, and the music videos also received regular airplay on MTV.

== Track listing ==
Original release
No.	Title	Writer(s)	Length
1.	"Noticeable One"	Dale Bozzio; Terry Bozzio; Warren Cuccurullo	3:22
2.	"Windows"	D. Bozzio; T. Bozzio	4:59
3.	"It Ain't None of Your Business"	T. Bozzio; Cuccurullo	2:55
4.	"Destination Unknown"	D. Bozzio; T. Bozzio; Cuccurullo	3:34
5.	"Walking in L.A."	T. Bozzio	3:59
6.	"U.S. Drag"	T. Bozzio; Cuccurullo	3:36
7.	"Tears"	D. Bozzio; T. Bozzio	4:22
8.	"Here and Now"	D. Bozzio; T. Bozzio; Cuccurullo	3:26
9.	"Words"	T. Bozzio; Cuccurullo	4:25
10.	"Bad Streets"	T. Bozzio	3:41
11.	"Rock and Roll Suspension"	D. Bozzio; T. Bozzio; Cuccurullo	2:34
12.	"No Way Out"	T. Bozzio; Cuccurullo	2:45
Total length:			42:38

1995 reissue bonus tracks
No.	Title	Writer(s)	Length
13.	"Hello, I Love You"	Jim Morrison; Ray Manzarek; Robbie Krieger; John Densmore	2:18
14.	"Mental Hopscotch"	T. Bozzio; Cuccurullo	3:14

CD bonus tracks (2021 Rubellan Remasters edition)

13. "I Like Boys" (D. Bozzio, T. Bozzio, W. Cuccurullo)
14. "Mental Hopscotch" (T. Bozzio, Cuccurullo)
15. "Hello, I Love You" [Jim Morrison, Ray Manzarek, Robbie Krieger, John Densmore]
16. "Action Reaction" (D. Bozzio, T. Bozzio, W. Cuccurullo)

== Personnel ==
Missing Persons

- Dale Bozzio – vocals
- Terry Bozzio – vocals, keyboards, synthesizers, drums, percussion
- Warren Cuccurullo – guitar, vocals
- Patrick O'Hearn – electric and synthesized bass; keyboards, synthesizers
- Chuck Wild – synthesizer, keyboard

Production

- Ken Scott – producer, engineer
- Brian Leshon, Phil Jost, Ralph Sutton – assistant engineers
- Bernie Grundman – mastering
- Glen Wexler – photography, art direction, design
- Kurt Triffet – artwork and design

== Charts ==
=== Weekly charts ===
Chart (1982–1983)	Peak position
Australia (Kent Music Report)	73
US Billboard 200	17

=== Year-end charts ===
Chart (1983)	Position
US Billboard 200	23

== Certifications and sales ==
Region	Certification	Certified units/sales
United States (RIAA)	Gold	500,000^{^}
^{^} Shipments figures based on certification alone.
