= Chuck Wild =

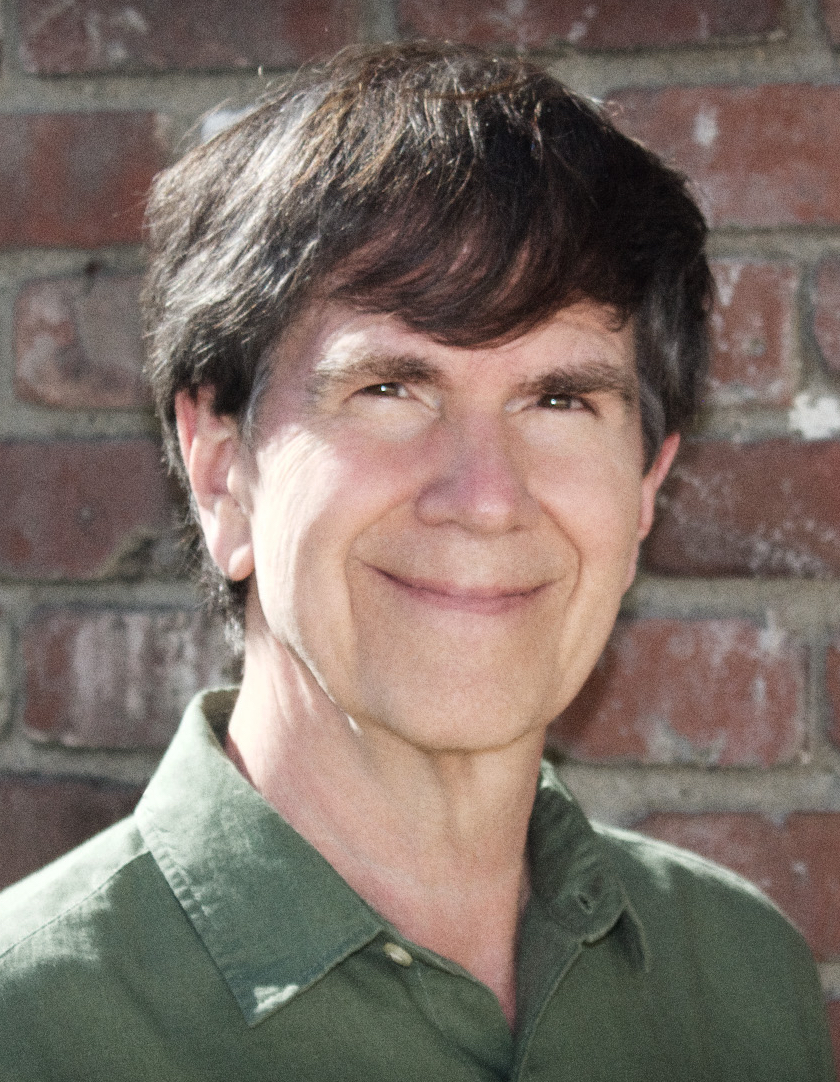

Background information
- Also known as: Liquid Mind
- Born: September 22, 1946 (age 79); Kansas City, Missouri, United States
- Genres: Electronic music; Ambient; new-age
- Occupations: Musician, composer, producer, songwriter
- Years active: 1972–present
- Labels: Chuck Wild Records, Real Music
- Formerly of: Missing Persons
- Website: www.liquidmindmusic.com

Chuck Wild (born September 22, 1946, in Kansas City) is a keyboardist, composer, producer, recording artist and Emmy Award-nominated songwriter best known for his series of relaxation music albums using the artist name and imprint Liquid Mind. As of February 2025, there are 19 albums in the Liquid Mind catalog.

== Early work ==
Wild's career spans 50 years from 1972 to the present, including writing 125 songs and compositions used in TV, films, and music albums. He was signed to Warner/Chappell Music and Lorimar-Telepictures as a staff songwriter in 1987 and co-wrote "You're My One And Only" with songwriter Marti Sharron, a #1 hit in Germany for Jennifer Rush on Passion.

His catalog includes studio work and concert performances as keyboardist with the 1980s Capitol Records band Missing Persons on the Spring Session M (1982) and Rhyme & Reason (1984) albums, during which time he worked with vocalist Dale Bozzio, drummer Terry Bozzio, guitarist Warren Cuccurullo, and bassist Patrick O'Hearn.

Studio work with Michael Jackson from 1994 to 1998 includes drums, keyboards, percussion, programming, sound design, sound effects, soundscapes, synthesizer and synthesizer programming on the HIStory: Past, Present and Future, Book I album. Wild was mentored by the late five-time Grammy Award-winning engineer/producer Bruce Swedien from 1984 to 2021.

Notable projects with other recording artists include studio work with Frank Zappa, Paula Abdul, and songwriting/studio recording for Philip Bailey, The Pointer Sisters and Tommy Page among many others.

He composed and recorded original music for The Panama Deception, a documentary film about the 1989 invasion of Panama by the United States and corporate media complicity. The film won an Academy Award for Best Documentary Feature in 1992.

Wild co-wrote the song "Starr X'd Lovers" with Michèle Vice-Maslin and Dorian Cheah for the ABC TV series One Life to Live, which was nominated for Outstanding Original Song For A Drama Series at the 2011 Daytime Emmy Awards.

Wild was signed to the Real Music record label from 2004 to 2014

He received a Special President's Award from Barbara Wheeler, president of the American Music Therapy Association, on November 12, 2009, in San Diego California at their 2009 Annual Conference, "In recognition for outstanding advocacy, generosity and support of the Music Therapy profession."

== Liquid Mind ==
Wild is best known for his series of Liquid Mind albums; Liquid Mind is classified by music critics and listeners as therapeutic music, sedative music, ambient music, or new-age music. For example, Liquid Mind XI: Deep Sleep charted at #1 on the iTunes USA Top 100 New Age album charts after its release on February 5, 2016. Relax: A Liquid Mind Experience charted at #10 on the New Age Billboard charts on March 22, 2008.

=== Inception ===
Wild discusses the inception and process of creating the Liquid Mind series in many published interviews:

The Liquid Mind series was born from my struggle with panic attacks and anxiety while co-scoring the Emmy Award-winning American Broadcasting Company television series Max Headroom with composer Michael Hoenig. During the same period more than 60 of my friends, associates and family members died of HIV and cancer. To help heal from the panic, a counselor suggested that I write music representing the way I wanted to feel. This resulted in the first Liquid Mind album, Ambience Minimus, completed in 1988.

When I discovered this music was effective in healing my own anxiety and panic attacks, and with the encouragement of fellow artist Suzanne Doucet, I decided to release it through major distribution. The ultimate compliment to me is that people fall asleep to my music. Liquid Mind is functional music, assisting us to be tranquil at those times when that may not be easy.

== Discography ==
=== Liquid Mind albums ===
- Ambience Minimus (1994)
- Slow World (1996)
- Liquid Mind III: Balance (1999)
- Liquid Mind IV: Unity (2000)
- Liquid Mind V: Serenity (2001)
- Liquid Mind VI: Spirit (2003)
- Liquid Mind VII: Reflection (2004)
- Liquid Mind VIII: Sleep (2006)
- Relax: A Liquid Mind Experience (2007)
- Liquid Mind IX: Lullaby (2009)
- Dream: A Liquid Mind Experience (2011)
- Liquid Mind X: Meditation (2012)
- Liquid Mind: Relaxing Rain & Ocean Mixes (2014)
- Liquid Mind XI: Deep Sleep (2016)
- Liquid Mind XII: Peace (2018)
- Liquid Mind XIII: Mindfulness (2020)
- Liquid Mind: Musical Healthcare (2021)
- Liquid Mind XIV: Simplicity (2022)
- Liquid Mind XV: In The Love (2025)

=== Liquid Mind and Bryan Baker ===
- The Wisdom of Kindness Flute Remix (2023)

Renowned photographer and graphic designer Glen Wexler designed the album covers and packaging for eleven Liquid Mind albums.

=== Selected work with other recording artists ===
- Missing Persons (band), Spring Session M (1982 album) - Certified gold by the Recording Industry Association of America (RIAA)
- Missing Persons (band), Rhyme & Reason (1984 album)
- Paula Abdul, drums and programming on the song State Of Attraction from the Forever Your Girl album (1988)
- The Pointer Sisters, drum machine, programming and synthesizer on the song Say The Word from the Hot Together album, co-written with Glen Ballard and Marti Sharron. (1986)
- Philip Bailey (album) of Earth, Wind & Fire, co-writer with Roxanne Seeman of the song Yours on Bailey's solo album (1994)
- Michael Jackson, HIStory: Past, Present and Future, Book I, drums, keyboards, percussion, programming, sound design, sound effects, soundscapes, synthesizer and synthesizer programming (1995)
- Beautiful Music Machine, songwriting, programming, keyboards and arranging on the Soundtrack of the Inner World album with Seven Whitfield (2016)

=== Selected music for film ===
In addition to credits listed above, Chuck Wild has contributed music to many films in major distribution.

- The Karate Kid Part III, Columbia Pictures (1989)

High Wire (song)

Written by Jeff Silbar and Chuck Wild
Performed by Glenn Medeiros

- Breaking the Rules (film), Miramax Films, starring Jason Bateman (1992)

Co-writer on four songs composed for the film:

Gravity

Music and Lyrics by Frank Fitzpatrick, Chuck Wild and Sue Sheridan
Performed by Hidden Faces
Produced by Frank Fitzpatrick and David Kitay

I Can't Get You Out Of My Mind

Music and Lyrics by Frank Fitzpatrick and Chuck Wild
Performed by Hidden Faces
Produced by Frank Fitzpatrick and David Kitay

Can't Stop Thinking Of You

Music and Lyrics by Frank Fitzpatrick, Chuck Wild and Sue Sheridan
Performed by Hidden Faces
Produced by Frank Fitzpatrick and David Kitay

Hurt So Bad (To Love)

Music and Lyrics by Frank Fitzpatrick and Chuck Wild
Performed by Hidden Faces
Produced by Frank Fitzpatrick

- Away We Go, Focus Features (2009)

Teach Me To Whisper from Liquid Mind VI: Spirit

Written by Chuck Wild
Performed by Liquid Mind

=== Conflict resolution album ===
Liquid Mind XII: Peace

Studio album by Chuck Wild
- Released: January 19, 2018
- Genre: Electronic music; Ambient music; New-age music
- Length: 62:17
- Label: Chuck Wild Records
- Producer: Chuck Wild / Assoc. Producer Jonathan Marozik

Wild's twelfth Liquid Mind studio album, Liquid Mind XII: Peace, was released on January 19, 2018. It is unique to the series in that it is the only Liquid Mind album composed by Wild with a specific theme. Titles of the eight tracks on the album represent steps in the process of conflict resolution.

Extensive liner notes and a music video were made available on the album website, including the following commentary by Wild (track titles are italicized):

"No one is born hating another person; people can and do change every day. Peace between differing ideologies and cultures, though not impossible to achieve, may be challenging to attain. However, peace on a person-to-person basis is possible between any two willing individuals, regardless of their backgrounds.

Even the smallest step taken by one individual as a peacemaker can build a bridge of hope, encouragement and understanding which will grow in a harmonious way. The titles of the compositions on this album are steps we can each take towards conflict resolution:

We begin by acknowledging that At the Center Is Love. Where there is a capacity for love, which all humans share, there can be peace. The peace process begins with respectful Communication between two people, Person to Person, which leads to a discovery of their Shared Values. These shared values create a willingness to Surrender to Love, and we are able to move forward together as a measure of Trust develops. As trust grows, we become aware of our Oneness, and the Spirit of Peace prevails. It is the process of engendering peace to which this album is dedicated."
