= Lunch Wagon =

1981 film by Ernest Pintoff

- Directed by: Ernest Pintoff
- Written by: Marshall Harvey; Leon Phillips/Terrie Frankel
- Produced by: Mark Borde
- Starring: Pamela Jean Bryant; Rosanne Katon; Candy Moore; Rick Podell; James Van Patten; Chuck McCann; Rose Marie; Michael Tucci; Louisa Moritz
- Cinematography: Fred Lemler
- Edited by: M. Edward Salier
- Distributed by: Seymour Borde & Associates (United States and Canada); Manson International (International)
- Release date: September 1981
- Running time: 88 minutes
- Country: United States
- Language: English
- Box office: $1,170,000

Lunch Wagon (also known as Lunch Wagon Girls) is a 1981 sex comedy film starring Pamela Jean Bryant, Rosanne Katon, and Candy Moore.

The film was directed by Ernest Pintoff and written by Marshall Harvey and Terrie Frankel and Leon Phillips. Mayor Bradley declared "Lunch Wagon Day" for the opening, and there was a parade of over 80 Lunch Wagons down Hollywood Boulevard. The film was very popular with teens and was the largest grossing independent movie of 1981.

== Synopsis ==
Three women start a lunch wagon business, but run into resistance from their competitor Mr. Schmeckler (Rick Podell) when their business starts interfering with illegal activity that Schmeckler is involved in. While Schmeckler busies himself trying to sabotage their wagon, the women are busy falling in love with construction workers and rock stars. Meanwhile, two bumbling diamond thieves create complications for both sides. The film was the first major exposure for the band Missing Persons, credited here as "U.S. Drag", with their songs "Mental Hopscotch" and "I Like Boys" featuring prominently on the soundtrack.
