= Walking in L.A. =

1983 single by Missing Persons

Single by Missing Persons

from the album Spring Session M
- Released: February 1983
- Recorded: 1982
- Studio: Chateau Recorders (Los Angeles)
- Genre: New wave
- Length: 3:59
- Label: Capitol
- Songwriter: Terry Bozzio
- Producer: Ken Scott

Missing Persons singles chronology
"Windows" (1983)	"Walking in L.A." (1983)	"Give" (1984)

"Walking in L.A." is a song by American new wave band Missing Persons. It was written by Terry Bozzio, with production by Ken Scott at Chateau Recorders, in Los Angeles, California. The song appeared on their debut studio album Spring Session M in 1982 and has been described as the pivotal song on the album. It was released as a single in February 1983. A live version of the song (recorded in 1981) was released as a CD bonus track on Missing Persons' 1984 album, Rhyme & Reason.

The song peaked at number 70 on the US Billboard Hot 100 in March 1983, spending six weeks on the chart. It peaked at number 12 on the Billboard Top (Rock) Tracks chart in February of that year. It is still recalled occasionally today for its comical portrayal of Hollywood culture and its wry observations on getting around in Los Angeles (“Nobody walks in L.A.!”). Songwriter Terry Bozzio has said that he was inspired to write the song by comedians making jokes about driving everywhere in the city.

== Release history ==
Country	Date	Format	Label	Ref.
United States	February 1983	7"	Capitol	

== Charts ==
Chart performance for "Walking in L.A."
Chart (1983)	Peak; position
US Billboard Hot 100	70
US Cash Box Top 100	62
US Billboard Top Tracks	12

== Cover versions and media appearances ==
- American rock band Hagfish covered the song on the 1997 punk rock compilation album, Before You Were Punk.
- American actress and singer Traci Lords covered the song as a promotional single in 2003.
- The song is featured in the 2011 film Take Me Home Tonight.
- The song is played in Season 1, episode 4, of the MTV reality TV series, The Hills, titled "Lauren And Jason, Take Two" (2006).
- The song is played in the opening scene to Season 1 Episode 13 of the ABC series High Potential, which aired on February 11, 2025.
