= Patrick O'Hearn =

American multi-instrumentalist and composer (born 1954)

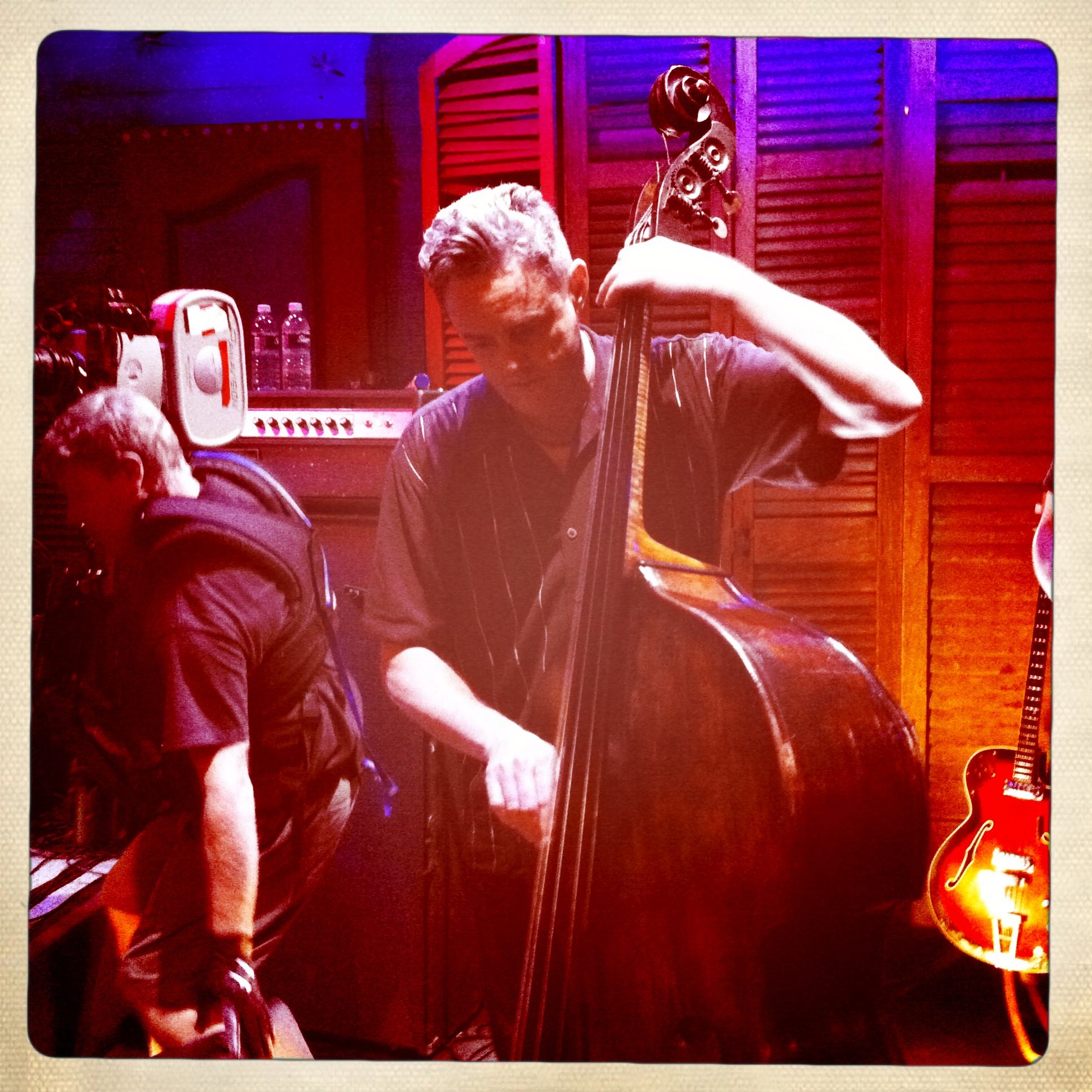
- O'Hearn performing in HBO series Treme, 2011

Background information
- Born: Patrick John O'Hearn; September 6, 1954 (age 72); Los Angeles, California, U.S.
- Genres: New age; jazz; rock; new wave
- Occupations: Musician; composer
- Years active: 1970–present
- Labels: Columbia; Capitol; Private Music; BMG; Deep Cave; Patrick O'Hearn Music
- Formerly of: Missing Persons
- Website: patrickohearn.com

Patrick John O'Hearn (born September 6, 1954) is an American multi-instrumentalist, composer, and recording artist.

Known primarily as a bass guitarist and keyboardist, O'Hearn came to prominence with Frank Zappa and co-founded the early 1980s new wave band Missing Persons with several other veterans from Zappa's bands. O'Hearn's musical repertoire spans a diverse range including new-age. In addition to solo albums, he has composed soundtracks for movies and television.

== Biography ==
=== Formative years ===
Born in Los Angeles, California and raised in the Pacific Northwest, O'Hearn began his professional music career at age 15 when he joined the Musicians Union and began playing night clubs in Portland, Oregon. Upon graduating from Sunset High School in 1972, he moved to Seattle, Washington. There, he briefly attended Cornish College of the Arts, and as well, studied privately with bassist Gary Peacock.

In 1973, he moved to San Francisco, California and soon became involved in the Bay Area jazz scene of that time, playing bass for established artists Charles Lloyd, Joe Henderson, Dexter Gordon, Joe Pass, Woody Shaw, Eddie Henderson, and Bobby Hutcherson. He also collaborated with musicians his own age, including Terry Bozzio, Mark Isham and Peter Maunu.

While on tour in Los Angeles in 1976, O'Hearn met musician Frank Zappa, who offered him a job as bass player in his band—a position he held for over two years. During this period, O’Hearn shifted from the acoustic bass to the electric bass guitar, and also became increasingly interested in electronic music. Zappa encouraged O’Hearn to explore his collection of synthesizers, and also introduced him to the technical aspects of music production, audio engineering, and home studio audio recording equipment.

In 1979, O'Hearn teamed with trumpet player Mark Isham and guitarist Peter Maunu to form Group 87. Group 87 only produced two LPs—Group 87 in 1980, and A Career in Dada Processing in 1984, but Patrick O'Hearn was a member of the band only on the first album, as he would soon thereafter join Missing Persons. Isham and Maunu would appear as collaborators on several of O'Hearn's later solo releases.

=== 1980s and solo career ===
In 1981, drummer and former Zappa bandmate Terry Bozzio invited O’Hearn to join his emerging new wave band, Missing Persons along with guitarist and fellow Zappa alumnus Warren Cuccurullo and Dale Bozzio, who had performed vocals in several Zappa productions and recently married Terry. O'Hearn shifted from electric bass to synthesizers. Missing Persons recorded three albums for Capitol Records: Spring Session M (1982), Rhyme & Reason (1984), and Color In Your Life (1986). The band dissolved in early 1986; subsequently, O'Hearn joined with former Duran Duran guitarist Andy Taylor and former Sex Pistols guitarist Steve Jones for one album, Thunder (1987), and a brief tour.

O'Hearn's solo career was spurred in large part by former Tangerine Dream member Peter Baumann, who had been conceiving of a new music label that would showcase progressive instrumental music—a niche earlier explored by Group 87. Baumann formed the Private Music label in late 1984, and produced O'Hearn's debut solo album, Ancient Dreams (1985).

O'Hearn followed Ancient Dreams with two more albums—Between Two Worlds (1987), which earned the artist his first Grammy nomination, and Rivers Gonna Rise (1988). O'Hearn began to receive greater airplay on jazz and new-age radio stations. O'Hearn also co-produced several tracks for guitarist Colin Chin's Intruding on a Silence, featuring Mark Isham on trumpet. O'Hearn released his fourth solo album Eldorado in 1989, which blended elements of World Music with warm keyboard textures.

=== 1990s ===
The next O'Hearn release was Indigo in 1991. Winding up their contract, Private Music assembled a compilation album in 1992 titled The Private Music of Patrick O'Hearn. This album included three previously unreleased tracks titled "Down Hill Racer", "Irene", and "Step".

In 1992, O'Hearn composed and performed the music score for White Sands, a crime thriller starring Willem Dafoe and Samuel L. Jackson. The film was directed by Roger Donaldson. Later that year he composed the score to Silent Tongue, written and directed by Sam Shepard and starring Alan Bates, Richard Harris, River Phoenix and Dermot Mulroney.

O'Hearn released Trust in 1995 under the newly formed Deep Cave record label. Featuring contributions from David Torn and former bandmates Terry Bozzio and Warren Cuccurullo, Trust earned O'Hearn his second Grammy nomination. Shortly after the release of his next album, Metaphor (1996), the Deep Cave record label folded. Also released in 1996 was the soundtrack to the film Crying Freeman.

There have been a few various artists albums that O'Hearn has contributed new material to. In 1998, his 12-minute composition "35th Parallel" appeared on the five-artist album The Ambient Expanse. In 2000, his version of a Johann Sebastian Bach piece called "Prelude from Cello Suite No. 1" appeared on the compilation A Different Prelude: A Contemporary Collection. In 2003 his version of the Joaquín Rodrigo composition "Adagio from Fantasy for a Gentleman" appeared on the compilation Adagio: A Windham Hill Collection. This last track can also be found on the various artists compilation Sundown: Windham Hill Piano Collection, released in 2006.

=== 2000s ===
O'Hearn's next solo project, So Flows the Current (2001), was recorded over a three-year period from 1997 to 2000.

In 2002, cinematographer David Fortney created a film of landscape images paired with O'Hearn music. The result was Timeless - A National Parks Odyssey which was released on DVD in 2002. This also includes a new version of the track "Beauty In Darkness," originally from O'Hearn's debut album.

Beautiful World was O'Hearn's next release in 2003, and it was voted the No. 1 album on the nationally syndicated radio program Echoes. This was followed by Slow Time in 2005. O'Hearn dedicated the track "Music For Three Vibraphones" in memory of his mentor Frank Zappa.

In 2006, O'Hearn released three recordings via iTunes online delivery only. The first two of these are the soundtrack EP to Sean Garland's short film The Wheelhouse, and the soundtrack album to the Sam Shepard stage play Simpatico (originally recorded in 1994). These were followed by The So Flows Sessions, which is a full-length album of previously unreleased material from the recording sessions in 1997–2000 that produced So Flows The Current.

The next year in 2007 O'Hearn released the CD Glaciation, inspired by images of Earth's Arctic regions. In the summer of 2007, O'Hearn was introduced to singer-songwriter John Hiatt and played bass on Hiatt's Same Old Man album. Hiatt subsequently asked him to join his band and tour in support of the album's 2008 release. O'Hearn continued to tour with Hiatt through 2010 and recorded on his following releases: The Open Road (2010), Dirty Jeans and Mudslide Hymns (2011), and Mystic Pinball (2012).

=== 2010s ===
O'Hearn's 13th album Transitions was released digitally on August 23, 2011, and on CD on October 4. It was voted No.1 album of 2011 on the Echoes Listener's Poll.

In December 2013, a various artists album titled Nashville Indie Spotlight was released, which includes a new track by Patrick O'Hearn and Peter Maunu called Out of Reach.

His daughter, Rachel, is an electronic musician, performing under the names Chromatiq and Black Sound Effects.

=== 2020s ===
In October 2020, Patrick O’Hearn released a new single online titled Rivulet, which also had a second version titled Rivulet (Tranquility Mix).

In August 2024, O'Hearn released an EP titled Quattro Amici, which is four tracks from his first album Ancient Dreams that have been reworked in varying degrees. Malevolent Landscape and Beauty in Darkness have new music added to the start and end of the song. At First Light and Ancient Dreams don’t have new music, but they’ve been remixed with some additional piano. The song titles on the EP have mostly been given ethnic derivatives of the original titles.

In January 2026, another track by Patrick O’Hearn & Peter Maunu was released as a single, titled Hellenistic Spa.

== Discography ==
=== Solo albums ===
| Released | Title | Label |
|---|---|---|
| Sep 24, 1985 | Ancient Dreams | Private Music |
| Apr 5, 1987 | Between Two Worlds | Private Music |
| Oct 25, 1988 | Rivers Gonna Rise | Private Music |
| Aug 4, 1989 | Eldorado | Private Music |
| Sep 24, 1991 | Indigo | Private Music |
| July 15, 1995 | Trust | Deep Cave |
| March 7, 1996 | Metaphor | Deep Cave |
| Feb 20, 2001 | So Flows the Current | Patrick O'Hearn |
| Nov 4, 2003 | Beautiful World | Patrick O'Hearn |
| Feb 28, 2005 | Slow Time | Patrick O'Hearn |
| July 7, 2006 | The So Flows Sessions | Patrick O'Hearn |
| Aug 22, 2007 | Glaciation | Patrick O'Hearn |
| Aug 23, 2011 | Transitions | Patrick O'Hearn |

=== Compilations ===
| Released | Title | Label |
|---|---|---|
| Sep 11, 1990 | Mix-Up (Remixes by other producers) | Private Music |
| Nov 10, 1992 | The Private Music of Patrick O'Hearn | Private Music |
| July 15, 1997 | A Windham Hill Retrospective | Windham Hill |
| May 2008 | Timeless - A National Parks Odyssey | Janson Media |

=== Soundtracks ===
| Released | Title | Label |
|---|---|---|
| April 24, 1992 | White Sands | Morgan Creek |
| April 29, 1996 | Crying Freeman | Ariola |
| June 15, 2006 | The Wheelhouse (short film) | Patrick O'Hearn |
| June 26, 2006 | Simpatico (stage play) | Patrick O'Hearn |

=== Additional music for film and television ===
Patrick O’Hearn did the soundtrack music for these, without releasing a soundtrack album.

| Released | Title | Medium |
|---|---|---|
| September 28, 1988 | Destroyer | Film |
| 1989–1990 | Falcon Crest, Season 9 | TV series |
| October 4, 1991 | Heaven Is a Playground | Film |
| January 28, 1993 | Silent Tongue | Film |
| August 27, 1993 | Father Hood | Film |
| May 10, 1995 | As Good As Dead | TV movie |
| January 28, 1999 | Alien Cargo | TV movie |
| July 12, 2001 | Border Patrol | TV movie |
