= Dale Bozzio =

American rock and pop vocalist

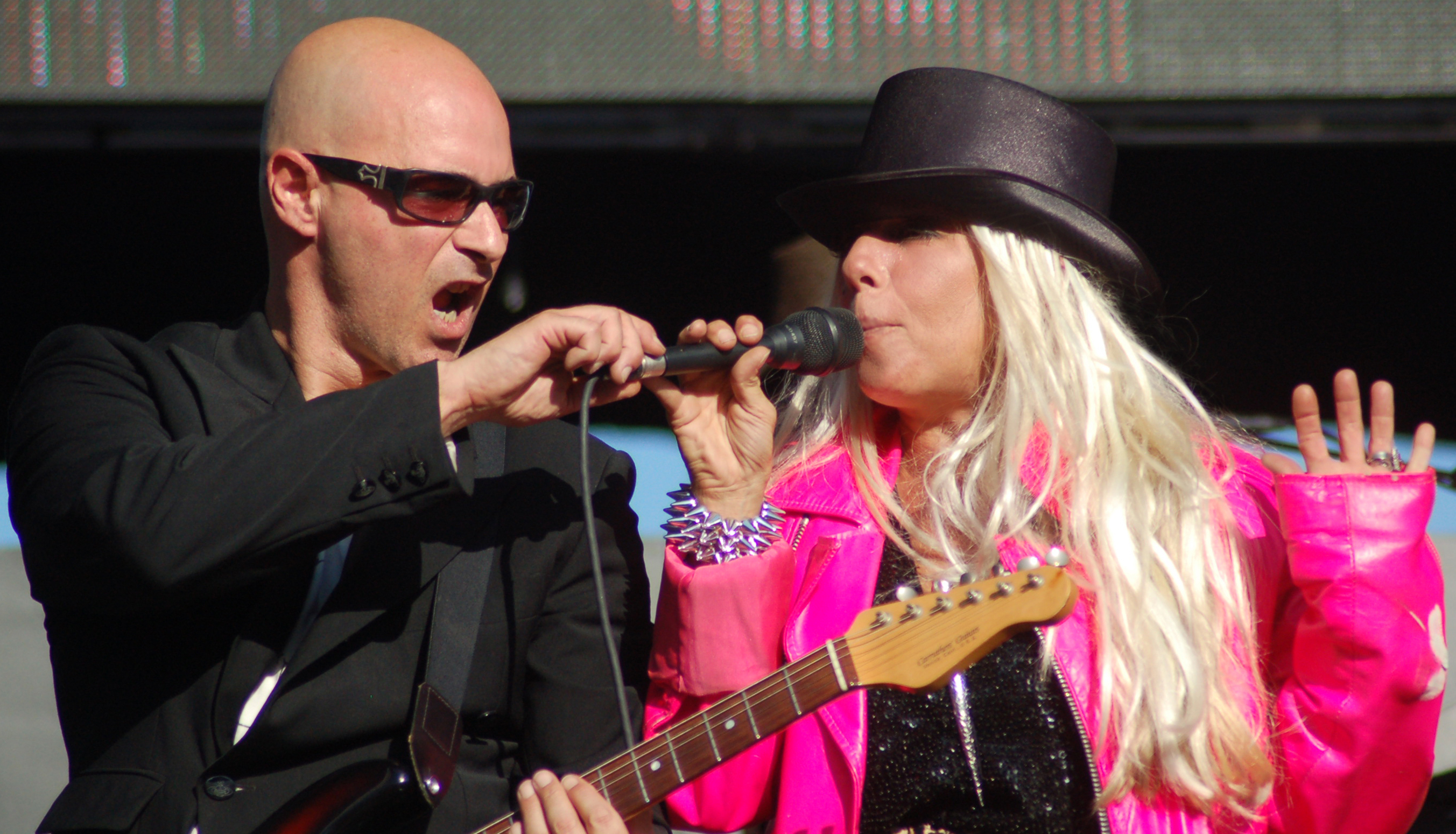
- Bozzio performing with Warren Cuccurullo in 2009

Background information
- Also known as: Dale
- Born: Dale Frances Consalvi; March 2, 1955 (age 71); Medford, Massachusetts, U.S.
- Genres: Rock; new wave; synth-pop
- Occupation: Singer
- Instrument: Vocals
- Years active: 1976–present
- Labels: Paisley Park; Warner Bros.; Capitol; Cleopatra; GRA
- Spouse: Terry Bozzio (m. 1979; div. 1986)

Dale Frances Bozzio (née Consalvi; born March 2, 1955) is an American rock and pop vocalist. She is best known as co-founder and lead singer of the 1980s new wave band Missing Persons and for her work with Frank Zappa. While with Zappa, she performed significant roles in two of his major works, Joe's Garage (1979) and Thing-Fish (1984). Bozzio has released four solo albums and one EP.

She co-founded Missing Persons in 1980 with former Zappa musicians Warren Cuccurullo and Terry Bozzio (her husband from 1979 to 1986). In addition to being the band's lead vocalist, she also contributed lyrics. Missing Persons released one EP and six albums, including Spring Session M (1982), which achieved gold record status.

After Missing Persons disbanded in 1986, Bozzio was signed to Prince's Paisley Park label, which released her first solo album, Riot in English (1988). Bozzio later reformed Missing Persons and continues to perform the band's repertoire at venues across the United States. She also occasionally performs in reunions of the original band and continues her work as a solo artist. In 2014, Bozzio signed to Cleopatra Records and released a new studio album titled Missing in Action. During the summer of 2014, she signed with GRA Records for a new album to be produced by Stephan DeReine.

== Early life ==
Bozzio was born Dale Frances Consalvi in Medford, Massachusetts. She is of Italian descent. From the age of 16, she studied drama at Emerson College and worked as a Bunny at the Playboy Club in Boston. She was named Boston Playboy Club Bunny of the Year in 1975.

In 1976, Bozzio traveled to Playboy Mansion West in Los Angeles at the request of Hugh Hefner to interview for a position as a Valentine party hostess. The opportunity provided for both a continuing relationship with Playboy and for living arrangements in Los Angeles, where she could pursue an acting career. Bozzio rejected the offer. Shortly after, she met and gained employment with Frank Zappa.

Bozzio posed nude for Hustler in a March 1979 edition.

== Life-threatening injury ==
In an interview on the YouTube channel Professor of Rock, and in another interview with Billy Corgan on his YouTube channel The Magnificent Others, Bozzio tells the story of being attacked along with her cousin, and falling out of a window that was not close to the ground. The attack happened at the Holiday Inn in downtown Los Angeles on September 10, 1976, in room 421. The pair was in town for a doctor's appointment to address an asthma attack her cousin had earlier that day. Later that night, three men knocked and attempted to get into their room. After calling the front desk for help, help arrived — or so she thought. The 21-year-old Dale, looking through the peephole, saw a man presenting a badge. She opened the door. To her surprise, the man came inside, got very demanding, and clearly indicated he was associated with the previous guys knocking on her door. She was told that when the others came back, she had better comply with their demands or she would die. Dale essentially said 'no way' and the man started to attack her. While "fighting for her life," Dale ran to the window to scream for help. Dale threw open the window and screamed, but the attack continued. Before she knew it, she found herself outside the window, hanging onto a ledge, then falling. She allegedly hit a classic Holiday Inn sign on the way down. She landed on the cement, cutting her head just above the hairline, breaking a kneecap, cracking her floating ribs, and elbows. The perpetrator then threw her cousin against the wall, left, and was never found again after a considerable effort. That person was not associated with the hotel.

Dale woke up two weeks later in Frank Zappa's living room to Moon Unit Zappa playing the harp. This was just weeks after she finished Joe's Garage with Zappa. Dale was blind and suffering a concussion.

Dale was relocated to a hospital in Boston on life support, where she remained for more than six months, under the watchful eye of her father. To the surprise of doctors, she did not die from blood clots and recovered.

Immediately after her recovery, Frank Zappa invited Dale to join him on a European tour, which she accepted.

According to Dale, the incident inspired lyrics to "Destination Unknown", "Windows", and other songs she did with Missing Persons.

Dale says she forgives her perpetrator.

== With Frank Zappa ==
Zappa hired Bozzio to voice the part of Mary in his rock opera Joe's Garage (1979), which was under development at the time. In that role, she sang about issues such as the Roman Catholic Church, sexuality, and the culture of rock bands. In "Packard Goose", Bozzio, again as the voice of Mary, gave a brief monologue concerning how information, knowledge, wisdom, truth, beauty, love, and music relate to one another, with music as the best.

Bozzio's voice can also be heard in the 1979 film Baby Snakes and in the single "I Don't Wanna Get Drafted" (1980), a criticism of the U.S. military draft policy at that time. "I Don't Wanna Get Drafted" was also included on the album The Lost Episodes (1996).

In 1984, Bozzio was cast in Zappa's musical Thing-Fish. In voicing the part of Rhonda, she played opposite her real-life husband at the time, Terry Bozzio, who voiced the character Harry, Rhonda's husband. In Thing-Fish, Bozzio articulated some of the album's topics such as feminism, female sexuality, young urban professionals, and the state of Broadway musical theater.

In November 1991, participating along with other alumni in Zappa's 50th birthday tribute concert, Zappa's Universe, Dale revised the words in her recitation of her lines in "Packard Goose" to, "Music...and Frank Zappa...are the best."

== Missing Persons ==
Bozzio, along with Zappa touring guitarist Warren Cuccurullo and Terry Bozzio, who had been one of Zappa's drummers, founded Missing Persons in 1980. Missing Persons had multiple hits during the first half of the 1980s and disbanded in 1986, shortly after the release of their third album titled Color in Your Life (1986).

Bozzio continued to record and perform after the breakup of the original Missing Persons band. During the early 1990s, she toured with her own group using the band name and performing Missing Persons songs. In June 2005, Missing Persons featuring Dale Bozzio appeared on week five of the NBC show Hit Me Baby One More Time.

Dale and Missing Persons were referenced in season 2 of the CW TV network show iZombie in 2015. A recurring character played by Jessica Harmon is FBI agent Dale Bozzio, who works on missing persons cases.

Missing Persons released a new studio album, Hollywood Lie, on November 10, 2023.

== Solo career ==
Bozzio's solo album Riot in English was released in 1988 on Prince's Paisley Park Records, under the mononym Dale. The lead single "Simon Simon" reached #33 on the Billboard dance chart.

New Wave Sessions was released on October 9, 2007, on compact disc by Cleopatra Records. The album included new versions of the Missing Persons hits "Words" and "Destination Unknown", and covers of the 1980s songs "Funkytown", "Der Kommissar", "Turning Japanese", "I Know What Boys Like", and "Girls Just Wanna Have Fun".

In 2010, Bozzio's Make Love Not War album and Talk Talk EP was released on Electrik Blue Records.

In 2014, Bozzio's Missing in Action was released on Cleopatra Records.

In 2020, she released her second solo album as Missing Persons titled Dreaming. It mostly covers classic rock/pop songs from the 1960s, 1970s, and 1980s.

== Influences ==
Bozzio was influenced by black and white film era stars including Jean Harlow and Marlene Dietrich. She was also influenced by Judy Garland, and Frank Zappa. For her work with Missing Persons, Bozzio drew inspiration from the screen images of black and white era actresses; however, she incorporated color into her presentation.

Her influence was behind Gelvin Guitars SSM guitar they made specifically for her with a Spring Session M theme to it.

== Personal life ==
During her work with Zappa, she met drummer Terry Bozzio in 1976. They married in 1979 after Terry had become a member of the band U.K. They divorced in 1986, with Dale retaining her married name. She has two children from her marriage to Richard McKenzie.

In 2009, she was convicted of animal cruelty after several dead and malnourished cats were found at her home in Ossipee, New Hampshire while she was touring with her band; she claimed that the caretaker she had hired to stay at her house did not arrive. She was sentenced to 30 days in jail and 250 hours of community service, barred from keeping pets, and ordered to pay a $2700 euthanization bill.

In her 2021 memoir Life Is So Strange, Bozzio wrote that she developed Hashimoto's disease after receiving breast implants. In 2025, her son Troy McKenzie stated in a GoFundMe fundraiser that she was suffering from severe capsular contracture, requiring immediate surgery to remove the implants.

== Discography ==
=== With Frank Zappa ===
- Joe's Garage Act I (1979)
- Joe's Garage Acts II & III (1979)
- Thing-Fish (1984)
- The Lost Episodes (1996)

=== With Missing Persons ===
- Missing Persons EP (1980) No. 46 US
- Spring Session M (1982, 1995) No. 17 US
- Rhyme & Reason (1984, 2000) No. 43 US
- Color in Your Life (1986, 2000) No. 88 US
- The Best of Missing Persons (1987)
- Late Nights Early Days (1998)
- Remixed Hits (1999)
- Lost Tracks (2002)
- Classic Masters: Missing Persons (2002)
- The Best of Missing Persons (10 Best Series) (2002)
- Walking in LA: The Dance Mixes (2006)
- Live from the Danger Zone!: Dale Bozzio & Missing Persons (March 2008, Acadia Records [UK/Europe] and Airline Records [US])
- Missing in Action (2014)
- Dreaming (2020)
- Hollywood Lie (2023)

=== Solo releases ===
- Riot in English (1988)
- New Wave Sessions (2007)
- Talk Talk EP (2010)
- Make Love Not War (2010)

== Filmography and videography ==
=== Filmography ===
- Baby Snakes (1979)
- Lunch Wagon (1981)
- Zappa's Universe (1993)
- US Festival 1983 Days 1-3 (2009)

=== Videography ===
==== Missing Persons ====
- Words (1981)
- Mental Hopscotch (1982)
- Destination Unknown (1982)
- Noticeable One (1983)
- Surrender Your Heart (1984)
- Give (1984)
- Right Now (1984)
- I Can't Think About Dancing (1986)

==== With Frank Sinatra ====
- L.A. is My Lady (1984)

==== Solo ====
- Simon Simon (1988)

==== Guest appearances ====
"Walking in LA" with Lunden Reign (Live at LA Pride Festival - June 7, 2014)
