= Terry Bozzio =

American drummer (born 1950)

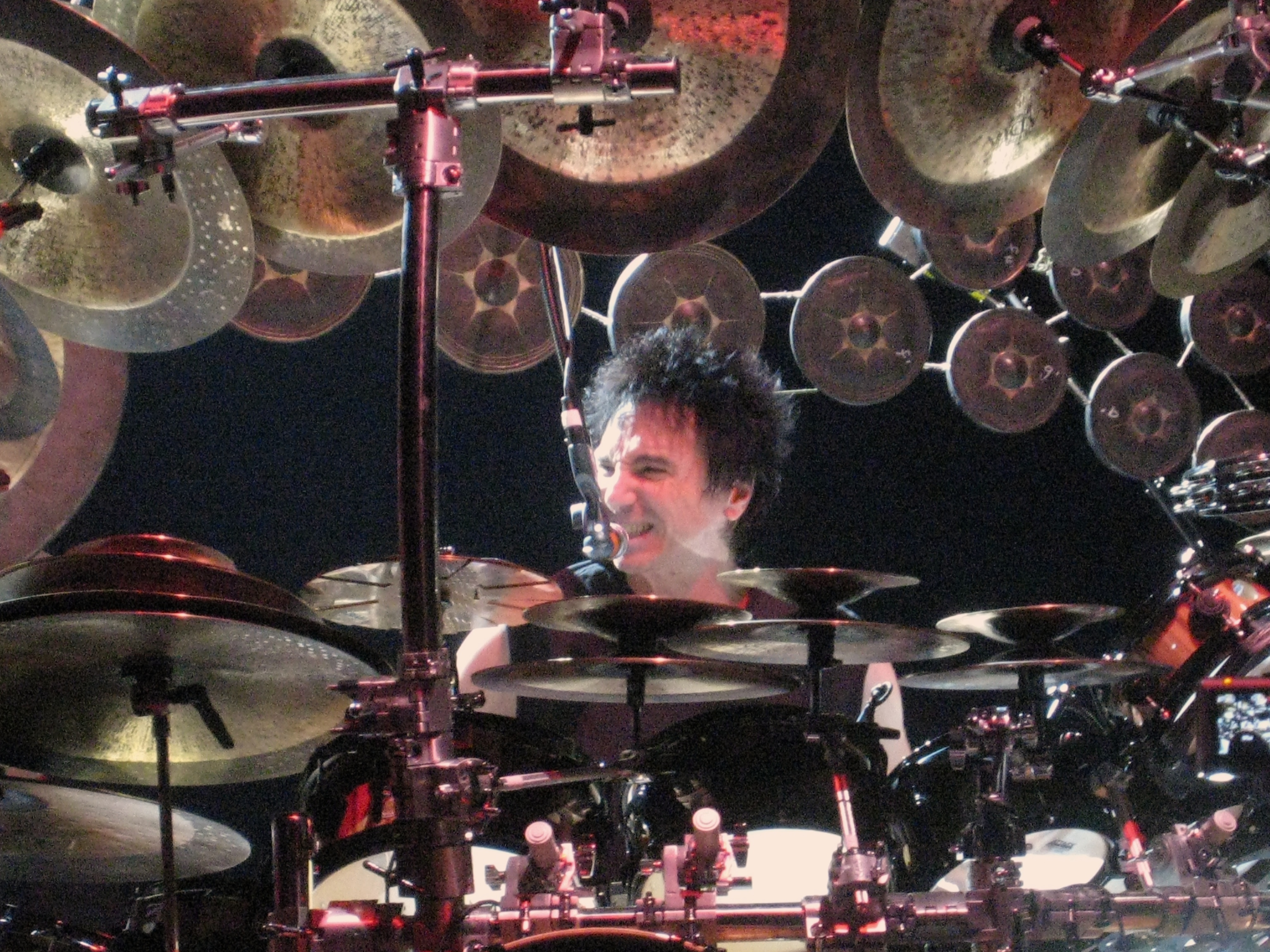
- Bozzio performing in 2006

Background information
- Also known as: Ted Bozzio
- Born: Terry John Bozzio; December 27, 1950 (age 75); San Francisco, California, U.S.
- Genres: Rock; heavy metal; jazz; fusion; synthpop
- Occupation: Musician
- Instruments: Drums; vocals
- Years active: 1972–present
- Member of: Beat
- Formerly of: Frank Zappa band; U.K.; Missing Persons; HoBoLeMa
- Spouse: Dale Consalvi (m. 1979; div. 1986)
- Website: terrybozzio.com

Terry John Bozzio (born December 27, 1950) is an American drummer best known for his work with Missing Persons, U.K., and Frank Zappa. He has been featured on nine solo or collaborative albums, 26 albums with Zappa and five albums with Missing Persons. Bozzio has been a prolific sideman, playing on numerous releases by other artists since the mid-1970s. He was inducted into the Modern Drummer Hall of Fame in 1997.

== Biography ==
Terry Bozzio was born on December 27, 1950 in San Francisco, California. At age six, he started playing makeshift drum sets. At 13, he saw the Beatles' premiere performance on The Ed Sullivan Show and begged his father for drum lessons. He cited Carmine Appice, Mitch Mitchell and Ginger Baker as early influences, and Elvin Jones, Tony Williams, and Eric Gravatt as later influences.

In 1968, Bozzio graduated from Sir Francis Drake High School in San Anselmo, California, where he received a music scholarship award and later went on to the College of Marin. During this time he studied concurrently with Chuck Brown on the drum set and Lloyd Davis and Roland Kohloff on a percussion and timpani scholarship. He also played Bartok-Dahl-Cowell & Baroque chamber ensembles with the Marin and Napa County Symphonies.

=== 1970s ===
In 1972, Bozzio played in the rock musicals Godspell and Walking in my Time. He began playing in local jazz groups with Mike Nock, Art Lande, Azteca, Eddie Henderson, Woody Shaw, Julian Priester, Eric Gravatt, Billy Higgins, Andy Narell and Mel Martin. He became a regular in the Monday Night Jim Dukey Big Band at San Francisco's Great American Music Hall.

Bozzio toured with Frank Zappa between April 1975 and February 1978 and appeared as a drummer and vocalist on a number of Zappa's albums, including Bongo Fury (1975), Zoot Allures (1976), Zappa in New York (1976), Sheik Yerbouti (1979) and Thing-Fish (1984), and in the concert movie Baby Snakes (1979). Bozzio's vocals were prominently featured on a number of Zappa songs, including "Punky's Whips", "Tryin' to Grow a Chin" and "Dong Work for Yuda", making him a key element of the distinctive sound of Zappa's late-1970s work. During live performances of the song "Titties & Beer" between 1976 and 1978, Bozzio would play the character of The Devil, donning a mask and arguing with Zappa's character on stage. Bozzio was also the drummer for whom Zappa wrote The Black Page, originally a solo piece for drums, which became one of the signature compositions of Zappa's career.

In 1977, he joined The Brecker Brothers with longtime San Francisco friend and guitarist Barry Finnerty. With The Brecker Brothers, Bozzio toured and recorded the live album Heavy Metal Be-Bop (1978). Shortly after, he was dismissed by Zappa and joined Group 87 with Mark Isham, Peter Maunu, Patrick O'Hearn and Peter Wolf. The group auditioned for and was signed to a record deal with CBS but Bozzio declined membership and then auditioned unsuccessfully for Thin Lizzy.

After Bill Bruford and Allan Holdsworth departed from the band U.K. in late 1978, Bozzio joined Eddie Jobson and John Wetton to continue U.K. as a trio. The trio recorded Danger Money (1979) and a live album Night After Night (1979) and toured the U.S. and Canada twice (supporting the popular progressive rock band Jethro Tull), and in Europe and Japan.

=== 1980s ===
After U.K. disbanded in early 1980, Bozzio, ex-Zappa guitarist Warren Cuccurullo and then-wife and vocalist Dale Bozzio founded the band Missing Persons. Missing Persons released the albums Spring Session M (which went Gold), Rhyme & Reason, and Color in Your Life.

After Missing Persons broke up in 1986, Bozzio joined ex-Duran Duran guitarist Andy Taylor's solo band. He also played on sessions with Robbie Robertson, Gary Wright, Don Dokken, XYZ, Paul Hyde, Herbie Hancock, Dweezil Zappa, and Richard Marx.

During this time, Bozzio began touring as a clinician/solo drummer and recorded Solo Drums, which was his first instructional video for Warner Brothers. He joined Mick Jagger and Jeff Beck for the video "Throwaway", and teamed up with Beck and keyboardist Tony Hymas to co-write/produce and perform on the Grammy Award-winning album Jeff Beck's Guitar Shop. The album was promoted on The Arsenio Hall Show, which was Jeff Beck's first-ever live appearance on American television.

He also featured on the album Confetti by Sergio Mendes in 1984.

=== 1990s ===
Between 1990 and 1995, Bozzio developed ostinato-based drum solo compositions and recorded his second instructional video Melodic Drumming and the Ostinato Volumes 1, 2, and 3, as well as Solo Drum Music Volumes 1 & 2 on CD. He also joined Tony Hymas, Tony Coe, and Hugh Burns to form the band Lonely Bears and record The Lonely Bears, Injustice, and The Bears Are Running, while living in Paris, France. He also formed the band Polytown with David Torn and Mick Karn. In 1993 Terry joined T. M. Stevens and Devin Townsend on Steve Vai's Sex & Religion album.

From 1995 to 2002, Bozzio did tours of the US, Australia, Canada & Europe as a solo drum artist as well as recording two solo CDs: Drawing the Circle and Chamberworks. He was inducted into the Modern Drummer Hall of Fame in 1997. With bassist/Chapman Stick player Tony Levin and guitarist Steve Stevens, he formed the group Bozzio Levin Stevens, which released two albums: Black Light Syndrome in 1997, and Situation Dangerous in 2000.

=== 2000s ===
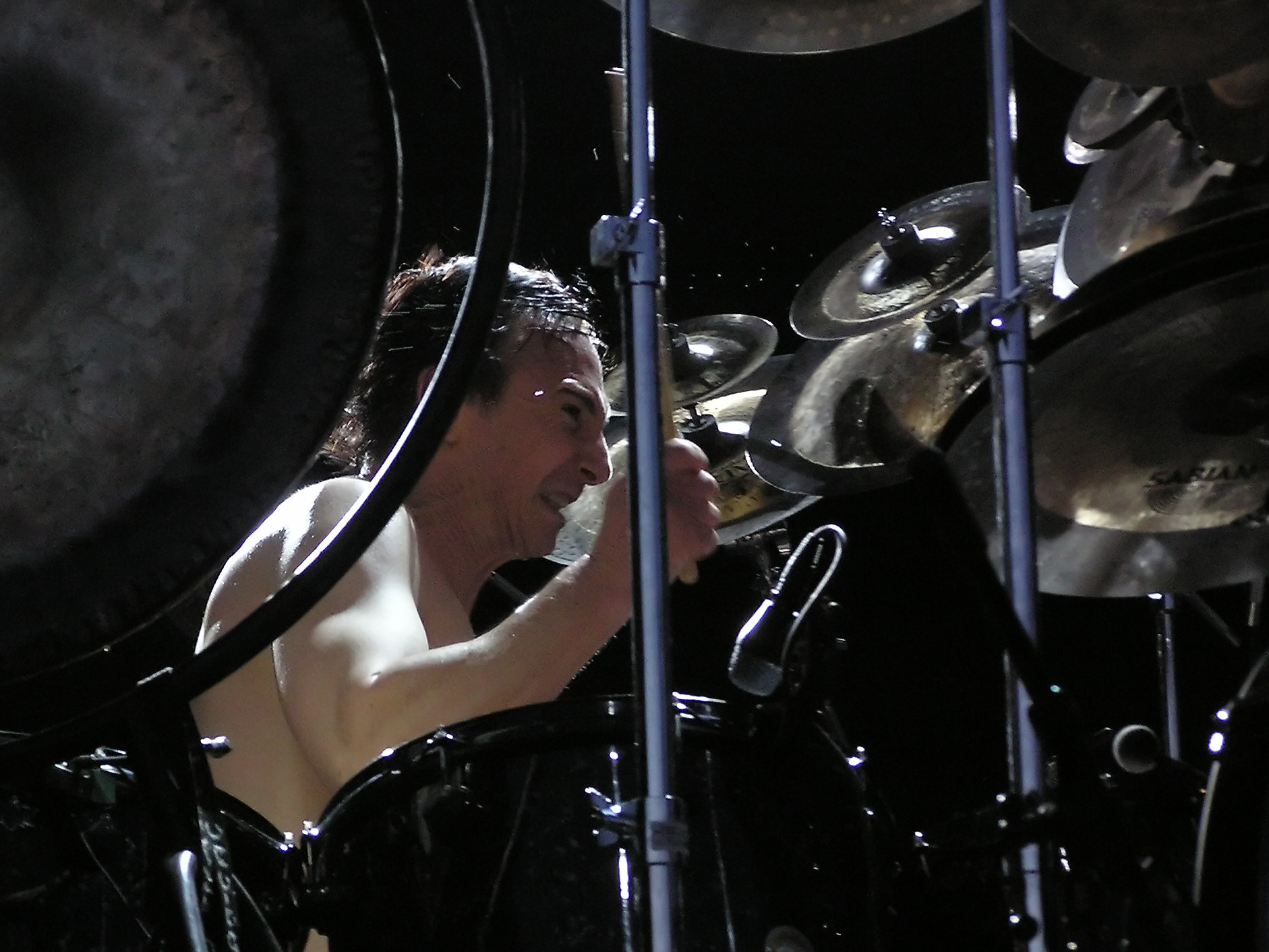
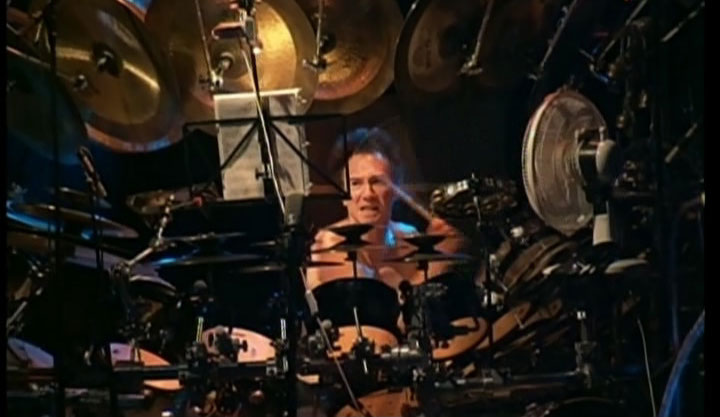
Bozzio performing with Fantômas in 2005

In 2001, he teamed up with Chad Wackerman to produce the Duets video and Alternative Duets CDs. Bozzio won the Clinician of the Year award twice as well as Drum Magazine's Drummer of the Year and Best Clinician. Internationally, he received Slagwerkkrant Magazine's (Netherlands) and Player Magazine's (Japan) Best Drummer Award.

Bozzio was inducted into Guitar Center's RockWalk in Hollywood on January 17, 2007. He worked with the nu metal band Korn on their eighth studio album after the departure of their drummer David Silveria. He was scheduled to play on the road with the band during the Family Values Tour, but he left and was replaced by Joey Jordison of Slipknot and later Ray Luzier.

On August 4th, 2026, it was announced that Bozzio will be joining BEAT (80's King Crimson band) for their 2nd North American tour. He is replacing Danny Carey from Tool due to his commitments to that band.

== Personal life ==
His son Raanen and adopted stepdaughter Marina are also drummers. Raanen has played with a variety of groups, while Marina is a former member of the Japanese metal band Aldious.

== Selected discography ==
=== Solo ===
- Solo Drum Music I (1992)
- Solo Drum Music II (1992)
- Drawing the Circle (1998)
- Chamber Works (1998)
- Solos & Duets (with Chad Wackerman) (2001)
- Nine Short Films (with Billy Sheehan) (2002)
- Chamber Works (2005, with Metropole Orchestra)
- Prime Cuts (2005)
- Four from Ten Twenty Nine (2008)
- Seven Nights in Japan (2008)
- Melodic Drumming & the Ostinato v.1. 2. 3. DVD (2011)
- Terry Bozzio Live Performance & Seminar 2 Disc DVD (rec. 2003) (2011)
- Terry Bozzio Live in Japan 2007 菩慈音 (2012)
- Musical Solo Drumming DVD English w/ Japanese subtitles (2012)
- Terry Bozzio – Composer Series / 4CD + Blu-ray + Blu-ray (Audio-only) + Bonus DVD (2015)
- Terry Bozzio – Reality & Simple Moments Compilation CD (2017)

=== Frank Zappa ===
- Bongo Fury (October 1975), US No. 66
- Zoot Allures (October 1976), US No. 71
- Zappa in New York (March 1977), US No. 57
- Studio Tan (1978)
- Sleep Dirt (January 1979), US No. 175
- Sheik Yerbouti (March 1979), US No. 21
- Joe's Garage (September 1979), US No. 27 (vocals only)
- Orchestral Favorites (1979)
- Shut Up 'n Play Yer Guitar (May 1981)
- Baby Snakes (March 1983)
- Thing-Fish (November 1984)
- You Can't Do That on Stage Anymore, Vol. 1 (May 1988)
- You Can't Do That on Stage Anymore, Vol. 3 (November 1989)
- You Can't Do That on Stage Anymore, Vol. 4 (July 1991)
- You Can't Do That on Stage Anymore, Vol. 5 (July 1992)
- You Can't Do That on Stage Anymore, Vol. 6 (July 1992)
- Läther (September 1996)
- Frank Zappa Plays the Music of Frank Zappa: A Memorial Tribute (October 1996)
- The Lost Episodes (1996)
- FZ:OZ (August 2002)
- QuAUDIOPHILIAc (September 2004)
- Trance-Fusion (October 2006)
- One Shot Deal (June 2008)
- Joe's Menage (October 2008)
- Philly '76 (December 2009)
- Hammersmith Odeon (November 2010)
- Baby Snakes: The Compleat Soundtrack (December 2012)
- Joe's Camouflage (2013)
- Halloween 77 (October 2017)
- Zappa in New York 40th Anniversary (March 2019)
- Zappa ’75: Zagreb / Ljubljana (October 2022)
- Bongo Fury 50th Anniversary (March 2026)
- Zoot Allures 50th Anniversary (December 2026)

=== Missing Persons ===
- Missing Persons EP (1980) No. 46 US
- Spring Session M (1982) No. 17 US
- Rhyme & Reason (1984) No. 43 US
- Color in Your Life (1986) No. 88 US
- Late Nights Early Days (1999)
- Lost Tracks (2002)

=== U.K. ===
- Danger Money (1979)
- Night After Night (1979, Live)

=== Dweezil Zappa ===
- Back to the Beach Soundtrack (on "Wipe Out") with Herbie Hancock (1987)
- My Guitar Wants to Kill Your Mama (1988)
- Shampoohorn (1994)
- Automatic (2000)

=== Other ===
- 1974: Born to Love You Luis Gasca
- 1977: Deceptive Bends 10CC
- 1978: Heavy Metal Be-Bop Brecker Brothers
- 1980: Only Love Can Sustain Luis Alberto Spinetta
- 1980: Group 87 Group 87
- 1986: Andy Taylor Andy Taylor
- 1987: Robbie Robertson Robbie Robertson
- 1988: Castalia Mark Isham
- 1988: Rivers Gonna Rise Patrick O'Hearn
- 1988: Who I Am Gary Wright
- 1989: Def, Dumb and Blonde Deborah Harry
- 1989: El Dorado Patrick O'Hearn
- 1989: How Long Michael Thompson
- 1989: Jeff Beck's Guitar Shop Jeff Beck & Tony Hymas
- 1989: Twins Soundtrack Jeff Beck
- 1990: Girlfriend from Hell Jorgenson
- 1990: Mark Isham Mark Isham
- 1991: Beckology Jeff Beck
- 1991: In Your Face Earl Slick
- 1991: Rush Street Richard Marx
- 1992: Retrograde Planet Zazen
- 1992: Vol. Pour Sydney Lonely Bears
- 1992: White Sands Soundtrack Patrick O'Hearn
- 1993: Sex and Religion Steve Vai
- 1994: Big Bang: In the Beginning Was a Drum Compilation
- 1994: Hide Your Face hide
- 1994: Polytown Polytown
- 1995: First Signs of Life Gary Wright
- 1995: Thank You Duran Duran
- 1995: Trust Patrick O'Hearn
- 1997: Black Light Syndrome Bozzio Levin Stevens
- 1997: Dream Castles Sly
- 1997: Something with a Pulse Mark Craney & Friends
- 1998: Age of Impact Explorer's Club
- 1998: Best of the Lonely Bears Lonely Bears
- 1998: Proof: The Very Best of the Knack The Knack
- 1998: Zoom The Knack
- 1999: Lonely Bears Lonely Bears
- 2000: Injustice Lonely Bears
- 2000: Situation Dangerous Bozzio Levin Stevens
- 2000: The Bears Are Running Lonely Bears
- 2001: Compression Billy Sheehan
- 2001: Feeding the Wheel Jordan Rudess
- 2002: Big Delta Omar & The Howlers
- 2002: Delete and Roll Bozzio Preinfalk & Machacek (BPM)
- 2002: Queen of the Damned Soundtrack Jonathan Davis, Richard Gibbs
- 2002: Raising the Mammoth Explorers Club
- 2003: Bozzio – Mastelotto with Pat Mastelotto
- 2004: Alamo Soundtrack Carter Burwell
- 2004: Boogie Man Omar & The Howlers
- 2004: Drum Nation, Vol. 1 Various Artists
- 2005: Two Sides of If Vivian Campbell
- 2006: Sic Alex Machacek
- 2007: Untitled Korn
- 2008: Live with the Tosca Strings (DVD)
- 2012: Efrainization Terry Bozzio/Alex Acuna/Efrain Toro (DVD)
- 2016: Heavy Metal Be-Bop Band Tour in Japan '14 Brecker Brothers (Reunion CD)
