= Chicanery =

Chicanery is a form of deception involving trickery or subterfuge.

Chicanery may also refer to:

== Film and TV ==
- Chicanery, 2015 film by Charles Dennis
- "Chicanery" (Better Call Saul), 2017 television episode

== Music ==
- Chicanery (band), American experimental rock band active from the 2000s to the 2020s
  - Chicanery (album), 2010 album by the band
- Chicanery, 2019 album by Hesitation Wounds
- "Chicanery, a song by Moka Only from the 2015 album Magickal Weirdness

== Other ==
- Chicanery: A Collection of Original Poems, 2003 poetry collection by Cate Marvin
