= Neil Carlill =

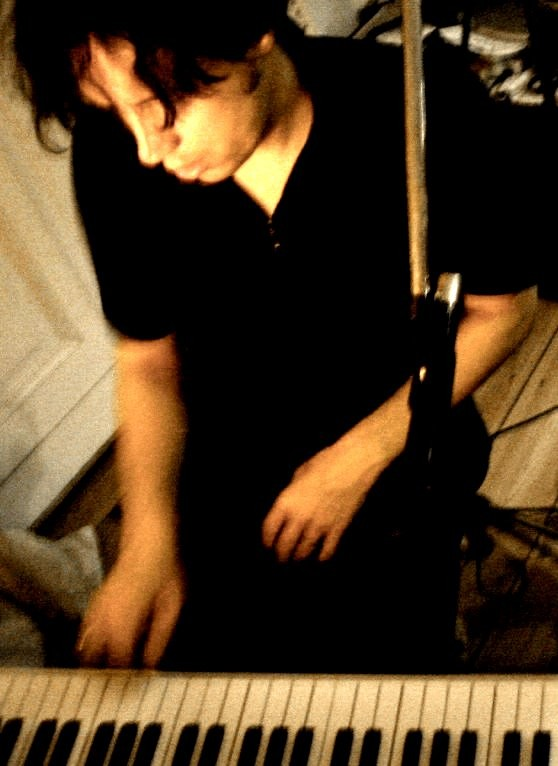
- Neil Carlill in Berlin, 2009

Background information
- Born: 20 March 1967 (age 59)
- Genres: Experimental rock, alternative rock, ambient, electronic
- Occupations: Singer, lyricist, poet, guitarist
- Instruments: vocals, guitar, bass, ukulele, keyboards, synthesizer, harmonica
- Years active: 1993 – present
- Labels: Starfish, Viper, Island, Stilll, Herb Recordings

Neil Carlill (born 20 March 1967 in Ripon, England), is an English singer, lyricist, poet, composer, and musician. He is known for his work with experimental and alternative rock bands including 1990s UK acts Delicatessen and Lodger, and more recently with bands and collaborations including Vedette, Shoosh, 5 Little Elephants, Me Me the Moth, Chicanery, and Three on a Match. His lyrics reflect the influence of DaDa and James Joyce, and his voice has a unique, multifaceted, "strangely alluring" character.

Carlill founded the group Delicatessen in Leicester, England in 1993, and joined the British supergroup Lodger in 1998. Both groups charted in the UK, with Lodger's single, I'm Leaving, charting in the top 40. Lodger disbanded after one album, 1998's A Walk in the Park. Delicatessen, having released three critically acclaimed albums, broke up in late 2002.

During the late 1990s, Carlill also contributed to TV Mania, a side project of Duran Duran members Nick Rhodes and Warren Cuccurullo.

Having relocated to the United States in 2000, Neil Carlill temporarily slowed his musical output until, in 2004, he resumed working with Warren Cuccurullo, this time on the eponymous debut album from the project titled Chicanery. During this period he also founded the bands Vedette, Shoosh, 5 Little Elephants, Me Me the Moth, and Three on a Match through collaborations with numerous musicians in the US and Europe.

He has also developed a solo project dubbed Airport Studies, and performs live under the pseudonym Harvey Mapcase. As Airport Studies, Carlill contributed a song for the Fire Records James Joyce Tribute album, Chamber Music (James Joyce). Under his own name Carlill was a featured vocalist on Lost-Wax (2008 Plush) by Lena and the Floating Roots Orchestra. Some of Neil Carlill's written work was also published in 2007 in Galleon (Volume 1, Number 1), a literary journal that features adventurous short fiction.

== Delicatessen ==
Delicatessen was formed by Neil Carlill (vocals, guitar, keyboards), Craig Bown (guitar, flute), Pete Capewell (bass) and Stuart Dayman (drums), taking their moniker from the 1991 French film. They started in Leicester, England in 1993 and while playing shows in London they were spotted by manager Tony Beard, and soon started to garner support from the Melody Maker and much of the UK music press. After signing to Starfish Records, the Indie offshoot of Jazz Summers' Big Life Publishing, their debut single Inviting Both Sisters Out To Dinner was released in October 1994, followed by the single C.F. Kane in April 1995. In a Melody Maker review of C.F. Kane, the reviewer placed Delicatessen in the class of bands that were "influenced by good books or good films, rather than just their late-Sixties record collections." Subsequently, their single, "I'm Just Alive" charted. Delicatessen also created the soundtrack to the Independent short film George and Ramona (starring Emily Dux and Gary Lydon, written by David Hill and Mika Kallwass) that was released in 1995.

The first album, Skin Touching Water, was released to stellar reviews in May 1995. Melody Maker called the band "The salvation of pop music". Early in 1995, bassist Pete Capewell left and was replaced by the multi-instrumentalist Will Foster. That summer saw Delicatessen headlining the 3rd stage at Reading Festival, and the addition of Jonny Wood on keyboards, percussion, backing vocals, and violin. With their live band complete, they toured in the Netherlands, Germany and France, and were featured at the Phoenix Festival in 1995. The second album Hustle into Bed, characterised as a darker, more orchestral work, was issued in 1996, produced by longtime Nick Cave and the Bad Seeds and The Birthday Party producer/engineer Tony Cohen. After a great deal more touring there was a brief hiatus in which the Lodger 'supergroup' came about, and then Delicatessen reappeared in early 1998 with a new label, Viper Records, and a third album, There's No Confusing Some People. Carlill and Foster then continued with the Lodger project for the rest of 1998. Following Lodger's split, Carlill emigrated to the US, and despite attempts by him, Bown, and Dayman to keep recording, Delicatessen finally called it quits late in 2002.

Delicatessen recorded two sessions for John Peel's BBC Radio 1 show, both in 1995. The first was a four track studio session and the second six tracks recorded at the Reading Festival.

== Lodger ==
After the completion of Delicatessen's second album, Neil Carlill and Will Foster joined forces with Pearl Lowe, who had fronted the Britpop band Powder, and Danny Goffey of Supergrass to form one of the most noteworthy of Britpop superbands, Lodger.

Signed to Island Records, Lodger released a 3 track single in 1997. Its a-side, "I'm Leaving", received heavy radio exposure nationally, and the single entered the UK singles charts in the top 40. Sometime thereafter came the album A Walk in the Park. From that album, "Always Round Here" and "Small Change" also charted. The videos produced for "I'm Leaving" and the subsequent singles were highly praised in the media for their humour and originality. It is for these same qualities that Lodger's A Walk in the Park is considered an important release for 1990's British music. Lodger toured the UK in 1998 and played at that summer's Reading Festival.

== Vedette ==
Vedette began life in Los Angeles at the end of the Chicanery recordings, during which Carlill made the acquaintance of electronic artist Manuel Stagars. The pair conceived an album of bizarre musical sketches derived from ambient recordings of Stagars, which were cut to song length with Carlill adding inspired vocal concoctions laced with surrealist touches and evocatively weird lyrics. Warren Cuccurullo also contributed his singular guitar stylings to several tracks, and Carlill played ukulele and keyboards on select songs. Vedette's self-titled debut album was released on the Stilll label (Belgium) in 2007.

External videos
- They're Only Gardening (2006) by Vedette (Official Video)

jayrope joined Vedette in 2008 for a series of concerts in Germany which culminated in an appearance at the Donau Musical Festival in Austria.

More European shows followed in 2009 with the highlight being their talked-about performance at the Klangbad Festival in Scheer, Germany, with the pared-down line-up of Carlill and jayrope. Recording of the second album is in progress.

== 5 Little Elephants ==
Carlill teamed up with French musician Charles-Eric Charrier for two albums recorded in 2007 and 2009. The first album is a collection of voice, percussion and noise using acoustic guitar to produce an otherworldly collection of folk abstraction. The second album is one forty-seven-minute song, featuring an epic narrative written and sung by Carlill. 5 Little Elephants' music has been referred to as unconventional hybrid pop with an intimate and beautiful mature, poetic scope. Both albums are being prepared for release.

== Shoosh ==
In 2007, Neil Carlill joined Ed Drury (guitars) and Craig Murphy (synthesizers) to become the third member of Shoosh. Drury and Murphy were impressed with both Carlill's lyric writing style and his vocal delivery. The project pairs folk influenced ambient music with Carlill's Dadaist lyrics and his "unique, other-worldly vocal style."

Shoosh contributed two tracks to a split album with another group, Cheju, in November 2007. The album, titled Cheju & Shoosh was released on the Awkward Silence label with a limited edition run of 300 CDs. Subsequently, the three released the album Orphem Circuit in 2008. An Igloo Magazine review described that album as "a sweltering sheet of low flying beauty," and an "Is This Music?" review explained the music as, "Soundscapes of uncomfortable beauty Pulses Dadaist in theory and practice..."

== Chicanery ==
The history of Chicanery extends back to the late 1990s in London, England. During his long stint as guitarist for Duran Duran, Warren Cuccurullo conceived a side project called TV Mania with bandmate Nick Rhodes. The duo were searching for a lead vocalist to front the endeavour when, while working in the studio, they heard the voice of Neil Carlill, lead singer of the group Delicatessen, emanating from the television, on which one of that band's music videos was being broadcast. Cuccurullo found Carlill through the group's record label, and invited him to record with them at the studio. TV Mania was not commercially released at that time, but that meeting marked the beginning of a long-standing and currently active collaboration between Neil and Warren. When Cuccurullo relocated to Los Angeles after his time with Duran Duran ended in 2001, he reestablished contact with Carlill and exchanged with him demos of their latest music. With each deriving great inspiration from the other's work, and seeing the potential for a brilliant album, the two men met up in LA for the sessions that would result in Chicanery, the album. The bulk of the tracks on the debut album were cut in Los Angeles' Red Rum Studios in 2005, while some of the music was done back in Massachusetts. A portion of the material Cuccurullo had recorded with Ustad Sultan Khan back in 1998 was used on one track, "Cut Me from the Mirror". Often, tracks would be recorded at respective home studios and conveyed to producer Simone Sello, before moving on to yet another, larger studio for post-recording and mixing to perfect the finished product. Chicanery, an energetic, diverse and somewhat genre-busting collection of avant-garde pop tunes, was released 11 May 2010. Carlill credits this period with the advent of some of his finest songwriting efforts to date, which are evidenced on the Chicanery tracks "Midnight Owls", "Hit the Wall", "IOD", and "Luminal Dark".

== Me Me the Moth ==
External videos
- In the Air Blind (2008) by Me Me The Moth (Official Video)

This project is a collaboration between Carlill and musician/artist Marcelo Radulovich, who previously worked with David J and Mike Keneally, among others. Their self-produced debut album The Weirding Valley contains fourteen songs constructed via the internet, with tracks recorded by Neil in Salem, MA, and by Marcelo in Cardiff, CA. The process involved the exchanging of sound files, which were subsequently united at Radulovich's home studio. Taking inspiration from the best of the Fluxus movement, The Weirding Valley is described as a tapestry woven of DADA-esque sensibilities. Shades of Wire, Pere Ubu and Beefheart are apparent. The album was released in May 2010. Four videos were made by Radulovich for the songs "The Red Radio", "Hounds Are Sleepy", "In the Air Blind" and the album's title track "The Weirding Valley".

== Airport Studies and Harvey Mapcase ==
Carlill used the name Airport Studies for his track on the Fire Records James Joyce tribute album Chamber Music (James Joyce) in 2008. The tribute album draws upon James Joyce's collection of poems titled Chamber Music, and sets all thirty six poems to music. Carlill selected Poem XI for his contribution and explained, "When I was asked to contribute to the Chamber Music album for Fire Records I was immediately drawn to Poem XI. The sexual conquest of a virgin is suggested in a bygone language of an earlier era that romantically evades the real facts of the matter. I tried to make the music slither a little, to pretend to sleaze but to support the almost polite nature of lines such as "Happy love has come to woo"." The track was produced by jayrope.

Harvey Mapcase is a fake name Carlill uses for live solo shows.

== Three on a Match ==
Three on a Match is a songwriting project by Carlill, Jeff Mellin, and Jamal River, who uses the name King Toad. Having met in 1995, Carlill and Mellin shared an appreciation of old Hollywood movies and discussed collaborating on a project. The idea for their album came from a box set of Bette Davis films that Mellin owned. They selected Three on a Match, from the Bette Davis movie of that name, as the name of the album. Since there were three main characters associated with the superstition that was central to the movie's plot, Carlill and Mellin decided they needed a third contributor. Carlill recruited singer and songwriter King Toad.

The album contains thirteen songs, all with their titles and inspiration from Bette Davis' filmography. The genre is categorised as alt/folk and acoustic pop with each of the members having written a set of songs for the album.

The CD for Three on a Match was released on Stereorrific Recordings on 26 May 2011 at the Gulu Gulu Café in Salem, Massachusetts. The limited-edition CD designed by Mellin is packaged in a film canister-like container that houses the CD, a twenty eight-page booklet, and a set of "imagined movie stills" starring Niki Luparelli photographed by John Soares, and liner notes by Garrett Caples. The album was also released as custom Three on a Match matchboxes containing download codes. To commemorate Bette Davis' 103rd birthday, the album was pre-released via download on 5 April 2011. A music video by Mellin and Soares for one of Mellin's tracks, Dark Victory, also starring Luparelli, was selected for Philadelphia Independent Film Festival.

About writing the songs for the project Carlill said, "I really tried to evoke the themes and characters, and to echo how the films make me feel. Bette Davis has such an amazing screen presence, it feels very natural to write through her performances."

== Influences and artistic development ==
Neil Carlill is inspired by James Joyce, Captain Beefheart, Max Ernst, the DaDaists, Kurt Schwitters, Alfred Jarry, Hannah Höch, and Georges Perec.

Concerning his writing lyrics, he has stated in one interview, "...it's a connection to the sub-conscious a side-stepping of the rational brain to let what's in you spiritually manifest itself in your creative medium. I mess with words as they come flying out of my brain uninvited. I think it's more like prose-poetry sometimes, hypertext, concentrated meaning in a seemingly abstract construction. It can be a little puzzling but there is a narrative but not in the literal sense we are used to... You have to absorb and translate..."; and in another, "...you have to make the words count, but the order in which you put them is the really fun time. It's all code, puzzles, concentrated meaning. It has a surreal coloring but it's much less random than you'd expect."

About how his writing style has changed over the years, he has said, "...I began with a much more structured style of writing that fit the conventional pop song structure, I think within that structure you can create puzzles and language is a beautiful instrument to manipulate in this way. I have tried to move into more abstract, DADA territory with some of the later work, the meaning becomes coded like hypertext. The narrative is back to front or a zig-zag pattern of small movies. Tone Poet is a balance that can be achieved between narrative and nonsense, they're interchangeable and I really have no idea sometimes what is going to happen until I sing, it's instinctive mostly but occasionally the words are written down randomly and call to you in a sequence that fits."

== Discography ==
=== Delicatessen ===
Albums

- Skin Touching Water (1995, Starfish)
- Hustle into Bed (1996, Starfish)
- There's No Confusing Some People (1998, Viper)

Singles

- Inviting Both Sisters To Dinner (1994 Starfish)
- C.F. Kane (1995 Starfish)
- I'm Just Alive (1995 Starfish)
- Monkey Suit (1996 Starfish)

=== Lodger ===
Album

- A Walk in the Park (1998 Island Records)

Singles

- I'm Leaving (1997 Island Records)
- Always Round Here (1997 Island Records)
- Small Change e.p. (1997 Island Records)

=== Vedette ===
Album

- Vedette (2007 Stilll)
- I slept moments for you (2012 Herb Recordings)

=== 5 Little Elephants ===
Single from compilation album

- Dawn on the morning drive from album Mixtape 01 (2010 Twin Daisies Records)

Album

- 5 Little Elephants CD (2012 Twin Daisies Records)
- 5 Little Elephants cassette (2013 Haute Magie)

=== Shoosh ===
Album

- Orpheum Circuit (2008 Herb Recordings)

Single

- Split single Cheju/Shoosh (2008 Awkward Silence)

=== Chicanery ===
Album

- Chicanery (2010)

Singles

- Hubert Selby Song (2010)
- Gold Pavilions (2010)

=== Me Me the Moth ===
Album

- The Weirding Valley (2010 dPulse Recordings)

=== Airport Studies ===
Album On Compilation

- XI Chamber Music: James Joyce (2008 Fire Records)

=== Three On A Match ===
- Burnt Offerings: A Preview of Three On A Match (2011 independent)
- Three On A Match (2011 Steroerrific Recordings)

== Videography and filmography ==
=== Delicatessen ===
- George and Ramona soundtrack to the short film (1995 independent)
- C.F. Kane (Skin Touching Water – 1995 Starfish)
- I'm Just Alive (Skin Touching Water – 1995 Starfish)
- Chomsky (Skin Touching Water – 1995 Starfish)
- Buy A Chance To Breathe (Hustle Into Bed 1996 Starfish)
- Vanilla Folders (Hustle Into Bed – 1996 Starfish)
- Monkey Suit (Hustle Into Bed – 1996 Starfish)

=== Lodger ===
- Small Change (A Walk in the Park 1998 Island Records)
- I’m Leaving (A Walk in the Park 1998 Island Records)
- Always Round Here (A Walk in the Park 1998 Island Records)

=== Vedette ===
- They’re Only Gardening (2006)
- His Arm Glowing (2009)

=== Shoosh ===
- Elastic Soil by Marcin Czajka (Myppa)
- Snake Eyes
- Come In From The Cold
- Pestilence

=== Chicanery ===
- Cut Me From the Mirror

=== Me Me the Moth ===
- The Weirding Valley [HQ] (2008)
- The Red Radio (2008)
- In the Air Blind (2008)
- Hounds are Sleepy (2008)
