= Chicanery (album) =

Studio album by Chicanery
- Released: 2010
- Genre: Experimental rock, progressive rock
- Length: 47:54
- Producer: Simone Sello

Chicanery is the debut album of the band Chicanery, a collaboration between Warren Cuccurullo (Frank Zappa, Missing Persons, and Duran Duran); and Neil Carlill (Delicatessen and Lodger). The album was released simultaneously in North America and Europe on May 11, 2010. Chicanery was made available in CD and digital formats in America and in digital format initially in Europe. The debut single, "Hubert Selby Song", that draws from the life and works of American writer Hubert Selby Jr., was released, along with "Gold Pavilions" as an extra track on iTunes on April 27, 2010.

Neil Carlill first met Warren Cuccurullo in England in the late 1990s. Carlill was a guest on the TV Mania project that was created by both Cuccurullo and Nick Rhodes of Duran Duran. A number of years after both Cuccurullo and Carlill relocated to the U.S., they began work on Chicanery.

Musicians who have provided support on the album include Terry Bozzio, whose work with Cuccurullo extends back to the late 1970s with Frank Zappa, Joe Travers, also a Frank Zappa alumnus, renowned sarangi virtuoso Ustad Sultan Khan, and multi-instrumentalist and producer Simone Sello. Additional guest musicians include Stuart Dayman, Bizarro Patanè, Damon Muldavin, and Manuel Stagars.

== Track listing ==
Songs written by Warren Cuccurullo and Neil Carlill, except where noted.

1. "The Rung Below" (Cuccurullo/Carlill/Simone Sello) – 4:21
2. "Hubert Selby Song" (Cuccurullo/Carlill/Simone Sello) – 3:57
3. "The Midnight Owls" (Carlill) – 4:02
4. "Ice Page Repo" – 4:31
5. "Solid Gold Helicopter" (Cuccurullo/Carlill/Simone Sello) – 2:48
6. "Alien Chant" (Cuccurullo/Carlill/Simone Sello) – 3:10
7. "Cut Me from the Mirror" – 4:13
8. "I.O.D." (Carlill) – 3:51
9. "Chessmaniaques" (Cuccurullo/Carlill/Manuel Stagars) – 2:42
10. "I Came Back to You" – 3:49
11. "Luminal Dark" (Carlill) – 3:30
12. "Gold Pavilions" (Cuccurullo/Carlill/Simone Sello) – 3:00
13. "Hit the Wall" (Carlill) – 4:07

== Personnel ==
- Neil Carlill - vocals, acoustic guitar, synth, keyboards, harmonica, bass, ukulele
- Warren Cuccurullo - guitars, vocals, percussion, v-drums, loops, tapes, electronics
- Terry Bozzio - drums
- Simone Sello - rhythm guitar, bass, mellotron, synths, violin, vocoder, programming
- Joe Travers - drums, v-drums
- Ustad Sultan Khan - sarangi, vocals

=== Additional guest musicians ===
- Stuart Dayman - drums
- Bizarro Patanè - bass
- Damon Muldavin - percussion
- Manuel Stagars - tapes, keyboards, drum machines

== Production ==
- Producer: Simone Sello
- Engineer: Fabio Angelini
- Mastering: Mike Pachelli
- Creative Consultant: Jarrell Pair
- Album Artwork Design and Layout: Jeff Mellin
- Album Cover Photo: Tim Mahoney
