= Inhaler (disambiguation) =

An inhaler is a device used for delivering medication into the body via the lungs.

Inhaler may also refer to:

- Inhaler (album), by Tad, 1993
- "Inhaler", song by Hooverphonic, from the album A New Stereophonic Sound Spectacular, 1996
- "Inhaler", song by Cordelia's Dad, from the album What It Is, 2002
- "Inhaler" (Miles Kane song), released only as a single, 2010
- "Inhaler" (Foals song), from the album Holy Fire, 2012
- Inhaler (band), Irish band
