= Rearrange (Miles Kane song) =

Single by Miles Kane

from the album Colour of the Trap
- B-side: "Morning Comes"
- Released: 25 March 2011
- Recorded: 2010
- Genre: Indie rock
- Length: 3:30
- Label: Sony Music Entertainment UK Limited
- Songwriters: Alex Turner; Miles Kane

Miles Kane singles chronology
"Come Closer" (2011)	"Rearrange" (2011)	"First of My Kind" (2012)

"Rearrange" is a song by the English musician Miles Kane from his debut studio album Colour of the Trap. It was released on 25 March 2011 as a Digital download in the United Kingdom. It has peaked to number 149 on the UK Singles Chart. A remix by popular dubstep producer Skream was also included on the single's digital release.

== Music video ==
A music video to accompany the release of "Rearrange" was first released onto YouTube on 31 March 2011.

== Track listing ==
Digital download - Single
No.	Title	Length
1.	"Rearrange"	3:31

Digital download - EP
No.	Title	Length
1.	"Rearrange"	3:30
2.	"Morning Comes"	3:47
3.	"Rearrange" (Skreamix)	4:42
4.	"Rearrange" (Music video)	3:26

== Chart performance ==
Chart (2011)	Peak position
Belgium (Ultratip Bubbling Under Flanders)	3
Belgium (Ultratip Bubbling Under Wallonia)	29
UK Singles (The Official Charts Company)	149

== Release history ==
Region	Date	Format	Label
United Kingdom	25 March 2011	Digital download	Sony Music Entertainment
United Kingdom	29 April 2011	Digital download	Sony Music Entertainment
