= Daisy Lowe =

British model (born 1989)

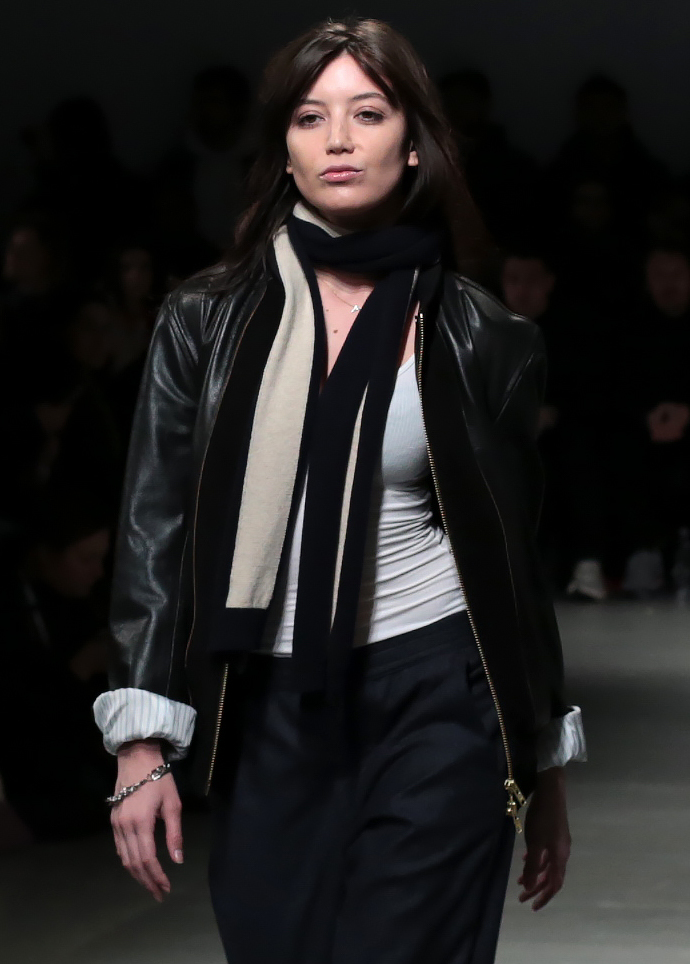
- Lowe in 2018
- Born: Daisy Rebecca Lowe; 27 January 1989 (age 37); Westminster, London, England
- Occupation: Fashion model
- Years active: 1991–present
- Spouse: Jordan Saul (m. 2025)
- Children: 2
- Parent(s): Gavin Rossdale (father); Pearl Lowe (mother)
- Modelling information
- Height: 5 ft 10 in (1.78 m)
- Hair colour: Brown
- Eye colour: Hazel
- Agency: ZZO (Paris); Elite Model Management (Milan, London)

Daisy Rebecca Lowe (born 27 January 1989) is an English fashion model who has modelled for editorial photo shoots, commercial advertising campaigns and fashion shows. She is the daughter of Pearl Lowe, the singer-songwriter turned textile and fashion designer, and Gavin Rossdale, lead singer of the rock band Bush.

== Early life ==
Lowe was born in Westminster, London, England, on 27 January 1989. She grew up in Primrose Hill, North London, and stayed with grandparents to continue her education at South Hampstead High School, when her mother, Pearl Lowe, moved to Hampshire. Lowe has two younger half-brothers and a half-sister from her mother's marriage to Danny Goffey: Alfie, Frankie, and Betty. She also has three younger half-brothers from her father's marriage to Gwen Stefani: Kingston, Zuma, and Apollo. She is Jewish.

Until 2004, Lowe was believed to be the daughter of Pearl Lowe's ex-lover Bronner Handwerger, but a paternity test revealed that her godfather, Bush singer/guitarist Gavin Rossdale, was her biological father. Her mother Pearl Lowe wrote about the situation in her book All That Glitters.

== Career ==
Lowe began modelling at the age of two, and did some photoshoots when she was 12 and 14 years old. At 15, she was approached by a talent scout in Camden Town and she signed with Select, a London modelling agency.

In February 2006, Lowe was featured in Vogue Italia, shot by New York photographer Steven Klein, who also shot her in March 2007 for a W magazine pictorial called "Xurbia". In September 2006, Lowe modelled for the Urban Outfitters catalogue, appeared in French Connection printed advertisements and was profiled in British Harper's Bazaar. She was featured in an editorial in Jane magazine alongside fellow model Lydia Hearst-Shaw in March 2007, appeared in Vogue Italia for the second time in May and, in August, posed nude on the cover of i-D magazine with her then-partner, Will Cameron of the band Blondelle, photographed by Terry Richardson.

On the runway, Lowe was selected by Karl Lagerfeld to model for Chanel, and has appeared on catwalks in New York, Milan and London for Topshop and designers such as PPQ, Nanette Lepore, Sue Stemp, Charlotte Ronson, Henry Holland, and Vivienne Westwood. She has modelled for Agent Provocateur lingere for the past three years, and has been used by Burberry, Converse shoes, Dr. Martens, Hooch, Wheels and Doll Baby, Ben Sherman, Frost French, Hari, Karen Millen, Diesel SpA and Whistles, as well as for her mother's recent collection of lace dresses.

Of the Whistles campaign, Lowe said, "[It] was a favourite shoot of mine. ... Modelling is a cool outlet for me to express myself, and fashion has always fascinated me. I love that fashion crosses into my other passions – music and art."

Lowe's magazine work includes editorials and covers of publications such as Tatler, Elle, GQ, Vogue, Paradis, Marie Claire, Interview, Jalouse, Teen Vogue, Dirty Glam, Grazia, InStyle, Nylon, and The Sunday Times Style amongst many others.

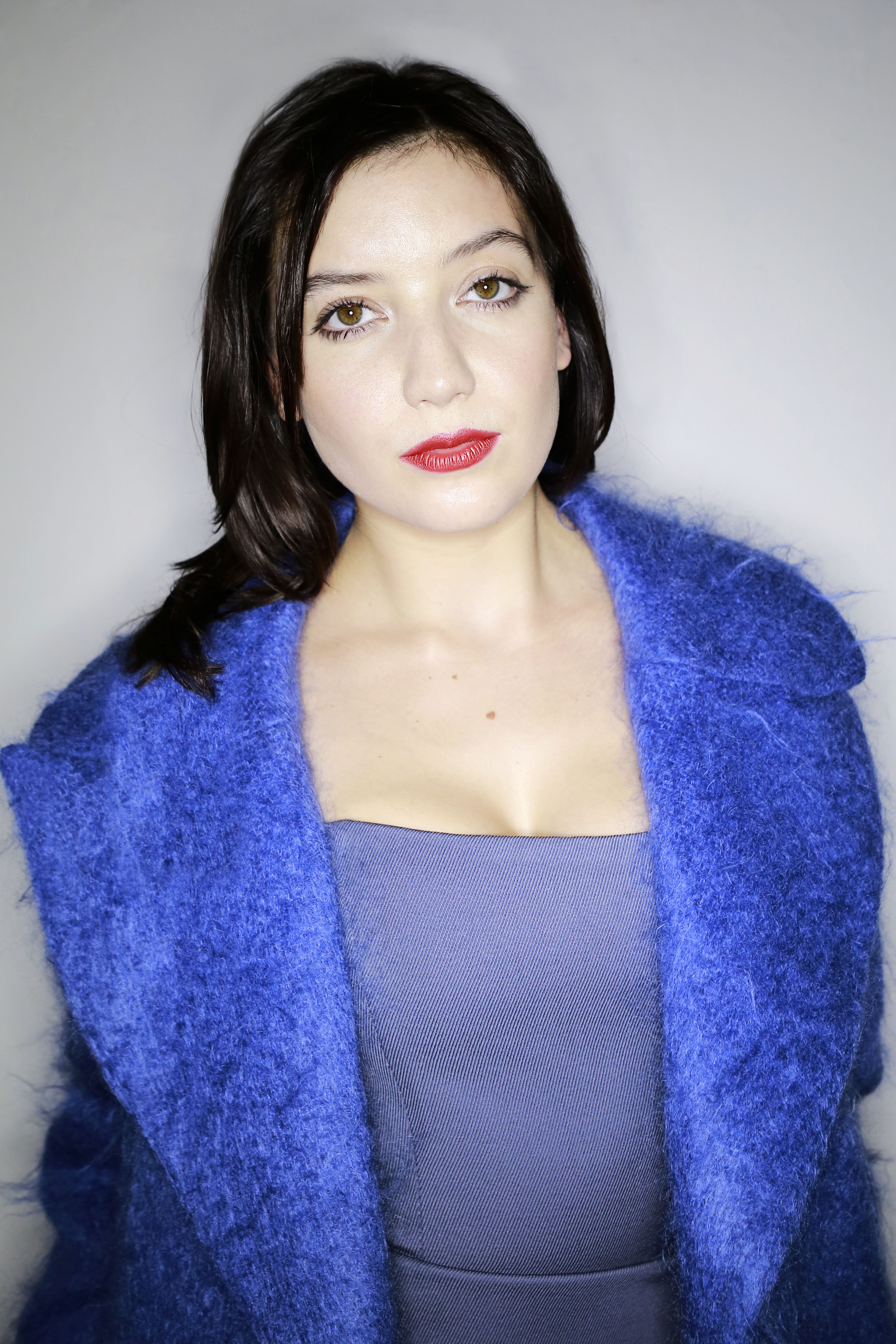
Lowe in 2014

She has recently appeared in campaigns for Marc by Marc Jacobs, Pringle of Scotland, DKNY, Louis Vuitton, Mango, and Esprit.

Lowe has some experience in other media, including being the focus of the BBC Two eight-part fly on the wall documentary series Class of 2008, co-hosting Glamour's Best Dressed 2008 with Peaches Geldof for Fiver, and a brief contribution to a blog for Elle UK online. Lowe has worked as a DJ, appeared in the music videos "NYC Beat" by Armand Van Helden and "Bloodthirsty Bastards" by Dirty Pretty Things, and hosted events for Tommy Hilfiger and Dolce and Gabbana.

2009 also saw Lowe feature in The First Days of Spring, Noah and the Whale's film accompaniment to their second album.

She was chosen to be in the 2010 Pirelli Calendar photographed by Terry Richardson in Bahia, Brazil. Throughout May 2010 Lowe documented her daily fashion and style choices for Vogue.co.uk's "Today I'm Wearing" feature. In August 2010, Lowe became the face of the newly relaunched sixties label Biba. She is also the face of Stephen Webster's 2011 jewellery campaign.

In 2011, Lowe went topless for Esquire and nude for Playboy. Also in 2011, she was featured in the music video for Miles Kane's "Come Closer".

In October 2014, Lowe appeared in a comedy sketch with Jimmy Carr for Channel 4's The Feeling Nuts Comedy Night raising awareness of testicular cancer. In the sketch Carr lures Lowe to a hotel suite to check his testicles. The sketch also features Jamie Cullum, Lance Armstrong and Rylan Clarke. She was number 89 on FHM 100 Sexiest of 2015. She also had a small part in the action film Pressure.

On 17 August 2016, Lowe was announced as a contestant for series 14 of Strictly Come Dancing. She was partnered up with Aljaž Škorjanec and left in week eight.

Lowe started a podcast, Femme: It's All About Being A Woman and in 2019 worked with artist Jemima Sara on a related clothing line.

== Personal life ==
In 2013, Lowe learned Transcendental Meditation and said London Fashion Week that year "was so much less stressful, so much more fun. I wasn't taking it all on so much."

Lowe spoke on The Truth Flirts in 2019, discussing politics within dating, where she discussed how at 21 she had undergone an abortion as she did not feel ready to be a parent. She also discussed being shamed about her body by an ex.

From 2010 to 2014, Lowe was in a relationship with actor Matt Smith.

In October 2022, Lowe announced that she was expecting her first child with fiancé Jordan Saul, a real estate developer. Lowe gave birth to a daughter in April 2023.

In June 2025, Saul and Lowe married.

== Selected works ==
- Lowe, Daisy (2014). Sweetness and light: 60 recipes for healthy sweet treats. London. ISBN 9781849495370.
