= Something's Gotta Give =

Something's Gotta Give or Something's Got to Give may refer to:

== Film ==
- Something's Got to Give, a 1962 film starring Marilyn Monroe and Dean Martin
- Something's Gotta Give (film), a 2003 film starring Jack Nicholson and Diane Keaton

== Music ==
=== Albums ===
- Something's Gotta Give (album), by Agnostic Front, 1998
- Something Gotta Give, a mixtape by Big Lean, 2011

=== Songs ===
- "Something's Gotta Give" (The John Butler Trio song), 2004
- "Something's Gotta Give" (Johnny Mercer song), first performed by Fred Astaire in the film Daddy Long Legs, 1955; covered by many
- "Something's Gotta Give" (LeAnn Rimes song), 2005
- "Something's Gotta Give", by Aerosmith from Nine Lives, 1997
- "Something's Gotta Give", by All Time Low from Future Hearts, 2015
- "Something's Got to Give", by the Beastie Boys from Check Your Head, 1992
- "Somethin's Gotta Give", by Billy Sheehan from Compression, 2001
- "Something's Gotta Give", by Camila Cabello from Camila, 2018
- "Something's Gotta Give", by Pere Ubu from The Tenement Year, 1988
- "Something's Gotta Give", by Lucinda Williams from World's Gone Wrong, 2026

== Other ==
- "Something's Gotta Give" (Grey's Anatomy), a television episode
- "Something's Got to Give", a New York Times Magazine article by Darcy Frey, basis for the film Pushing Tin
