= Happenstance =

Happenstance, a portmanteau of happening and circumstance, may refer to:

== Film and TV ==
- Happenstance (film), a 2000 French film by Laurent Firode
- "Happenstance" (CSI), a season seven episode of the American crime drama CSI

== Music ==
- Happenstance (Fozzy album), a 2002 album
- Happenstance (Rachael Yamagata album), a 2004 album
- "Happenstance", a song by The dB's from their 1982 album Repercussion
- "Happenstance", a song by Miles Kane from the album Colour of the Trap

== Other ==
- Happenstance, a novel by Canadian author Carol Shields
