= People watching (disambiguation) =

People-watching is the act of observing people and their interactions in public.

People watching can also refer to:

- "People Watching" (Conan Gray song), 2021
- People Watching (album), 2025 album by Sam Fender
  - "People Watching" (Sam Fender song), 2024
- People Watching, 2024 album by 156/Silence
- "People Watching", 2020 song by CeeLo Green from the album CeeLo Green Is Thomas Callaway
- "People Watching", 2006 song by Jack Johnson from the soundtrack album Sing-A-Longs and Lullabies for the Film Curious George
- "People Watching", 2008 song by The Rascals from the album Rascalize
- PeopleWatching, Canadian animated web series
