= Simone Sello =

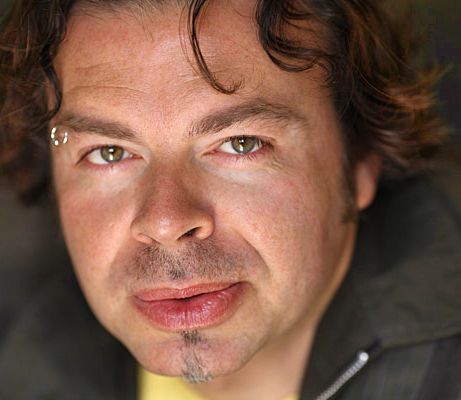
- Simone Sello

Background information
- Born: July 4, 1968 (age 57); Rome, Italy
- Genres: Pop, rock, experimental rock, R&B
- Occupations: Guitarist, producer, songwriter, music journalist, arranger, composer, film composer
- Instruments: Electric guitar, electric bass, keyboards, vocals, violin, computer programming
- Years active: 1987–present
- Labels: Disney, EMI, Favored Nations, Island Def Jam, dPulse
- Website: youtube.com/simonesello1968

Simone Sello (born July 4, 1968) is an Italian born guitarist, music producer, composer, filmmaker and music journalist. He is known for his work with the Sanremo Festival Orchestra, Chicanery, Billy Sheehan, Aaron Carter, Disney, Hannah Montana, Vasco Rossi and Warren Cuccurullo, both as a producer and guitarist; and as a journalist for the magazines Chitarre, Strumenti Musicali, Accordo and Ganzo.

His musical upbringing is based on classical violin studies, as well as watching and hearing his father play guitar, but he never took a formal guitar lesson, in spite of his career as a guitar player. His influences include major classical and jazz composers and performers, (Bach, Ravel, Miles Davis, Weather Report), pop and rock acts (The Beatles, David Bowie, Pink Floyd, Metallica, Lucio Battisti), and experimental artists (Luciano Berio, Brian Eno, Terje Rypdal, Klaus Schulze).

Equally interested in performing, composing and producing music, Simone started getting hired to play guitar for recording sessions and live performances by artists in his hometown Rome when he was 17 years old, and eventually became known on a national level. While building a long list of musical collaborations, he started writing articles for magazines, thus achieving a different kind of exposure, still in the music field.

At the age of 29, he moved to Los Angeles to push his musician and journalist careers, by joining a big international scene.

== Early professional career ==
After studying the violin, he started his professional career as a guitarist in Rome, recording a guitar solo on the song "Incinerator", soundtrack of the homonymous movie, produced in 1982 and never shown until 2020, then recording the song The Fighter with his band Waterfall, for the compilation Metal Attack (RCA 1987). Then, he got hired to play with Italian pop singers Renato Zero, Tullio De Piscopo, Nino Buonocore and Michele Zarrillo, and in several national TV shows. From 1994 to 1997 he joined the orchestra of the Sanremo Festival, where he had a chance to play with several international musicians, such as Ray Charles, George Benson, Pat Metheny, Michael Bolton, Celine Dion, Kenny G, Nek, and Laura Pausini. During that time, he also arranged the song Non Ci Sto which brought the singer Syria to win the Sanremo singing contest in the "new artists" category, in 1996.

== Music journalism ==
Meanwhile, he started writing articles on the music magazine Chitarre, based on analysis of rock, pop and jazz musicians. Then occasionally on Strumenti Musicali and – later – on the web magazines Accordo and Ganzo. In Chitarre and Accordo, Simone Sello's articles have included interviews with some notable musicians, among which Steve Vai, Lee Ritenour, and Vasco Rossi.

Encouraged by the appeal his early articles had to young musicians, he published two instructional books and DVDs: Tecniche e segreti della chitarra elettrica dalla A alla Z (1996) and La chitarra rock – il fraseggio e l`improvvisazione (1997).

== Move to Los Angeles ==
In 1997 he moved to Los Angeles, California, where he kept pursuing his musician and journalist careers. Through a referral by guitar legend Steve Vai, Simone met the bass player Billy Sheehan, with whom he started a long collaboration. After programming and playing in Billy's first two solo records (Compression in 2001 – which features Steve Vai and drummer Terry Bozzio – and Cosmic Troubadour in 2005) he produced his third record, entitled Holy Cow (2009), which also includes guest appearances by Billy Gibbons, Paul Gilbert and Doug Pinnick. Meanwhile, he had joined pop star Aaron Carter's live band, with whom he appeared in several US TV shows, including The Tonight Show with Jay Leno and Donnie & Marie; he also appears in the live DVD Aaron's Party (2002) along with Aaron's brother Nick Carter, from Backstreet Boys. In 2014, he plays guitars in Cristina Scuccia's debut album (also known as Suor Cristina or Sister Christina), along with other LA musicians, such as Vinnie Colaiuta and Tim Pierce.

=== Disney ===
Through fellow producer Marco Marinangeli, he started a series of collaborations with Disney, including La Vida Mickey (2000), Disney Pop Dreamers (2002), Superstar Kidz Vol. 1 and 2 (2003–2004), Hannah Montana's Hits Remixed (2008), a series of Disney Mobile commercials for Japan featuring Hilary Duff, and a remix of the song Now Or Never from High School Musical 3. In 2011 Simone wrote and produced Coming To Life the debut CD of young American pop singer Amber Lily, whose song I'm Into It, got used in the movie Christmas Cupid (2010), and participated in Disney's Next Big Thing contest in 2010 with the songs "2 2 2 L 8 (too too too late)" and Next To You.

=== Warren Cuccurullo and Chicanery ===
After meeting guitarist Warren Cuccurullo (formerly with Frank Zappa, Missing Persons and Duran Duran), he produced the debut CD of surreal alternative rock band Chicanery (dPulse 2010) at RedRum Studios. In the album Simone Sello also plays bass, guitar, violin and synths; other remarkable musicians include vocalist Neil Carlill and guest drummer Terry Bozzio. He also co-produced Warren's album Playing in Tongues (2009 Edel Records Europe – Zappa Records USA), and a concept album entitled N'Liten Up.

=== Vasco Rossi ===
In 2008 he started working with Italian rockstar Vasco Rossi, appearing in the videoclip for Il Mondo Che Vorrei (2008) and on the short documentary Quello che non si potrebbe (2008). He is listed as backing vocalist in the song Gioca Con Me, along with rock guitarist Slash. Then he collaborated to the CDTracks II – Inediti e rarità (2009), programming the hit song Sto Pensando A Te and playing lead guitar on Ho Fatto Un Sogno; in 2011, Vasco Rossi released a new studio album Vivere O Niente, which features Simone Sello on guitar, keyboards and programing on several tracks, and includes a song he co-wrote with Vasco and Saverio Principini, called Manifesto Futurista Della Nuova Umanità. In 2013 Vasco Rossi released two more singles: in the first one, called L'uomo più semplice Simone Sello is credited as guitarist, keyboardist and programmer, and in the second, called Cambia-menti he is credited as guitarist and co-writer. In Vasco's 2014 album Sono innocente, he appears again as a co-writer, in Lo Vedi, and as a guitar player, in L'Ape Regina and Marta Piange Ancora. On January 1, 2021, Vasco Rossi released the single Una Canzone D’Amore Buttata Via, which features a guitar solo by Simone Sello. Later in November 2021, the song appears again on Vasco's album Siamo Qui where Simone co-wrote Prendiamo il Volo and Patto con Riscatto. On March 8 2024, in occasion of international women day, Vasco Rossi presented and released the song Libera e se mi va written by him for the singer Denise Faro who recorded the final version, co-produced by Simone Sello.

== Scoring ==
In 2004 Simone wrote part of the soundtrack of the movie The Youngest Guns, and in 2005 he scored a short movie called 4 and 1/4 with Alex Alessandroni Jr. With Saverio Principini, he co-scored the documentary Una su Tre (2011), and in 2012 he contributed to the soundtrack of the documentary Iceberg Slim: Portrait of a Pimp, directed by Jorge Hinojosa and produced by Ice-T.

== Songwriting and production ==
As SimoneX, he had the song Lines of Change licensed in the movie Two Lovers (2008) and with Mafia Bianca Llc he had the song I Am Changing, co-written with Steven E. Heinstein, used in the movie When in Rome (2010 Touchstone Pictures) and its CD soundtrack. Another one of their songs I Know I am Broken made it into the episode Where`s Kaylie in the TV series Make It or Break It (2009).

== Solo projects - images for music ==
In 2018 Sello made the experimental movie Organum Mathematicum, consisting of original videos and images assembled over a continuum of 6 electronic musical pieces. The project won an award at the 9th monthly season of the Cult Critic Movie Awards and achieved an honorable mention award at the May 2018 edition of the Festigious Film Festival. In 2023 he released The Storyteller's Project, an EP made of 5 compositions synchronized to videos, and played it live in Japan, Los Angeles and Italy. The most recent live performances also include material from the upcoming Paparazzi, Izakayas and Cowboys, a project loosely inspired by the Spaghetti Western genre, along with experimental rock, electronica, Japanese and blues elements.

== Selected discography ==
=== Compilation ===
Album

Year	Artist	Album	Label	Involvement
1987	Waterfall	Metal Attack	RCA	Album includes The Fighter by Waterfall.

=== Solo ===
Album

Year	Artist	Album	Label	Involvement
2023	Simone Sello	The Storyteller's Project	Usagi Ya	main artist, producer, guitars, programming

=== As producer, composer, writer, programmer, sound engineer, arranger, performer on other artists' albums ===
Year	Artist	Album	Label	Involvement
1990	Kaoma Do Brasil	Lambada		guitar
1993	Lorella Cuccarini	Voci		guitar
1994	Michele Zarrillo	Come Uomo Fra Gli Uomini	Sony BMG	guitar
1995	Lorella Cuccarini	Voglia di Fare	RTI Music	guitar
1995	Enrico Sognato	Scambierei Le Figurine Con Chiunque		guitar
1995	Rottura	Esorcismo Contro Satana E Gli Angeli Ribelli (12")		guitar
1996	Michele Zarrillo	L'Elefante E La Farfalla	Sony BMG	guitar
1996	Syria	Non Ci Sto	Musicrama/Koch	arranger, guitar
1996	Neri Per Caso	Strumenti	Tristar	guitar
1997	Syria	L'Angelo	Musicrama/Koch	guitar
1998	Myriam Hernandez	Todo El Amor	Sony	guitar
1998	Albano Carrisi	Il Nuovo Concerto		guitar
1998	Davide Pettirossi	Grandi Spazi		guitar
1998	Cartoon Boyfriend	Baby 2000		guitar, programming
1998	Handel	Blood mix EP		producer
1998	Marina Rei	Anime Belle		guitar
1999	Marina Rei	Un Inverno Da Baciare		guitar
1999	Various Artists	Baila Habibi Vol. 1	Sony	programming
2000	Neri Per Caso	Angelo Blu	EMI	guitar
2000	Cartoon Boyfriend	Nipples	Drool Records	guitar, programming
2000	Various Artists	La Vida Mickey	Disney	guitar
2000	Ru Paul	Queer Duck dance remix	ICEBOX	producer
2001	Various Artists	Mickey's Dance Party	Disney	guitar
2001	Billy Sheehan	Compression	Favored Nations	keyboards, programming
2001	Billy Sheehan	Caroline	Zain Japan	keyboards, programming
2002	Various Artists	Pop Dreamers	Disney	guitar
2002	Aaron Carter	Aaron's Party live DVD	Jive	guitar
2003	Various Artists	Superstar Kidz Vol. 1	Disney	guitar
2004	Various Artists	Superstar Kidz Vol. 2	Disney	guitar
2004	Billy Sheehan	Cosmic Troubadour	Favored Nations	guitar, keyboards, programming
2005	Robbie Wyckoff	Lose Control	Compression	guitar
2006	Snatam Kaur	Anand	Spirit Voyage	guitar
2006	Tre Lux	A Strange Gathering	Cleopatra	guitar
2006	Hannah Montana	Hannah Montana 1 - Songs from the Hit TV series	Disney	guitar
2007	Sat Hari Singh	Singh		guitar
2007	Various Artists	Swashbuckling Sea Songs	Disney	guitar
2007	Devil's Slingshot	Clinophobia	Mri Associated	engineer
2007	Sat Kartar	Listen	Spirit Voyage	guitar
2007	Various Artists	Cantemos El ABC	Fisher-Price	guitar, keyboards, programming, producer
2007	Kaiulani Kimbrell	Break Open	CDBY	guitar
2007	Sat Hari Singh	Servant Of The Earth		guitar
2007	Hannah Montana	Hannah Montana 2 – Meet Miley Cyrus	Disney	guitar
2008	Amana Melomè	Indigo Red	Savana	guitar
2008	Vasco Rossi	Il Mondo Che Vorrei		guitar
2008	Various Artists	ABC Daytime Love Affair	Buena Vista	guitar
2008	Snatam Kaur	Joy Is Now	Spirit Voyage	guitar
2008	Hannah Montana	Hits Remixed	Disney, EMI	producer
2009	Warren Cuccurullo	Playing In Tongues	Edel, Zappa	guitar, keyboards, programming, producer
2009	Snatam Kaur	Liberation`s Door	Spirit Voyage	guitar
2009	Vasco Rossi	Tracks Inediti e Rarità	EMI	guitar
2009	Billy Sheehan	Holy Cow	Mascot Records	guitar, keyboards, programming, producer
2010	Tiromancino	L`Essenziale		guitar
2010	Snatam Kaur	Sacred Chants	Sounds True	guitar
2010	Chicanery	Chicanery	dPulse	guitar, keyboards, violin, programming, producer
2010	Mafia Bianca Llc	I Am Changing	Chime Entertainment	guitar, keyboards, programming, engineer, producer
2011	Vasco Rossi	Vivere O Niente	EMI	guitar, keyboards, programming, composer
2011	Amber Lily	Coming to Life	Island Def Jam	guitar, keyboards, programming, engineer, producer
2012	Various Artists	Disney Jingle Bell Fun	Walt Disney Records	guitar, bass, arranger
2013	Vasco Rossi	L`Uomo Più Semplice	EMI	guitar, keyboards
2013	Vasco Rossi	Cambia-menti	Universal	guitar, composer
2014	Vasco Rossi	Sono Innocente	Universal	guitar, keyboards, composer
2014	Maya Angelou	Caged Bird Songs	Smooch Records	guitar, bass
2014	Sister Cristina	Sister Cristina	Universal	guitar
2016	Vasco Rossi	Vascononstop	Universal	guitar, keyboards, programming, composer
2016	Vasco Rossi	Tutto in una Notte: Live Kom 2015	Universal	composer
2017	Sons of Apollo	Psychotic Symphony		sound engineer
2018	Various Artists	Guitare...Mon Amour	Terre Sommerse	guitar
2018	Ron Carter, Airto Moreira & Peter Erskine	Sides of: Jazz	Hugeous Mass Media	guitar, composer
2021	Vasco Rossi	Una Canzone D’Amore Buttata Via	Universal	lead guitar

== Filmography ==
=== Film ===
- The Youngest Guns (2004), theme music performed by Simone Sello – composer
- 4 1/4 (2005 Posh Films), soundtrack score performed by Simone Sello and Alex Alessandroni, jr. – composer
- Vasco - Quello che non si potrebbe (2008 Wonderland Entertainment) - cast member
- Two Lovers (2008 Magnolia Pictures) Lines of Change, performed by SimoneX – writer
- When in Rome (2010 Touchstone Pictures) I am Changing performed by Mafia Bianca, LLC – co-writer
- Una su Tre (2011 Cinerentola), soundtrack score performed by Simone Sello – composer
- Iceberg Slim: Portrait of a Pimp (2012 Ice-T), soundtrack score performed by Simone Sello – composer
- Organum Mathematicum (2018), directed by Simone Sello – director and music composer

=== Television ===
- Sanremo Music Festival Rai 1 1994–1997 performer/arranger
- Make It or Break It ABC Family TV series 2009 Season 1, Episode 9 Where's Kaylie? I Know I'm Broken producer/writer
- Christmas Cupid TV movie 2010 I'm Into It writer
