= Change the Show =

Studio album by Miles Kane
- Released: 21 January 2022
- Genre: Northern soul; indie rock
- Length: 36:52
- Label: BMG
- Producer: Oscar Robertson; David Bardon

Miles Kane chronology
Coup de Grace (2018)	Change the Show (2022)	One Man Band (2023)

Singles from Change the Show
- 1. "Don't Let It Get You Down" Released: 24 August 2021; 2. "Caroline" Released: 24 September 2021; 3. "See Ya When I See Ya" Released: 22 October 2021; 4. "Nothing's Ever Gonna Be Good Enough" Released: 24 November 2021

Change the Show is the fourth studio album by English musician Miles Kane, released on 21 January 2022 through BMG Rights Management.

== Background and recording ==
Kane had initially finished recording the album in early 2021, but decided to re-record it after an "impromptu collaboration" with Oscar Robertson and Dave Bardon of Sunglasses for Jaws, which made it "a lot less structured". The resulting album takes inspiration from the "'60s and '70s sounds of Motown and Northern Soul".

== Critical reception ==
Professional ratings
Aggregate scores
Source	Rating
Metacritic	71/100
Review scores
Source	Rating
AllMusic	4/5 stars
American Songwriter	3.5/5 stars
Clash	8/10
DIY	3/5 stars
Gigwise	8/10 stars
NME	3/5 stars

Emma Harrison of Clash rated the album 8 out of 10 and called it Kane's "most well-rounded album to date", "a deft fusion of genres" and "a deep dive into his musings on life, love and everything in-between". Elisa Cloughton of Gigwise gave Change the Show 8 out of 10 stars, finding it to be a "showcase of what Kane is capable of creating"—a fusion of "Motown and Northern Soul with his usual indie rock sound, which wouldn't necessarily be thought of as a compatible grouping but, boy, does it work".

Matt Collar of AllMusic described Change the Show as "a fizzy mix of vintage-inspired anthems" that "are über-catchy and it's a testament to Kane's decade-mashing skills that, while certainly throwback in aesthetic, the songs never feel dated or overly nostalgic" because of his "good-humored punk swagger and wry sense of humor". Writing for American Songwriter, Lee Zimmerman deemed Kane a "true pop savant, an artist whose dedication to form is echoed in every note of his impressive new album", calling the "energy and exuberance" he found after working with Sunglasses for Jaws "palpable with each of these offerings. That vigor and vitality surge with these songs, giving Kane a powerful presence".

Reviewing the album for NME, Sophie Williams summarised the album as containing "ruminative, lightly experimental songs that seem to be searching for answers", and giving the album three stars out of five, called it a "solid but unchallenging album [that takes] a step towards nowhere in particular". Elvis Thirlwell of DIY also awarded it three out of five stars, pointing out that the "blanketing lime-lit production" and "in-your-face '60s nostalgia [...] may be too cloying for some".

== Track listing ==
Change the Show track listing
No.	Title	Writer(s)	Length
1.	"Tears Are Falling"	Miles Kane; Jamie Biles	3:01
2.	"Don't Let It Get You Down"	Kane; Biles	3:59
3.	"Nothing's Ever Gonna Be Good Enough" (featuring Corinne Bailey-Rae)	Kane; Biles	2:32
4.	"See Ya When I See Ya"	Kane; Biles	3:01
5.	"Never Get Tired of Dancing"	Kane; Biles; Simon Aldred	3:38
6.	"Tell Me What You're Feeling"	Kane; Willie J Healey	3:16
7.	"Coming of Age"	Kane; Biles	3:46
8.	"Change the Show"	Kane; Biles	2:29
9.	"Constantly"	Kane; Biles	3:46
10.	"Caroline"	Kane; Biles	3:28
11.	"Adios Ta-ra Ta-ra"	Kane; Healey	3:56
Total length:			36:52

== Personnel ==
- Miles Kane – lead vocals, backing vocals, guitar
- David Bardon – production, engineering (all tracks); bass (tracks 1–7, 9); drums, keyboards, percussion (9)
- Oscar Robertson – production (all tracks); drums, percussion (tracks 1–7, 9–11)
- Matt Colton – mastering
- Loren Humphrey – mixing (all tracks); drums, percussion (track 8)
- João Mello – backing vocals, keyboards (tracks 1–7, 9–11); horn (1–6, 10, 11)
- Holly Quin-Ankrah – backing vocals (tracks 2–6, 10, 11)
- Corinne Bailey Rae – lead vocals (track 3)
- Jamie Biles – bass, synthesizer (track 8)
- Bobbie Gordon – backing vocals (track 8)
- Jodie Scantlebury – backing vocals (track 8)
- Aidan Cochrane – artwork
- Lauren Luxenberg – photography

== Charts ==
Chart performance for Change the Show
Chart (2022)	Peak position
Belgian Albums (Ultratop Flanders)	132
Belgian Albums (Ultratop Wallonia)	69
French Albums (SNEP)	141
Scottish Albums (OCC)	4
UK Albums (OCC)	12
