= Give Up (EP) =

EP by Miles Kane
- Released: 22 February 2013
- Recorded: 2012–2013
- Genre: Indie rock
- Length: 9:58
- Label: Sony Music Entertainment
- Producer: Ian Broudie

Miles Kane chronology
First of My Kind (2011)	Give Up (2013)	Don't Forget Who You Are (2013)

Give Up is an EP by the English indie rock musician Miles Kane. It was released on 21 February 2013.

== Track listing ==
No.	Title	Writer(s)	Length
1.	"Give Up"	Miles Kane, Kid Harpoon	2:46
2.	"Woman's Touch"	Miles Kane, Guy Chambers	3:56
3.	"The Competition"	Miles Kane, Eugene McGuinness	3:16

== Chart performance ==
Chart (2012)	Peak position
Belgium (Ultratip Bubbling Under Flanders)	30
UK Singles (The Official Charts Company)	65

== Release history ==
Region	Date	Format	Label
United Kingdom	22 February 2013	Digital download	Columbia
