= Don't Forget Who You Are (song) =

Single by Miles Kane

from the album Don't Forget Who You Are
- B-side: "Get Right"
- Released: 3 June 2013
- Recorded: 2013
- Genre: Indie rock, alternative rock
- Length: 3:25
- Label: Sony Music Entertainment UK Limited
- Songwriter(s): Ian Broudie, Miles Kane

Miles Kane singles chronology
"Give Up" (2013)	"Don't Forget Who You Are" (2013)	"Are You Getting Enough?" (2013)

"Don't Forget Who You Are" is a song by the English musician Miles Kane from his second studio album Don't Forget Who You Are. It was released on 3 June 2013 as a Digital download in the United Kingdom. Its B-side, "Get Right", was co-written by Arctic Monkeys frontman Alex Turner, who played bass guitar on the song. The song is featured on the EA Sports video game, FIFA 14.

== Track listing ==
Digital download - Single
No.	Title	Length
1.	"Don't Forget Who You Are"	3:25

7" Vinyl - Single
No.	Title	Length
1.	"Don't Forget Who You Are"	3:25
2.	"Get Right"	2:12

== Personnel ==
- Miles Kane - lead vocals, guitar
- Ian Broudie - keyboards, backing vocals
- Martyn Campbell - bass guitar
- Sean Payne - drums
- Chris Balin, Juliet Roberts, Sylvia Mason-James - backing vocals
- George Moran - backing vocals on "Get Right"
- Ben Parsons - keyboards on "Get Right"
- Alex Turner - bass guitar on "Get Right"
- Pete Thomas - drums, percussion on "Get Right"
