= The Rascals (English band) =

English rock band

- The Rascals performing at the Cardiff International Arena in June 2007.

Background information
- Origin: Hoylake, Merseyside, England
- Years active: 2007–2009
- Label: Deltasonic
- Past members: Miles Kane; Joe Edwards; Greg Mighall

The Rascals were an English rock band from the Hoylake, in 2007. Their debut album, Rascalize, was released on 23 June 2008. In August 2009, it was announced that the lead singer, Miles Kane, left the Rascals to focus on a solo career and the group disbanded. Kane later formed the band, the Last Shadow Puppets, with Alex Turner of the Arctic Monkeys.

== History ==
Hailing from Hoylake (The Wirral, on Merseyside) in England, The Rascals began as a three person band in September 2007. They were signed to Deltasonic Records and played their first gig as support for more well-known bands, including Arctic Monkeys.

In December 2007, the band released their debut EP, Out of Dreams, which contains their first single of the same name. A second single was released on 18 February 2008 called Suspicious Wit.

The Rascals' debut album, Rascalize, was released on 23 June 2008 (first released on iTunes on 15 June 2008). The album's reception was not successful commercially, only peaking at #100 on the UK Albums Chart for one week; however, its release was generally well received by critics.

The Rascals perform in the film Awaydays, an adaptation of the book by Kevin Sampson. In the film, they are seen playing a cover version of the song All That Jazz by Echo & the Bunnymen. The track is available on the Soundtrack, released on 18 May 2008.

On 24 August 2009, lead singer Miles Kane confirmed to NME that he had quit The Rascals. Kane stated that he was writing new material and had been in the studio. Greg Mighall and Joe Edwards announced they were working on a film project with 'Awaydays' star Liam Boyle.

== Membership ==
The group consisted of:

- Miles Kane – Lead vocals and guitar
- Joe Edwards – Bass
- Greg Mighall – Drums

== Discography ==
=== Album ===
Title	Album details	Peak chart positions
Title	Album details	UK
Rascalize	Released: 15 June 2008; Label: Deltasonic	100

=== EPs ===
Title	Album details
Out of Dreams	Released: 9 December 2007; Label: Deltasonic; Limited edition EP, not eligible for charts
Suspicious Wit	Released: 2008; Label: Deltasonic; Format: CD, 10" vinyl

=== Singles ===
Title	Year	Album
"Out of Dreams"	2007	Out of Dreams EP
"Suspicious Wit"	2008	Suspicious Wit EP
"Freakbeat Phantom"	2008	Rascalize
"I'll Give You Sympathy"	2008	Rascalize

=== Music videos ===
- Out of Dreams
- Suspicious Wit
- Freakbeat Phantom
- I'll Give You Sympathy
- I'll Give You Sympathy (Night Time Version)
