= Coup de Grace (Miles Kane album) =

Studio album by Miles Kane
- Released: 10 August 2018
- Genre: Indie rock, alternative rock, glam rock
- Length: 31:48
- Label: Virgin EMI
- Producer: John Congleton

Miles Kane chronology
Don't Forget Who You Are (2013)	Coup de Grace (2018)	Change the Show (2022)

Singles from Coup de Grace
- 1. "Loaded" Released: 16 April 2018; 2. "Cry On My Guitar" Released: 27 June 2018; 3. "Killing The Joke" Released: 2 October 2018

Coup de Grace is the third studio album by English musician Miles Kane. It was released on 10 August 2018.

== Background ==
Miles Kane started writing the album right after his second solo album Don't Forget Who You Are was released, but became sidetracked when he and Alex Turner resumed their writing partnership for The Last Shadow Puppets's album Everything You've Come to Expect. The songs "Silverscreen", "Coup de Grace" and "Shavambacu" were written in New York. However, according to Kane, he got stuck in a rut while in Los Angeles and "couldn't finish anything" following a break-up. In 2017, he went to an acoustic gig by Jamie T, whom he knew for many years. Afterwards he stayed with Jamie T in a hotel and the two started to write songs together, including "Nothing Changes". The first single from the album, "Loaded", is also written with Jamie T, but became a collaboration with Lana Del Rey when she joined in while it was being written.

Kane recorded the album in Los Angeles with producer John Congleton. The album was recorded in two weeks.

According to Kane, the title Coup de Grace is a reference to the closing move of his favourite WWE wrestler Finn Bálor. Bálor also appears in the music video for "Cry On My Guitar".

== Critical reception ==
Professional ratings
Aggregate scores
Source	Rating
AnyDecentMusic?	5.1/10
Metacritic	57/100
Review scores
Source	Rating
AllMusic	4/5 stars
DIY	3/5 stars
The Guardian	3/5 stars
musicOMH	3/5 stars
NME	3/5 stars
Pitchfork	3.6/10

Coup de Grace received mixed reviews from critics upon release. On Metacritic, the album holds a score of 57/100 based on 11 reviews, indicating "mixed or average reviews".

== Track listing ==
No.	Title	Writer(s)	Length
1.	"Too Little, Too Late"	Miles Kane; Jamie Treays	2:36
2.	"Cry on My Guitar"	Kane; Treays	3:42
3.	"Loaded"	Kane; Treays; Elizabeth Grant	3:18
4.	"Cold Light of Day"	Kane; Treays	2:10
5.	"Killing the Joke"	Kane; Treays	3:17
6.	"Coup de Grace"	Kane; Zachary Dawes; Loren Humphrey; Tyler Parkford	3:55
7.	"Silverscreen"	Kane; Dawes; Humphrey; Parkford	2:19
8.	"Wrong Side of Life"	Kane; Treays	3:42
9.	"Something to Rely On"	Kane; Treays	3:20
10.	"Shavambacu"	Kane; Dawes; Humphrey; Parkford	3:34
Total length:			31:48

== Personnel ==
Credits adapted from album liner notes.

- Miles Kane – vocals, guitar (all), bass (5, 8)
- Tyler Parkford – keyboards (except 5, 8)
- Zach Dawes – bass (except 5, 8)
- Loren Humphrey – drums (except 5, 8)
- Jamie T – guitar, bass, drum programming (5, 8)

== Charts ==
Chart (2018)	Peak position
Belgian Albums (Ultratop Flanders)	20
Belgian Albums (Ultratop Wallonia)	34
Dutch Albums (Album Top 100)	157
Irish Albums (IRMA)	97
Scottish Albums (OCC)	5
Swiss Albums (Schweizer Hitparade)	70
UK Albums (OCC)	8
