= Sunlight in the Shadows =

Studio album by Miles Kane
- Released: 17 October 2025
- Recorded: January 2025
- Studio: Easy Eye Sound Studios (Nashville, Tennessee)
- Genre: Indie rock
- Length: 37:55
- Label: Easy Eye Sound
- Producer: Dan Auerbach

Miles Kane chronology
One Man Band (2023)	Sunlight in the Shadows (2025)

Singles from Sunlight in the Shadows
- 1. "Love is Cruel" Released: 19 June 2025; 2. "Electric Flower" Released: 31 July 2025; 3. "I Pray" Released: 2 September 2025; 4. "Without You" Released: 25 September 2025

Sunlight in the Shadows is the sixth studio album by English rock musician Miles Kane, released on 17 October 2025 by Easy Eye Sound.

It was written by Kane in late 2024, alongside The Black Keys front man Dan Auerbach, Pat McLaughlin and Patrick Carney. It was produced in Nashville by Auerbach. The album artwork depicts Kane riding a motorcycle, looking in his rear view mirror as the sun sets.

== Background and recording ==
Kane first met Auerbach during the summer of 2024, though Kane had been a self-described "fanboy" of Auerbach's prior work. Kane and Auerbach quickly bonded over their shared musical influences, such as T. Rex, The Easybeats, and Motown.

Kane had originally planned to work again with his cousin James Skelly (who had produced his previous album One Man Band) before accepting Auerbach's offer to collaborate on Kane's forthcoming album. Recording took place in January 2025 and only took five days to complete.

== Critical reception ==
Professional ratings
Review scores
Source	Rating
AllMusic	4/5 stars
Clash	8/10
Hive Magazine	4/5 stars
Hot Press	8/10
Music Connection	8/10
Spectrum Culture	75/100

The album received generally favorable reviews from critics. Matt Collar of AllMusic wrote that the work "believably captures the fizzy, whiskey & Coke flavors and tube-amp sonic textures of a classic '70s T. Rex album without ever falling too far into theatrical pastiche." Jake Mcfarlane of Hive Magazine praised Kane's songwriting, commenting: "hearing Miles Kane be so raw, open, vulnerable and honest about his upbringing and the pressures he’s always placed on himself is something I’m sure we can all see ourselves in."

== Track listing ==
All tracks are written by Miles Kane, Dan Auerbach, and Pat McLaughlin except where noted.

Sunlight in the Shadows track listing
No.	Title	Writer(s)	Length
1.	"Love Is Cruel"		3:14
2.	"Electric Flower"	Kane, Auerbach, Daniel Tashian	2:38
3.	"Sunlight in the Shadows"		3:19
4.	"Coming Down the Road"		2:44
5.	"Always in Over My Head"		2:46
6.	"Blue Skies"	Kane, Auerbach, Tashian	2:44
7.	"My Love"		2:46
8.	"Without You"		2:57
9.	"Sing a Song to Love"	Kane, Auerbach, Patrick Carney	2:55
10.	"Slow Death"	Cyril Jordan, Roy Loney	3:39
11.	"I Pray"		3:37
12.	"Walk On the Ocean"		4:31
Total length:			37:55

== Personnel ==
Adapted from liner notes

- Miles Kane – vocals, guitar on "Sing a Song to Love"

Guest musicians

- Dan Auerbach – guitar, acoustic guitar, mellotron, organ, tambourine, tambura, handclaps, backing vocals
- Nick Bockrath – guitar, pedal steel guitar, handclaps
- Tom Bukovac – guitar, acoustic guitar
- Barrie Cadogan – guitar, baritone guitar
- Tommy Brenneck – bass guitar
- Mike Rojas – piano, acetone, glockenspiel, harpsichord, mellotron, Moog synth, organ, Rhodes piano, Vibraphone, Wurlitzer organ, clavichord
- Patrick Carney – drums, tambourine, shaker, cowbell, and mellotron on track 9
- Malcolm Catto – drums, tambourine, and shaker on all tracks except 9
- Ashley Wilcoxson – backing vocals on tracks 1, 2, 8
- Jake Botts – baritone saxophone and tenor saxophone on tracks 4, 6, 8
- Ray Mason – trombone on tracks 6, 8
- Matt Combs – string arrangements on track 5
- Pat McLaughlin – handclaps on track 10

Production

- Dan Auerbach – producer, mixer
- M. Allen Parker – recording engineer, mixer
- Tate Sablatura, Jonny Ullman – additional engineers
- Henry Bright, Tyler Zwiep – assistant engineers
- Howie Weinberg, Will Borza – mastering

Design

- Natalia Szmidt – artwork layout
- James Kelly – photography

== Charts ==
Chart performance for Sunlight in the Shadows
Chart (2025)	Peak position
French Rock & Metal Albums (SNEP)	22
Scottish Albums (OCC)	6
UK Albums (OCC)	13
