= Cosmic Troubadour =

Studio album by Billy Sheehan
- Released: February 22, 2005
- Genres: Rock, progressive metal, progressive rock
- Length: 58:00
- Label: Favored Nations
- Producer: Pat Regan

Billy Sheehan chronology
Compression (2001)	Cosmic Troubadour (2005)

Professional ratings
Review scores
Source	Rating
AllMusic	3.5/5 stars

Cosmic Troubadour is the second solo album by American rock musician Billy Sheehan, formerly of Talas, David Lee Roth, and Mr. Big. Sheehan sings and plays guitar in addition to his usual bass acrobatics.

== Track listing ==
All tracks by Billy Sheehan

1. "Toss It on the Flame" – 4:56
2. "Back in the Day" – 5:00
3. "The Suspense Is Killing Me" – 3:23
4. "From the Backseat" – 5:37
5. "Don't Look Down" – 3:40
6. "Something She Said" – 2:47
7. "Dreams of Discontent" – 5:10
8. "Dig a Hole" – 3:06
9. "Taj" – 3:42
10. "The Lift" – 3:49
11. "A Tower in the Sky" – 5:46
12. "Long Walk Home" – 3:15
13. "Indisputable Truth" – 3:00
14. "Hope" – 4:52
15. "A Million Tears Ago" (bonus track) – 6:23

== Personnel ==
- Billy Sheehan – bass, ultra bass, vocals, baritone 6 and 12-string electric guitar, drum programming
- Simone Sello – keyboards, drum programming, sampling
- Ray Luzier – drums, drum programming

Additional credits:

- Produced by: Pat Regan
- Executive Producer: Michael Faley
- Mastered by: Brad Vance at DNA Mastering
- Recorded and Mixed at Digital Dungeon Studio
- Drums recorded at Sea Sound Studios
- Photos by: Glen LaFerman
- Layout by: Brian Ames
