= Chicanery (band) =

American experimental rock band

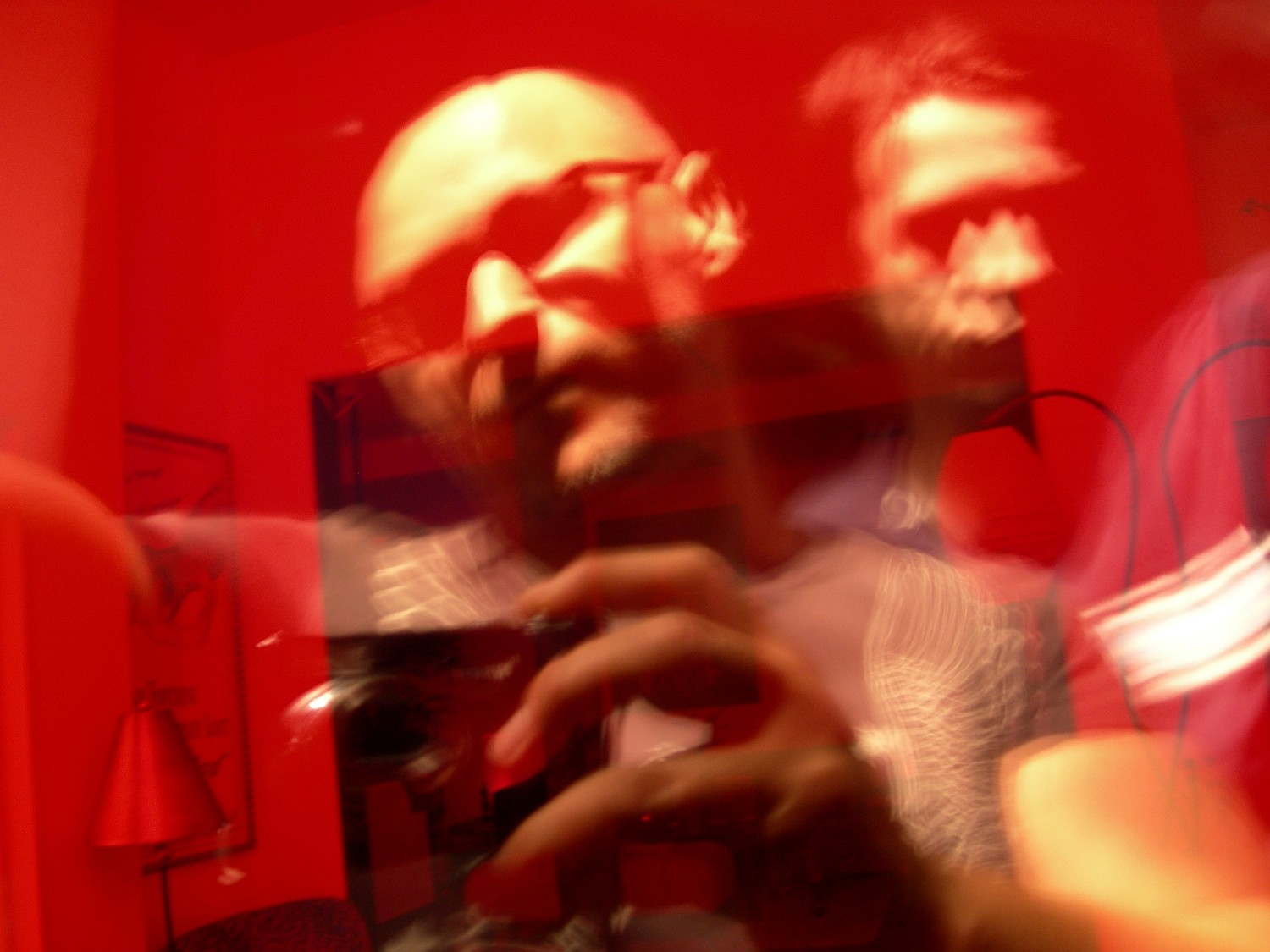
- Chicanery, Warren Cuccurullo and Neil Carlill

Background information
- Origin: Venice, California, U.S.
- Genres: Experimental rock, progressive rock
- Years active: 2005-present
- Label: dPulse Recordings
- Members: Warren Cuccurullo; Neil Carlill; Simone Sello; Terry Bozzio; Ustad Sultan Khan; Joe Travers

Chicanery is an American experimental rock band consisting of Warren Cuccurullo and Neil Carlill. Based in Venice, California, with various members from across the United States and around the world, the focus of the project is to present an alternative musical form that is a psychotic and surreal vision of pop music.

== History ==
The history of Chicanery extends back to the late 1990s in London, England. With Duran Duran at that time, Cuccurullo had founded TV Mania with Nick Rhodes, and he was searching for a lead singer for the second segment of that project. While working in his recording studio, Cuccurullo heard the voice of Neil Carlill, lead singer of the group Delicatessen on one of that band's music videos, and thought that it would fit the project. Cuccurullo found Carlill through the group's record label, and invited him to record some music at the studio. Prior to that meeting, Ustad Sultan Khan and Cuccurullo recorded material together in the summer of 1998, some of which was used for "Cut Me from the Mirror", a track on the Chicanery album.

When Cuccurullo relocated back to Los Angeles after his tenure with Duran Duran ended in 2001, he lost touch with Carlill for a period of time. After they reestablished contact, Carlill sent demos of his latest music to Cuccurullo. Four of those tracks were used on the Chicanery album. In 2005 the bulk of the tracks for the debut album were cut in Los Angeles at Red Rum Studios, and some of the music was recorded in Massachusetts. Often, tracks would be recorded at home studios, sent to Simone Sello, and then on to the larger studios for recording and mixing to create the finished product. The album was released on May 11, 2010 through dPulse Recordings.

Also with Cuccurullo and Carlill on selected sessions are long-time Cuccurullo collaborator Terry Bozzio, Frank Zappa alumnus Joe Travers, and various other guests.

== Discography ==
=== Album ===
Year	Album	Label
2010	Chicanery	dPulse Recordings

=== Singles ===
Year	Song	Album	Label
2010	"Hubert Selby Song"	Chicanery	dPulse Recordings
2010	"Gold Pavillions"	Chicanery	dPulse Recordings

== Videography ==
=== Music videos ===
Year	Title	Director
2010	"Cut Me From the Mirror"	Mariano Di Martino
