= Don't Forget Who You Are =

Studio album by Miles Kane
- Released: 3 June 2013
- Genre: Indie rock
- Length: 32:42
- Label: Columbia
- Producer: Ian Broudie

Miles Kane chronology
Give Up (2013)	Don't Forget Who You Are (2013)	Coup de Grace (2018)

Singles from Don't Forget Who You Are
- 1. "Give Up" Released: 22 February 2013; 2. "Don't Forget Who You Are" Released: 3 June 2013; 3. "Taking Over" Released: 19 August 2013; 4. "Better Than That" Released: 14 October 2013

Don't Forget Who You Are is the second studio album by indie-rock musician Miles Kane. It was released on 3 June 2013 under Columbia Records. The album title is named from the second song off the album, "Don't Forget Who You Are" which was featured in the video game FIFA 14, while "Give Up" is featured in EA Sports UFC.

== Critical reception ==
Professional ratings
Aggregate scores
Source	Rating
Metacritic	71/100
Review scores
Source	Rating
Allmusic	4/5 stars
The Guardian	3/5 stars
The Independent	4/5 stars
NME	8/10
Drowned in Sound	5/10

== Track list ==
No.	Title	Writer(s)	Length
1.	"Taking Over"	Miles Kane, Ian Broudie	3:25
2.	"Don't Forget Who You Are"	Kane, Ian Broudie	3:22
3.	"Better Than That"	Kane, Andy Partridge	2:56
4.	"Out of Control"	Kane, Ian Broudie, Guy Chambers	3:16
5.	"Bombshells"	Kane, Ian Broudie	2:16
6.	"Tonight"	Kane, Kid Harpoon	2:59
7.	"What Condition Am I In?"	Kane, Andy Partridge	2:32
8.	"Fire in My Heart"	Kane, Paul Weller	2:51
9.	"You're Gonna Get It"	Kane, Paul Weller	2:32
10.	"Give Up"	Kane, Kid Harpoon	2:45
11.	"Darkness in Our Hearts"	Kane, Andy Partridge	3:40

Deluxe Edition bonus tracks
No.	Title	Writer(s)	Length
12.	"Start of Something Big"	Kane, Paul Weller	2:17
13.	"Caught in the Act"	Kane, Kid Harpoon	2:55
14.	"First of My Kind"	Kane, Eugene McGuinness, Alex Turner	3:13
