= One Man Band (Miles Kane album) =

Studio album by Miles Kane
- Released: 4 August 2023
- Recorded: 2022–2023
- Studios: Kempston Street Studios (Liverpool, England)
- Genre: Indie rock
- Length: 33:06
- Label: Modern Sky
- Producer: James Skelly

Miles Kane chronology
| Change the Show (2022) | One Man Band (2023) | Sunlight in the Shadows (2025) |

Singles from One Man Band
- 1. "Troubled Son" Released: 18 April 2023; 2. "Baggio" Released: 17 May 2023; 3. "The Wonder" Released: 19 June 2023; 4. "One Man Band" Released: 31 July 2023

One Man Band is the fifth studio album by English rock musician Miles Kane, released on 4 August 2023 by Modern Sky. It was written by Kane in late 2022 on guitar mainly in Northern England. It was produced between December 2022 and January in Liverpool by Kane's cousin and The Coral's frontman, James Skelly, alongside guest musicians including Tom Ogden. The album artwork appears to be a black and white picture that depicts Kane looking outside of a transparent glass material over what might be a small town or city somewhere.

One Man Band goes back to Kane's indie rock roots. Instrumentally, it features mainly guitar, as Kane made a conscious effort to not include any piano or brass.

== Background and recording ==
Following the release of the musician's fourth studio album Change the Show, Kane went back to Northern England in late 2022 to write new music. He enlisted Blossoms' frontman Tom Ogden to help, and went to Stockport to write with him. Later he and producer James Skelly sent demos "back-and-forth."

In December 2022, Kane started recording material in Liverpool. Kane's cousin and The Coral's frontman, James Skelly, produced the album. Kane described the sessions as a "family affair", with his other cousin, Ian Skelly, joining them on drums. Kane further added "It's the first time we've ever all worked together. It's weird how it just fell into place and it feels right. It probably wouldn't have worked if we'd tried it when we were younger, [but] it was a really nice experience to feel that support and enthusiasm." The recording sessions were completed by January 2023.

== Composition ==
=== Musical style and influences ===
One Man Band is a departure from Change the Show's northern soul sound, with Kane going back to guitar in its composition. Kane cited The Strokes and The Libertines as influences.

=== Lyrics and themes ===
Kane said the single "Troubled Son" represented the album as a whole, adding "It's like looking at myself in the mirror and acknowledging my faults, my fears, and sort of showing my journey." Lyrically, the song conveys an emotional theme around upbeat instrumentals. The album's second single "Baggio" was inspired by a meeting with Kane's "hero", Italian former football Roberto Baggio.

== Artwork and title ==
The artwork features a black and white picture of Kane looking out of a window. He said of the cover, "A friend took that and it's of me, not too posed. I wanted it all to be sort of stripped back and as real as can be, to be honest."

== Critical reception ==
Professional ratings
Aggregate scores
| Source | Rating |
|---|---|
| Metacritic | 67/100 |
Review scores
| Source | Rating |
| Daily Express | 5/5 stars |
| Clash | 7/10 |
| Far Out | 4/5 stars |
| The Independent | 9/10 |
| NME | 3/5 stars |
| The Times | 4/5 stars |
| XS Noize | 4/5 stars |

One Man Band received a score of 67 out of 100 on review aggregator Metacritic based on four critics' reviews, indicating "generally favorable" reception. In a five-star review for Daily Express, Bethan Shufflebotham wrote "Miles' lyrics inherently evoke feelings of isolation, and despite the sometimes sombre subject matters, this album approaches them with a relentless amount of spirit." The album's instrumentals were also praised in the review, with Shufflebotham calling it "an air guitarist's dream".

Kelly Scanlon of Far Out Magazine wrote, "The truth is, going home worked because this feels like Kane at his most authentic" in her four-star review of the album. Tilly Foulkes of NME singled out tracks like "The Best Is Yet to Come" for its "wiggling bass [...] skipping and jumping beneath his sultry, smug vocals" as well as "Never Taking Me Alive", which they called "infectiously feral", writing that its "scuzzy bass licks and urgent lyrical delivery encourages you to adopt that same attitude as the rebellious movie stars it name-checks". Foulkes ended their review by stating Kane is "able to make real uplifting and imaginative indie bops".

== Track listing ==
All lyrics are written by Miles Kane.

One Man Band track listing
| No. | Title | Music | Length |
|---|---|---|---|
| 1. | "Troubled Son" | Miles Kane; Tom Ogden | 3:20 |
| 2. | "The Best Is Yet to Come" | Kane; Kieran Shudall | 2:10 |
| 3. | "One Man Band" | Kane; Jamie Biles; James Skelly | 3:38 |
| 4. | "Never Taking Me Alive" | Kane; Shudall | 2:34 |
| 5. | "Heartbreaks (The New Sensation)" | Kane; Shudall; Skelly | 2:30 |
| 6. | "The Wonder" | Kane; Ogden | 2:59 |
| 7. | "Baggio" | Kane; Biles; Andy Burrows | 3:41 |
| 8. | "Ransom" | Kane; Biles | 3:13 |
| 9. | "Doubles" | Kane | 2:44 |
| 10. | "Heal" | Kane; Ogden | 3:18 |
| 11. | "Scared of Love" | Kane; Skelly | 2:59 |
| Total length: | | | 33:06 |

== Personnel ==
Credits adapted from the album's liner notes.

- Miles Kane – lead vocals (all tracks), guitars (tracks 1–9)
- James Skelly – production (all tracks), guitars (3, 4, 7–9), background vocals (5, 7), acoustic guitar (6, 7, 10)
- Chris Taylor – mixing (all tracks), keyboards (1–3, 6, 10), Moog (4), synthesizer (8)
- Robin Schmidt – mastering
- Ian Skelly – drums (1–9), percussion (1, 2, 4–9)
- Charlie Salt – background vocals (1, 4, 6–9), bass (1, 7); guitars, bass (7); organ (8, 9), photography
- Tom Ogden – background vocals (1, 6, 9)
- Paul Duffy – bass (2–6, 8, 9), background vocals (3, 4)
- Kieran Shudall – background vocals (2, 4, 5), guitars (2, 5)
- Jamie Biles – programming (3)
- Aidan Cochrane – design

== Charts ==
Chart performance for One Man Band
| Chart (2023) | Peak position |
|---|---|
| Belgian Albums (Ultratop Flanders) | 12 |
| Belgian Albums (Ultratop Wallonia) | 125 |
| Scottish Albums (Official Charts) | 5 |
| UK Albums (Official Charts) | 5 |
