= Come Closer (Miles Kane song) =

Single by Miles Kane

from the album Colour of the Trap
- B-side: "Before It's Midnight"
- Released: 18 February 2011
- Recorded: 2010
- Genre: Rock, alternative rock
- Length: 2:53
- Label: Sony Music Entertainment UK Limited
- Songwriter: Miles Kane
- Producer: Dan Carey

Miles Kane singles chronology
"Inhaler" (2010)	"Come Closer" (2011)	"Rearrange" (2011)

"Come Closer" is a song by the English musician Miles Kane and was released on 18 February 2011. In interviews he has described this song as sleazy. The song was inspired by John Lennon. It was released as a limited run on 7" vinyl and as digital download. The first 500 7" came with a signed set of lyrics by Miles Kane.

== Music video ==
The official video was released online on 16 December 2010. It was filmed at a studio in North London called the Mile Way club. The director of the video was Dan Sully. The video features Daisy Lowe who is a close friend of Miles, and Hope Watson.

== Track listing ==
No.	Title	Length
1.	"Come Closer"	3:00
2.	"Before It's Midnight"	2:58
3.	"Kaka Boom" (Eugene McGuinness)	2:58
4.	"Come Closer" (Music video)	2:57

== Chart performance ==
Chart (2010/11)	Peak position
Belgium (Ultratip Bubbling Under Wallonia)	23
France (SNEP)	75
UK Singles (The Official Charts Company)	85

== Release history ==
Region	Date	Format	Label
United Kingdom	18 February 2011	Digital download	Sony Music Entertainment
