= Jane Savidge =

British writer

- Born: Derby, England
- Occupations: Writer, public relations
- Known for: Co-founder of Savage & Best PR

Jane Savidge is a British writer and public relations agent.

As co-founder and head of public relations company Savage & Best, Savidge is widely credited as being one of the main instigators of the Britpop musical movement that swept the UK in the mid 1990s. During this time Savage and Best represented many of the artists associated with the scene including Suede, Pulp, The Verve, Elastica, Longpigs, Menswear, Marion, Ultrasound, Echobelly, The Auteurs, Black Box Recorder, 60 Ft. Dolls and Kula Shaker. Savage & Best also started a record label, Parkway Records, in 1995 which released records by Powder (fronted by Pearl Lowe) and the all-girl punk band Fluffy. Savidge's first book Lunch With The Wild Frontiers: A History Of Britpop And Excess in 13 and a 1/2 Chapters was published by Jawbone in May 2019. Savidge’s second book, Here They Come With Their Make Up On: Suede, Coming Up And More Adventures Beyond The Wild Frontiers was published by Jawbone in April 2022. Her latest book, Pulp’s This Is Hardcore was published by Bloomsbury on March 7, 2024.

== Education ==
Savidge was born in Derby and educated at the elite private school Nottingham High School, before obtaining a degree in Philosophy at the University of Nottingham.

== Career ==
In 1987, after leaving university, Savidge began a PR career working at Mel Bell Publicity representing Danielle Dax, The Wonder Stuff, Gaye Bykers on Acid, Green on Red, The Rhythm Sisters, Daniel Johnston, Soul Asylum, Thin White Rope and US record label Homestead Records. In June 1988, Savidge started work as a press officer at Virgin Records and represented Roy Orbison, Youssou N'Dour, Gary Moore, Jim Steinman, Suicidal Tendencies, Mary Margaret O'Hara and Peter Gabriel's Real World label amongst others. In 1990, Savidge left Virgin Records to join John Best at Best in Press and the company began managing publicity for bands such as Cocteau Twins, Pixies, Pale Saints, Dead Can Dance, The Farm, Moose, Lush, Curve, Suede and The Verve. The company was situated in the Camden Town area of London and many of the bands on its books were part of the shoegazing scene which Melody Maker later dubbed "The Scene That Celebrates Itself". Some members of this scene (Blur, Lush, Suede) would go on to play a leading part in Britpop but it was Savidge's PR success with Suede – eighteen front covers of UK publications before their debut album was released – that led to the acquisition of three Music Week PR Awards and the company morphing into its Savage & Best incarnation. Savage & Best are often acknowledged as launching Britpop since the company represented many of the movement's protagonists at the time including Suede, Pulp, The Auteurs, Black Box Recorder, Echobelly, Menswear, Elastica, Dubstar, Space, Kula Shaker, 60 Ft. Dolls, Ultrasound, Longpigs, Marion and The Verve. The latter were managed by Savage & Best for their first two albums.

Savidge was featured in the film Live Forever: The Rise and Fall of Brit Pop, a 2003 documentary film written and directed by John Dower.

Savage & Best represented many other artists and projects during the 1990s including Tank Girl, The Jesus and Mary Chain, Spiritualized, Texas, The Fall, Nine Inch Nails, Erasure, The Charlatans, The Cranberries, Faithless, Fluke, and Fat Les. Savage & Best also founded a record label, Parkway Records, and released records by Powder (fronted by Pearl Lowe) and the all-girl punk outfit Fluffy.

In December 1999, Savage & Best dissolved and Savidge formed Savidge & Savidge. The following year Savidge again represented Damien Hirst (through a friendship with Fat Les) for Hirst's Art Tube project and for Keith Allen's Glastonbury Play which featured Hirst's stage designs. Savidge continued to represent Suede and Keith Allen amongst other artists but also diversified into club PR handling PR accounts for Soho House and Babington House as well as Home in Leicester Square. Around this time she also represented A.R. Rahman, multi-million selling composer of Andrew Lloyd Webber's Bombay Dreams.

Savidge began representing David A. Stewart in 2001, and helped launch Stewart and Paul Allen's £100 million Hospital Club project in Covent Garden. She also set up The Hospital Committee responsible for Club membership and in recent years Savidge has launched PR initiatives for Digital Animal and MOJN whilst continued to represent many of the artists she represented earlier in her career. Savidge's recent representations include James, Prefab Sprout, Chris Rea, The Stranglers, Don Black, Michael Nyman, Tony Mortimer, Gang of Four, Unkle Bob, Gregory Darling, and Michael Des Barres.

== Writing ==
Savidge wrote sleeve notes to accompany all eight Eurythmics albums which were rereleased in 2005 and has written sleeve notes for other artists including Suede, James, Ride and Curve.

Savidge's first book Lunch With The Wild Frontiers: A History Of Britpop And Excess in 13 and a 1/2 Chapters was published by Jawbone in May 2019 to much critical acclaim. The Glasgow Herald hailed the book as a "20th century glitterball take on Machiavelli's The Prince". Q magazine also praised the book as "an eye-opening, read in one sitting autobiography", whilst Classic Pop magazine awarded it five stars and heralded it is "an exhilarating and hilarious expose of the scene, recounted in a gloriously gossipy style with a vibrancy that sees it begging to be adapted for the screen, an addictive read which lifts the lid on the stories that hit the headlines as well as a fair few that were deliberately concealed. By far the finest book on Britpop to date." Record Collector went further, calling her book "a rum old blast from a wonderfully ridiculous past whilst the fun lasts”, whilst Stylist magazine saw it as "a tale of the messy, exciting and truly invigorating whirl that created an unparalleled moment in British music. It's also a fascinating and funny step back in time to a world where demo cassettes and weekly music papers ruled Britain."

Savidge’s second book, Here They Come With Their Make Up On: Suede, Coming Up And More Adventures Beyond The Wild Frontiers was published by Jawbone in April 2022. It quickly became an Amazon best-seller, and received similar plaudits, Classic Pop magazine hailing it as "a scintillating snapshot of a time when life really was lived in the fast lane", whilst Louder Than War said "Jane Savidge gives a really enjoyable account, full of many great anecdotes and asides as she gives the sort of insights that only come with being there at the time.

Savidge’s third book, This is Hardcore - an analysis of Pulp’s classic 1998 album of the same name - was published by Bloomsbury as part of their 33 1/3 series in March 2024. Classic Pop hailed the book as being "every bit as entertaining and gossipy as its predecessors", whilst Critical Popcorn maintained it is "a brilliant read, the best book I've read in ages." Elsewhere, the Literary Review suggested it is a book that "provides an excellent survey of a record that has only gained in stature since its release," whilst Cult Following called it, "Essential reading, plain and simple."

Jane has recently ghost-written Marco Pirroni’s autobiography, Your Money Or Your Life, and is working on another book due for publication in 2027.

== Awards ==
Savidge has won several awards for PR in music. In 1991 Savidge won a Music Week award for Curve. In 1992 the Music Week Best PR Campaign went to Savage & Best for Suede. In 1995 and 1997 Savidge received 2nd place Music Week PR Campaign awards for Suede.
