= First of My Kind =

EP by Miles Kane
- Released: 20 April 2012
- Recorded: 2011
- Genre: Indie rock
- Length: 12:36
- Label: Sony Music Entertainment
- Producer: Skream

Miles Kane chronology
Colour of the Trap (2011)	First of My Kind (2012)	Give Up (2013)

First of My Kind is an EP by the English indie rock musician Miles Kane. It was released on 21 April 2012 as a Limited Edition Record Store Day Vinyl, then as a digital download the next day, both in the United Kingdom. The title song peaked at number 65 on the UK Singles Chart. The song premiered on BBC Radio 1 as Zane Lowe's 'Hottest Record In The World' on 14 March 2012. Production on the title track was handled by dubstep pioneer Skream in a move away from his more familiar sound.

== Music video ==
A music video to accompany the release of "First of My Kind" was first released onto YouTube on 11 April 2012 at a total length of three minutes and ten seconds.

== Track listing ==
Limited Record Store Day 10"
No.	Title	Writer(s)	Length
1.	"First of My Kind"	Miles Kane, Eugene McGuinness, Alex Turner	3:12
2.	"Night Runner"	Kane, Gruff Rhys	3:51
3.	"Looking Out My Window" (Tom Jones cover)		2:23
4.	"Colour of the Trap" (Acoustic)	Miles Kane, Alex Turner	3:10

== Chart performance ==
Chart (2012)	Peak position
Belgium (Ultratip Bubbling Under Flanders)	30
UK Singles (The Official Charts Company)	65

== Release history ==
Region	Date	Format	Label
United Kingdom	20 April 2012	Digital download	Columbia
United Kingdom	21 April 2012	Limited edition 10" vinyl	Columbia
