= Lodger (British band) =

British indie rock band

- Origin: London, England
- Genres: Indie rock, neo-psychedelia
- Years active: 1997–1998
- Label: Island
- Past members: Pearl Lowe; Danny Goffey; Neil Carlill; Will Foster

Lodger were a British indie rock supergroup containing members of Powder, Supergrass, and Delicatessen. They released three singles and an album in 1998 before the members went on to different projects, notably Will Foster later formed The Tears in 2004, along with ex-Suede members, Brett Anderson and Bernard Butler.

== History ==
The band was formed in 1997 by Supergrass drummer Danny Goffey and his girlfriend Pearl Lowe, the former vocalist with Powder. The line-up was completed by co-vocalist Neil Carlill and guitarist Will Foster, both of Delicatessen. Lowe and Carlill's dual vocals drew comparisons with Nancy Sinatra and Lee Hazlewood. They signed to Island Records and their début single "I'm Leaving" reached number 40 on the UK Singles Chart. Two further singles, "Always Round Here" and "Small Change", prior to the band's only album, Walk in the Park (August 1998).

== Discography ==
=== Albums ===
- Walk in the Park (1998), Island

=== Singles ===
- "I'm Leaving" (1998), Island – UK #40
- "Always Round Here" (1998), Island – UK #97
- "Small Change" (1998), Island – UK #96
