= Compression (album) =

Studio album by Billy Sheehan
- Released: August 21, 2001
- Genre: Rock
- Length: 47:00
- Label: Favored Nations
- Producer: Pat Regan

Billy Sheehan chronology
Compression (2001)	Cosmic Troubadour (2005)

Professional ratings
Review scores
Source	Rating
AllMusic	4/5 stars

Compression is the first solo album by American rock musician Billy Sheehan, formerly of Talas, David Lee Roth, and Mr. Big.

== Track listing ==
All tracks by Billy Sheehan

1. "Bleed Along the Way" – 3:55
2. "Oblivion" – 4:29
3. "Somethin's Gotta Give" – 4:23
4. "What Once Was..." – 4:09
5. "Chameleon" – 4:06
6. "Perfect Groove" – 5:37
7. "One Good Reason" – 3:02
8. "Three Days Blind" – 4:22
9. "Caroline" – 4:48
10. "All Mixed Up" – 4:06
11. "Feed Your Head" – 4:30

== Personnel ==
- Billy Sheehan – bass guitar, ultra bass, vocals, baritone 6 and 12 string electric guitars, drum programming
- Simone Sello – keyboards, drum programming, sampling
- Steve Vai – guitar solo on track 5
- Terry Bozzio – drums on tracks 1 and 2

== Other appearances ==
The track "Chameleon" appears on the Steve Vai video album Live at the Astoria, London.
