= Miles Kane =

English musician (born 1986)

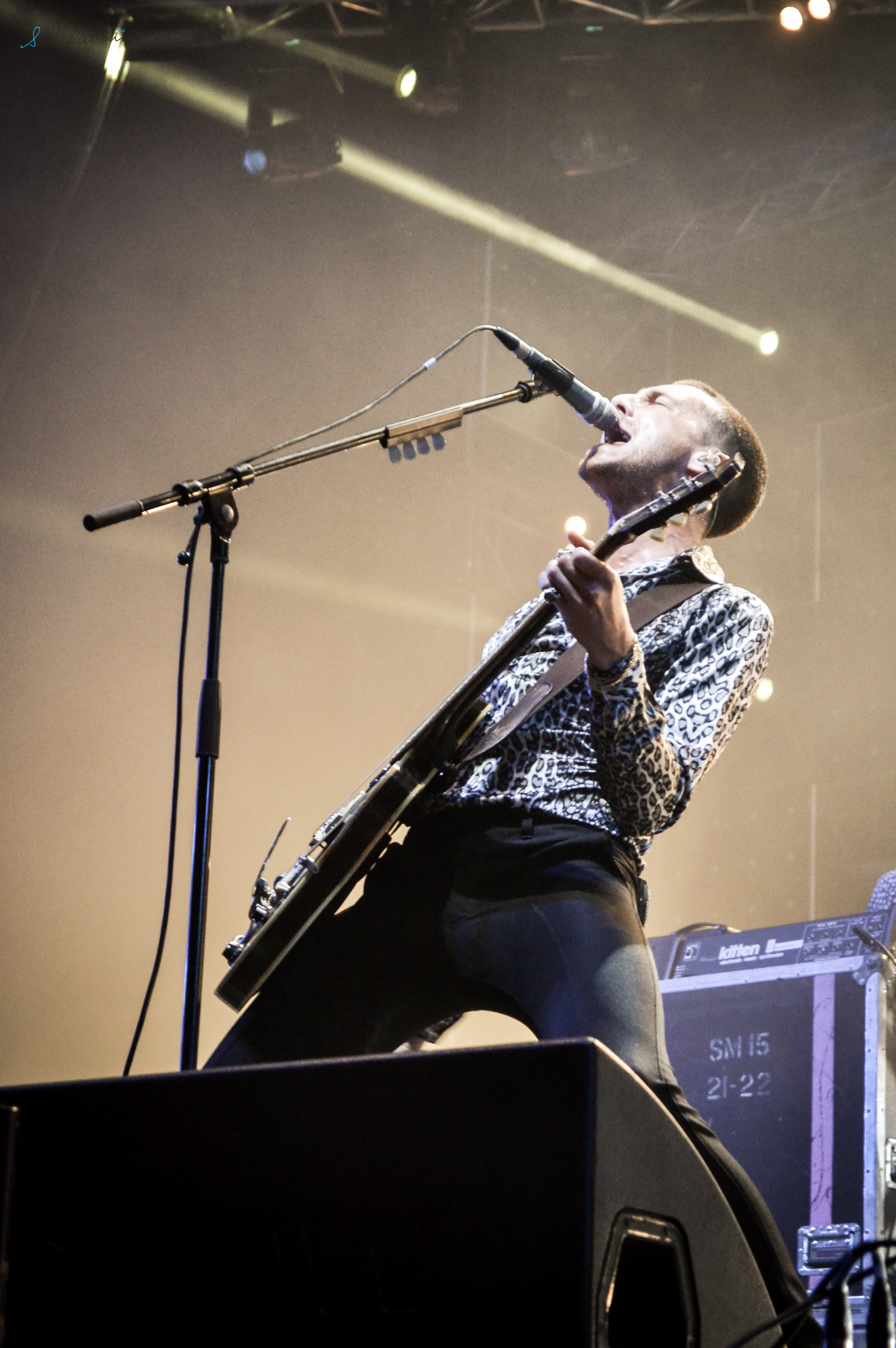
- Kane in 2024

Background information
- Born: Miles Peter Kane; 17 March 1986 (age 40); Birkenhead, Merseyside, England
- Origin: Meols, Merseyside, England
- Genres: Indie rock; mod revival; garage rock; chamber pop; glam rock
- Occupations: Singer; musician; songwriter
- Instruments: Vocals; guitar; bass guitar; saxophone; piano
- Years active: 2004–present
- Labels: Columbia; Domino; Virgin EMI; BMG; Modern Sky
- Member of: The Last Shadow Puppets; The Jaded Hearts Club
- Formerly of: The Little Flames; The Rascals
- Website: mileskane.com

Miles Peter Kane (born 17 March 1986) is an English singer and musician, best known as a solo artist and the co-frontman of the Last Shadow Puppets. He was also the frontman of the Rascals before the band announced their break-up in August 2009.

He has focused on a solo career since 2011 but remains a member of the Last Shadow Puppets (2007-present) alongside Arctic Monkeys frontman Alex Turner. His debut solo album, Colour of the Trap, was released on 9 May 2011. Kane's latest solo album, Sunlight in the Shadows, was released on 17 October 2025 through Easy Eye Sound.

== Early life ==
Miles Peter Kane was born in Birkenhead, Wirral and was raised in nearby Meols. He played the saxophone as a child. His cousins, James and Ian Skelly, two founding members of The Coral, had a great influence on his music taste while he was growing up.

== Career ==
=== Band projects ===
==== The Little Flames ====
At age 18, Kane joined The Little Flames as guitarist in December 2004. The band signed to Deltasonic and were compared to label mates the Coral and high-profile bands such as the Arctic Monkeys. They also went on to tour with bands like the Coral, the Zutons, the Dead 60s and the Arctic Monkeys. The band split in 2007 prior to releasing their debut album, which was eventually released in 2016.

==== The Rascals ====
Kane, on vocals and lead guitar, was joined by Greg Mighall on drums and Joe Edwards on bass guitar and occasional backing vocals. Kane took on the main songwriting duties for the band. The band, who have known each other from childhood, continued where the Little Flames left off; they signed with Deltasonic Records again, only with fewer members this time.

The Rascals released their debut EP in December 2007, just seven months after they got together. Entitled Out of Dreams it featured 4 tracks but did not achieve chart success. Despite this, they were noted as a band to watch, championed in particular by NME, following a well-received support slot on the Arctic Monkeys' 2007 tour. Their first album 'Rascalize' was released on 23 June 2008. The Rascals have a small role in the film Awaydays playing an Echo & the Bunnymen cover.

==== The Last Shadow Puppets: The Age Of The Understatement (2007–2008) ====
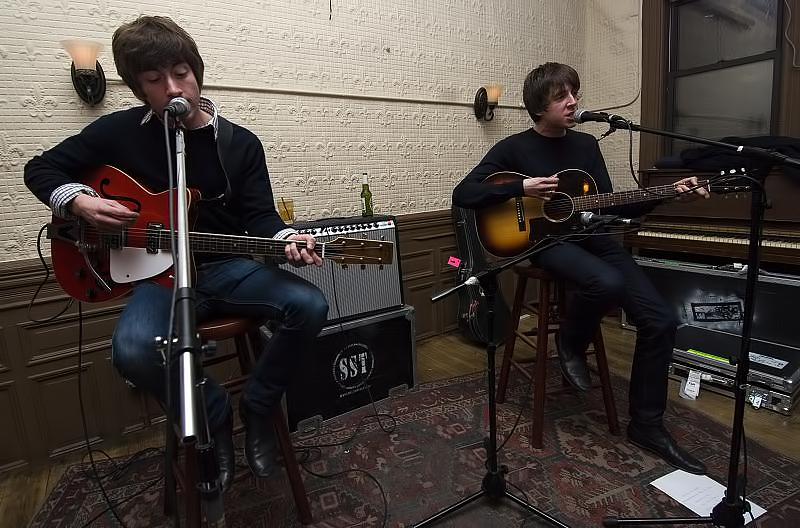
Kane (right) and Alex Turner (left) performing as the Last Shadow Puppets

Whilst touring with the Arctic Monkeys, Kane and front man Alex Turner began to experiment together backstage, which resulted in the composition of new tracks. Realizing there was a future in their songwriting partnership, they formed the Last Shadow Puppets. The duo decided to travel to the West Coast of France with producer James Ford where they recorded their debut album The Age of the Understatement in just two weeks. Their album went straight to number 1 in the UK Album Charts with the single of the same name reaching number 1 in the Indie Single Charts, and subsequent singles also reaching high spots. They first played together live in the UK, doing a secret set at Glastonbury with a special guest appearance from Jack White, to whom Kane lent his iPod so White could learn the solo. The band's album won the Mojo Breakthrough Award. In December 2015 it was confirmed on the band's official Facebook and YouTube accounts, that the second album was due in spring 2016.

==== The Last Shadow Puppets: Everything You've Come To Expect (2015–2016) ====
After mooted rumours of a new album with Alex Turner in Kane's other band The Last Shadow Puppets. On 19 October 2015 Owen Pallett, who contributed the string arrangements on The Age of the Understatement, confirmed work on a second The Last Shadow Puppets album. In November 2015, producer James Ford confirmed that work on the second album had been completed.

On 10 January 2016, the band released their first single since 2008. The song, "Bad Habits", was accompanied with a music video filmed in the same style as the first two teaser trailers. On 21 January 2016, the band announced that their second album would be entitled Everything You've Come to Expect, and would feature the return of all three previous band members, as well as the addition of bass player Zach Dawes. The title track, "Everything You've Come to Expect", was released as a single on 10 March 2016. It was followed by the release of "Aviation" on 16 March 2016 and the release of "Miracle Aligner" on 28 March 2016. The album was released on 1 April 2016.

In October 2025, Kane appeared alongside newcomer Brooke Combe, in "Teardrops," originally done by Womack and Womack.

=== Solo music ===
In early 2009, after his last tour with the Rascals, Miles Kane left the band to focus on a solo career. He signed with Columbia Records and began recording his solo album with Dan Carey and Dan the Automator, who had previously worked with Gorillaz and Kasabian.

==== Colour of the Trap (2010–2012) ====
Kane's debut single, "Inhaler" was released on 22 November 2010, and he did a series of solo shows throughout November, as well as supported the Courteeners at several shows in December. He then continued solo performances in January and February 2011, before supporting Beady Eye at eight shows in March. Kane released another single, "Come Closer" on 20 February 2011, reaching No. 85 on the UK Singles Chart. "Rearrange", the third single from his debut album, was released on 27 March 2011 and reached No. 149 on the UK Singles Chart.

The album, titled Colour of the Trap, was released on 9 May 2011. One track, "My Fantasy" features backing vocals from Noel Gallagher, while another, "Happenstance" is a duet between Kane and French actress Clémence Poésy. Half of the tracks on the album were co-written by Alex Turner, Kane's partner in the Last Shadow Puppets. Kane supported the Arctic Monkeys at two shows in Sheffield in June 2011, and was their support act on their Australian tour in January 2012. It was also announced on 19 October 2011 that Kane was to support Kasabian on their UK tour in December 2011.

==== Don't Forget Who You Are (2013–2015) ====
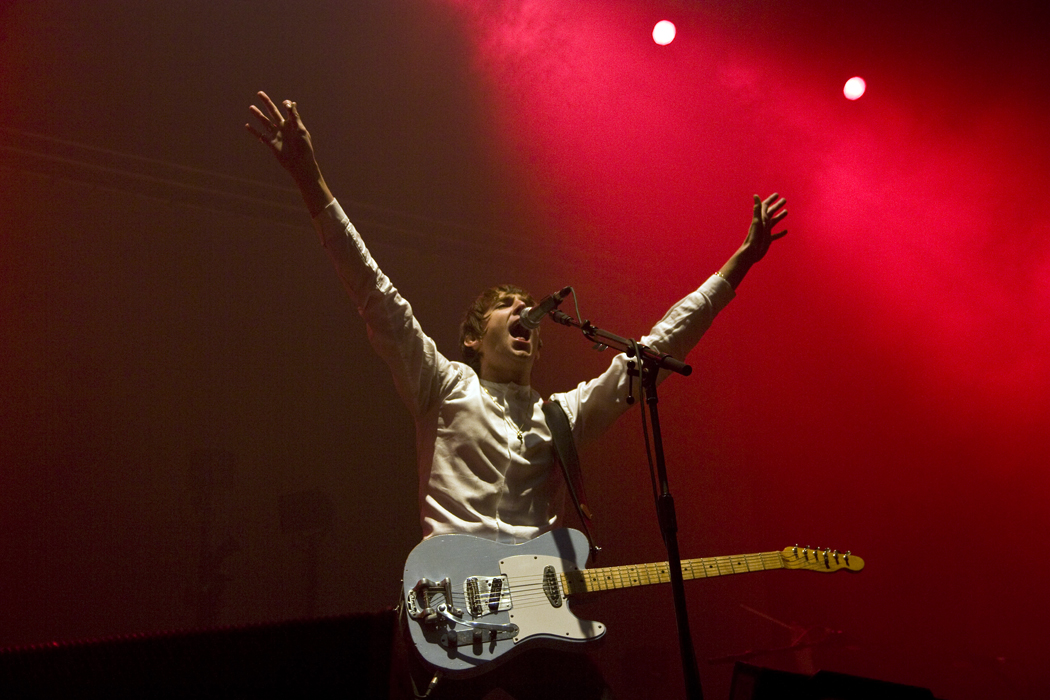
Kane performing in 2012

On 24 February 2013, Kane released an EP titled Give Up, charting at No. 62. On 13 March 2013, Kane revealed he would be releasing his second album, entitled Don't Forget Who You Are, in the spring. On 19 March 2013, a UK tour in May and June to coincide with the album was announced. On 30 April 2013, Kane released the single "Don't Forget Who You Are", which features the B-side "Get Right" which was written by Kane and Alex Turner. The album was released on 3 June 2013, debuting at No. 8 in the UK charts. It was produced by Ian Broudie of The Lightning Seeds, and features two tracks co-written with Paul Weller ("Fire in My Heart" and "You're Gonna Get It").

Kane played the opening day of Glastonbury 2013 on the John Peel stage, before joining the Arctic Monkeys in their headline slot, to play on "505". Two further singles from the album, "Taking Over" and "Better Than That" were released in August and October 2013 respectively. In 2015, Kane collaborated with Mark Ronson on the opening track "Johanna" of the soundtrack to the film Mortdecai, contributing vocals.

==== Coup de Grace, Dr. Pepper's Jaded Hearts Club Band, and Change the Show (2017–2024) ====
In September 2017, Kane sang in a Beatles tribute band named Dr. Pepper's Jaded Hearts Club Band. Other members included Muse singer and guitarist Matt Bellamy, Nine Inch Nails drummer Ilan Rubin, and Zutons drummer Sean Payne.

In March 2018, Kane told the Evening Standard his new album would tentatively be called Coup de Grace, and would be released in the summer of 2018.

In April 2018, Kane released "Loaded", the first single to be taken from Coup De Grace. Its music video was released the following month.

In June 2018, Kane officially announced that Coup De Grace would be released on 10 August via Virgin EMI. The album's title track was also released the same day. The following week, Kane announced a headline European tour for October 2018. Zach Dawes, Tyler Parkford, and Loren Humphrey, who are live members of The Last Shadow Puppets, play on the majority of the album and also co-wrote three tracks with Kane.

In November 2019, Kane supported Liam Gallagher on his UK and Ireland tour.

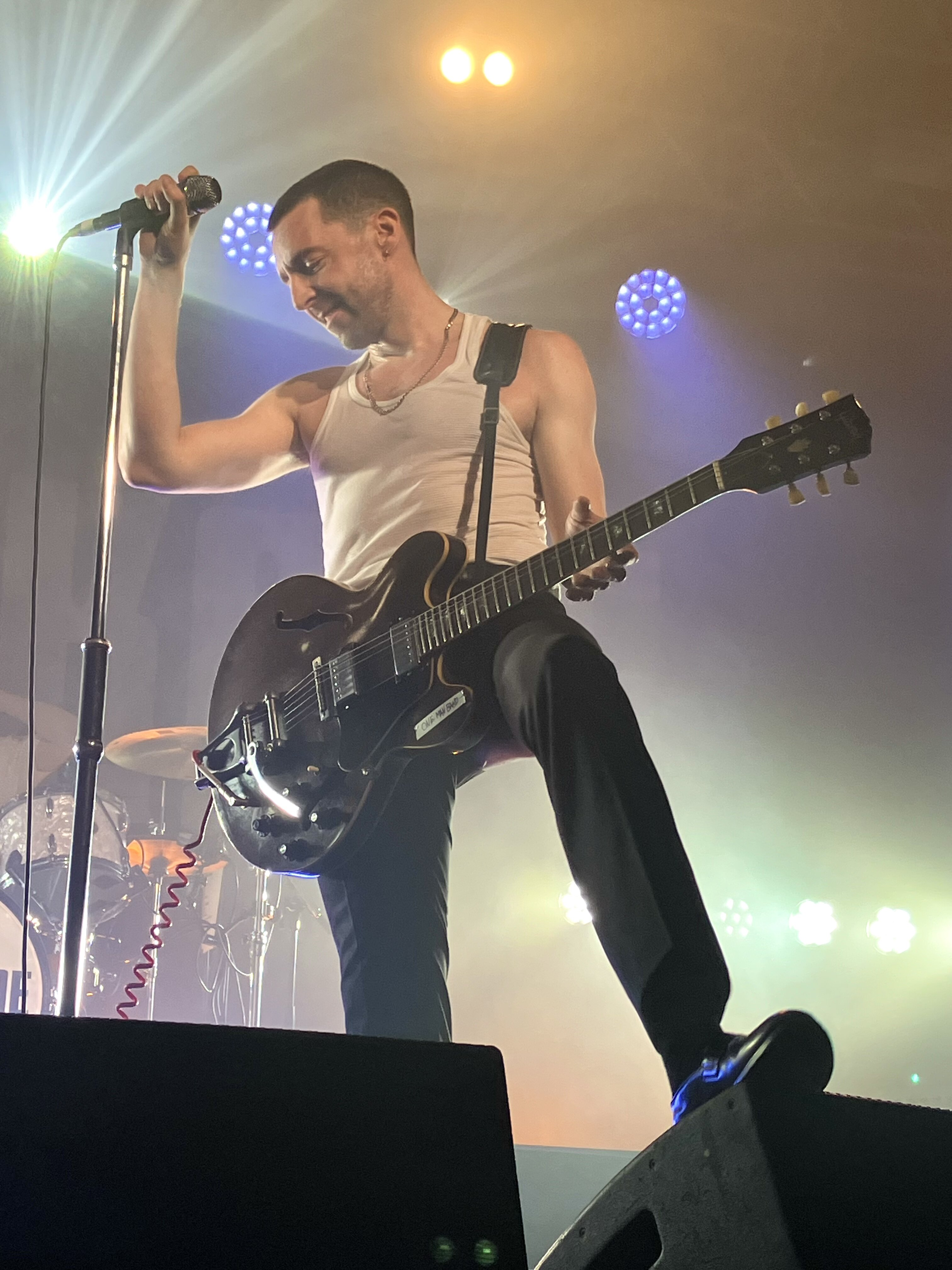
Kane performing in 2024

Kane was featured on the song "Dealer", released on Lana Del Rey's eighth studio album, Blue Banisters. Kane wrote the song with Del Rey in 2017, for a planned collaborative album between him, Del Rey, and Zach Dawes. His vocals were credited on the album.

Kane's fifth solo album, One Man Band, was released in August 2023. This album marks his first collaboration with his cousins Ian and James Skelly; the former played drums and the latter produced the record.

==== Sunlight in the Shadows (2025–present) ====
Sunlight in the Shadows was released on 17 October 2025 through Easy Eye Sound.

Produced by Dan Auerbach of The Black Keys, the album has 12 tracks and has been described as psyche-infused rock and roll.

== Personal life ==
Kane lived in London until August 2015, when he moved to Los Angeles, to work on the second Last Shadow Puppets record. There, he lived "seven minutes away" from friend and fellow band member, Alex Turner. In 2019, Kane moved back to Bethnal Green.

He began supporting Liverpool F.C. in 2010, having previously followed Manchester United. He is a close friend of former Everton and England footballer Leighton Baines. Kane is asthmatic and carries an inhaler while touring.

=== Public image ===
In 2015, he was named one of GQ's 50 best dressed British men.

In 2024 Kane released a special edition football shirt with Camden store Modfather Clothing and Admiral Sports in line with Euro 2024.

== Awards and nominations ==
Year	Organisation	Nominated work	Award	Result
2009	NME Awards	Miles Kane	Sexiest Male	Nominated
2011	Q Awards	Miles Kane	Breakthrough Artist	Nominated
2012	NME Awards	Miles Kane	Best Solo Artist	Nominated
2013	NME Awards	Miles Kane	Best Dressed (Afterparty)	Won
2013	NME Awards	Miles Kane	Best Solo Artist	Nominated
2015	NME Awards	Miles Kane	The Elvis Presley Best Fan Interaction Award (Social Media & Interviews)	Won
2017	NME Awards	Miles Kane & Alex Turner	Best On-Stage Partnership	Won

== Discography ==
Note: This only includes artist's solo career, not other projects such as the Last Shadow Puppets, the Rascals, The Little Flames or The Jaded Hearts Club.

=== Solo studio albums ===
Title	Album details	Peak chart positions								Certifications
Title	Album details	UK	BEL (FL)	BEL (WA)	NLD	FRA	IRL	SCO	SWI	Certifications
Colour of the Trap	Released: 6 May 2011; Label: Columbia; Format: CD, digital download	11	35	27	61	38	48	7	76	BPI: Gold
Don't Forget Who You Are	Released: 3 June 2013; Label: Columbia; Format: CD, LP, digital download	8	17	44	66	55	29	7	—	
Coup de Grace	Released: 10 August 2018; Label: Virgin EMI; Format: CD, LP, digital	8	20	34	157	113	97	5	70	
Change the Show	Released: 21 January 2022; Label: BMG; Format: CD, LP, digital download	12	132	69	—	141	—	4	—	
One Man Band	Released: 4 August 2023; Label: Modern Sky; Format: CD, LP, digital download	5	12	125	—	—	—	5	—	
Sunlight in the Shadows	Released: 17 October 2025; Label: Easy Eye, Concord; Format: CD, LP, digital download	13	123	—	—	—	—	6	—	
"—" denotes album that did not chart or was not released

=== EPs ===
Title	EP details	Peak chart positions
Title	EP details	UK
Live at iTunes Festival: London 2011	Released: 6 July 2011; Label: Sony Music; Format: Digital download	—N/a
First of My Kind	Released: 20 April 2012; Label: Sony Music; Format: Limited edition vinyl, digital download	65
Give Up	Released: 22 February 2013; Label: Sony Music; Format: 7" vinyl, digital download	62

=== Singles ===
Title	Year	Peak chart positions						Album
Title	Year	UK	BEL (FL)	BEL (WA)	FRA	MEX	SCO	Album
"Inhaler"	2010	171	—	—	—	—	—	Colour of the Trap
"Come Closer"	2011	85	—	73	75	50	82	Colour of the Trap
"Rearrange"	2011	149	53	79	—	—	—	Colour of the Trap
"First of My Kind"	2012	65	80	—	—	—	53	First of My Kind EP
"Give Up"	2013	62	95	—	—	—	50	Don't Forget Who You Are
"Don't Forget Who You Are"	2013	158	64	86	—	—	—	Don't Forget Who You Are
"Taking Over"	2013	—	95	—	—	—	—	Don't Forget Who You Are
"Better Than That"	2013	—	79	—	—	—	—	Don't Forget Who You Are
"Are You Getting Enough?" (Professor Green featuring Kane)	2014	93	112	—	—	—	—	Growing Up in Public (deluxe version)
"Loaded"	2018	—	—	—	—	—	—	Coup de Grace
"Cry On My Guitar"	2018	—	68	—	—	—	93	Coup de Grace
"Killing the Joke"	2018	—	—	—	—	—	—	Coup de Grace
"LA Five Four (309)"	2018	—	—	—	—	—	—	Non-album singles
"Coup de Grace" (CamelPhat remix)	2019	—	95	—	—	—	—	Non-album singles
"Can You See Me Now"	2019	—	—	—	—	—	—	Non-album singles
"Blame It on the Summertime"	2019	—	—	—	—	—	—	Non-album singles
"Troubled Son"	2023	—	—	—	—	—	—	One Man Band
"—" denotes single that did not chart or was not released

=== Other contributions ===
Year	Release	Artist	Details
2007	Favourite Worst Nightmare	Arctic Monkeys	Guitar on "505"
2011	"Little Illusion Machine (Wirral Riddler)"	Miles Kane and the Death Ramps	Vocals; B-side of "The Hellcat Spangled Shalalala" by Arctic Monkeys
2011	Hotel Shampoo	Gruff Rhys	Guitar on "Space Dust #2"
2015	Mortdecai (Original Motion Picture Soundtrack)	Geoff Zanelli & Mark Ronson	Vocals on "Johanna"
2020	Blossoms in Isolation	Blossoms	Vocals on "The Less I Know the Better" (cover of Tame Impala)
2021	Blue Banisters	Lana Del Rey	Vocals, co-writer on "Dealer"
2021	11 Past the Hour	Imelda May	Vocals on "What We Did in the Dark"
2022	Walk Another Mile	The Lightning Seeds	Backing vocals
2023	Undo The Blue	Iraina Mancini	Guitar
