= Inhaler (Miles Kane song) =

Single by Miles Kane

from the album Colour of the Trap
- B-side: "Rainbow Woman"; "Hey Bulldog"
- Released: 19 November 2010
- Recorded: 2010
- Genre: Acid rock; garage rock; indie rock
- Length: 3:06
- Label: Sony Music Entertainment
- Songwriters: Sean Bonniwell, Miles Kane
- Producer: Dan Carey

Miles Kane singles chronology
"Inhaler" (2010)	"Come Closer" (2011)

Music video
- "Inhaler" on YouTube

"Inhaler" is the debut solo single by English musician Miles Kane, released on 19 November 2010. It was released as a limited run on 7" vinyl and as a digital download on iTunes. The song was re-released on 8 July 2011. Matt Collar of AllMusic described the song as "bluesy acid garage." Joe Zadeh of Clash commented that the song is "brilliantly executed, explosive indie rock." The song is based on a riff borrowed from "Mother Nature, Father Earth", a song by the 1960s garage rock band the Music Machine.

== Music video ==
A music video to accompany the release of "Inhaler" was uploaded onto YouTube on 9 June 2011 at a total length of three minutes and three seconds.

== Covers ==
Cee Lo Green covered the song on the BBC Live Lounge on 1 October 2011.

== Track listing ==
Digital download #1
No.	Title	Length
1.	"Inhaler" (Miles Kane/Sean Bonniwell)	3:06
2.	"Rainbow Woman" (Lee Hazlewood) (Lee Hazlewood cover)	2:46

Digital download #2
No.	Title	Length
1.	"Inhaler"	3:03
2.	"Hey Bulldog" (Live At Manchester Academy)	3:14

Mother Nature Father Earth
Sample of "Mother Nature Father Earth", a 1969 song by the psychedelic garage rock band The Music Machine which the riff is borrowed from.

== Charts ==
The single reached #171 on the UK Singles Chart. It also peaked #10 in the NME Singles Charts on 4 December 2010.

Chart (2010)	Peak position
UK Singles (The Official Charts Company)	171

== Release history ==
Region	Date	Format	Label
United Kingdom	19 November 2010	Digital download	Sony Music Entertainment
United Kingdom	8 July 2011	Digital download	Sony Music Entertainment
