= Rascalize =

Studio album by The Rascals
- Released: 15 June 2008 on iTunes; 23 June 2008
- Recorded: London
- Length: 37:27
- Label: Deltasonic
- Producer: Ben Hillier

Singles from Rascalize
- 1. "Freakbeat Phantom" Released: 16 June 2008; 2. "I'll Give You Sympathy" Released: 29 September 2008

Professional ratings
Aggregate scores
Source	Rating
Metacritic	48/100
Review scores
Source	Rating
Allmusic	2.5/5 stars
The Fly	4/5 stars
Mojo	2/5 stars
NME	(6/10)
Q	3/5 stars
The Times	3/5 stars
The Guardian	2/5 stars
Uncut	2/5 stars

Rascalize is the debut album by rock band The Rascals. Recorded with producer Ben Hillier (The Horrors, Blur, Elbow) in London, released through Deltasonic.

The album was released on 23 June 2008 (first released on iTunes on 15 June 2008). It debuted and peaked at No. 100 on the UK Albums Chart dropping out of the charts the following week.

== Singles ==
- "Freakbeat Phantom" (16 June 2008, Deltasonic)
- "I'll Give You Sympathy" (29 September 2008, Deltasonic)

== Track listing ==
All music is composed by The Rascals.

No.	Title	Length
1.	"Rascalize"	2:27
2.	"Out of Dreams"	3:10
3.	"Bond Girl"	2:31
4.	"The Glorified Collector"	2:55
5.	"Fear Invicted Into the Perfect Stranger"	4:08
6.	"Does Your Husband Know That You're on the Run?"	3:51
7.	"I'd Be Lying to You"	3:00
8.	"Freakbeat Phantom"	3:30
9.	"People Watching"	2:24
10.	"Stockings to Suit"	3:03
11.	"How Do I End This?"	3:03
12.	"I'll Give You Sympathy"	3:25
13.	"Ratcatcher (Japan Bonus)"	2:37
14.	"Is It Too Late? (Japan Bonus)"	4:12

== Personnel ==
- Miles Kane – vocals, guitar
- Greg Mighall – drums
- Joe Edwards – bass
- Ben Hillier – producer

== Charts ==
Chart (2008)	Peak position
UK Albums Chart	100
