= Colour of the Trap =

Studio album by Miles Kane
- Released: 6 May 2011
- Recorded: 2010–2011
- Studio: Metropolis Studios; RAK Studios; Miloco Garden; Konk; Mr Dan's
- Genre: Indie rock; alternative rock
- Length: 38:57
- Label: Columbia
- Producer: Dan Carey; Dan the Automator; Craig Silvey; Gruff Rhys

Miles Kane chronology
Colour of the Trap (2011)	First of My Kind (2012)

Singles from Colour of the Trap
- 1. "Inhaler" Released: 19 November 2010; 2. "Come Closer" Released: 18 February 2011; 3. "Rearrange" Released: 25 March 2011

Colour of the Trap is the debut solo album by English musician Miles Kane, released on 6 May 2011 by Columbia Records. It was mainly written by Kane and frequent collaborator Alex Turner alongside Gruff Rhys and Sean Bonniwell. It was produced in London by Rhys, Dan Carey, Dan the Automator and Craig Silvey. The record features guest musicians Clémence Poésy on the track "Happenstance" and Noel Gallagher on "My Fantasy". The cover features a black and white picture of Kane, taken by Laurence Ellis, with his name superimposed in light purple. The album peaked to number 11 on the UK Albums Chart.

== Critical reception ==
Professional ratings
Aggregate scores
Source	Rating
Metacritic	73/100
Review scores
Source	Rating
NME	7/10
BBC	(mixed)
The Guardian	3/5 stars
Q Magazine	8/10
Scotsman.com	(mixed)
Virgin Media	3/5 stars
Hackskeptic	7/10 stars
411mania.com	8/10 stars
All Noise	7/10 stars

The album received generally positive reviews. At Metacritic, which assigns a normalised rating out of 100 to reviews from mainstream critics, the album received an average score of 73, based on 15 reviews. All-noise said "Colour of the Trap is a promising and entertaining first solo effort, if he can get the mix of attention-grabbing chart fodder and deeper, engaging album tracks right then you get the feeling Miles Kane might just become unstoppable", while Scotsman.com said "He has the tunes, but occasionally sounds strained with the effort of being hip and popular. The retro hang-ups get in the way of something undeniably modern. Colour of the Trap is one of the few to escape that syndrome." Jamie Crossman from NME said "'Colour of the Trap' isn’t quite a perfect debut, but by stepping out from the shadows, Miles Kane has come away smelling of roses."

== Singles ==
Three singles were released from the album. "Inhaler" was the first singled to be released, peaking at number 171 on the UK singles chart. "Come Closer" was the second single to be released from the album, reaching 85 on the UK singles chart. "Rearrange", the album's third and as yet final single, peaked to number 149 on the UK singles chart.

== Track listing ==
No.	Title	Writer(s)	Length
1.	"Come Closer"	Kane	2:59
2.	"Rearrange"	Kane, Alex Turner	3:29
3.	"My Fantasy"	Kane	3:20
4.	"Counting Down the Days"	Kane, Alex Turner	3:21
5.	"Happenstance"	Kane, Alex Turner	3:04
6.	"Quicksand"	Kane, Gruff Rhys	3:19
7.	"Inhaler"	Kane, Sean Bonniwell	3:03
8.	"Kingcrawler"	Kane	3:37
9.	"Take the Night From Me"	Kane	2:55
10.	"Telepathy"	Kane, Alex Turner	3:07
11.	"Better Left Invisible"	Kane, Alex Turner	3:20
12.	"Colour of the Trap"	Kane, Alex Turner, Andy Sweeney	3:28
Total length:			38:57

Japanese iTunes Bonus Tracks
No.	Title	Length
13.	"Rainbow Woman"	2:42
14.	"Before It's Midnight"	2:59
15.	"Morning Comes"	3:47

iTunes bonus tracks
No.	Title	Length
13.	"Come Closer" (Live at RAK video)	2:55
14.	"Rearrange" (Live at RAK video)	3:31
15.	"Quicksand" (Live at RAK video)	3:16
16.	"Kingcrawler" (Live at RAK video)	4:30
17.	"My Fantasy" (Live at RAK video)	3:29
Total length:		54:03

== Charts ==
Chart (2011)	Peak Position
Belgian Albums Chart (Flanders)	35
Belgian Albums Chart (Wallonia)	27
Dutch Albums Chart	61
French Albums Chart	38
Swiss Albums Chart	76
UK Albums Chart	11
UK Album Download Chart	7
Scottish Album Chart	7

=== Certifications ===
Region	Certification	Certified units/sales
United Kingdom (BPI)	Gold	100,000^{^}
^{^} Shipments figures based on certification alone.

== Release history ==
Country	Date	Format	Label
United Kingdom	6 May 2011	Digital download	Columbia Records
United Kingdom	9 May 2011	CD	Columbia Records

== Personnel ==
Credits adapted from Colour of the Trap liner notes.

- Miles Kane – vocals, guitar
- Dan Carey – bass, keyboards
- Leo Taylor – drums
- Gruff Rhys – backing vocals (1, 2, 4, 8), bass (8)
- Lianne Barnes – backing vocals (1, 2, 11, 12)
- Chris Walmsley – drums (3, 8, 9)
- Ben Parsons – keyboards (8)
- Eugene McGuinness – backing vocals, guitar (6)
- Noel Gallagher – backing vocals (3)
- Clémence Poésy – vocals (4)
- Antonia Pagulatos – violin (3, 12)
- Oli Langford – violin (3, 12)
- Mike Pagulatos – viola (3, 12)
- Isabelle Dunn – cello (3, 12)
- Phillip Anderson – bass (6)
- Andrew Waterworth – double bass (9)
- Osian Gwynedd – piano (9)

Production

- Dan Carey – production (1–5, 7, 10–12)
- Gruff Rhys – production (8, 9)
- Craig Sylvey – production (6, 8, 9), backing vocal recording (6)
