= Steven Evanne Heinstein =

American composer, musician

- Origin: United States
- Genres: Pop, Eclectic, Ambient, Electronic
- Occupation(s): Composer, Musician
- Instrument(s): Piano, Drums, Guitar, Bass Guitar, Vocals, Programming
- Website: stevenevanneheinstein.com

Steven Evanne Heinstein is an American songwriter, producer, composer, and music executive.

== Life and career ==
A multi-instrumentalist, Heinstein studied Music Performance at USC Thornton School of Music and Creative Writing and Poetry at Emerson College. His early songwriting career included writing and producing for The Voice (American TV series) and American Idol contestants, before working with major label artists.

Known for having an eclectic pop style, Heinstein has written, performed, and produced songs with a diverse group of artists, including Érica García, Beth Hirsch, Max Graham, French Montana, and Darius Campbell. His songs have been recorded by artists in the United Kingdom, Australia, North America, South America, and Europe. He has also appeared on soundtracks with Katy Perry and Adele.

Heinstein's songs have appeared in the films When in Rome, El Cantante, Bad Teacher, and Mr. Fixit. His music has been featured in more than fifty television series including: Lucifer (TV series), Power (TV series), Black-ish, Nashville (2012 TV series), Ray Donovan, Smash The Gates, Army Wives, and Melrose Place.

He has scored art installations and video games for Electronic Arts, Funcom, Hasbro, 505 Games, and Pileated Pictures including beats for Jay-Z's Empire.

Heinstein's compositions are included in advertising spots worldwide for Media Storm, L'enchanteur, Viacom, Adidas, Volkswagen, iNDELIBLE, and TBWA\Chiat\Day.

In 2015, Heinstein turned to music publishing with artist placements and synchronization. In 2020, he launched Xtraordinary Songs, a music publishing and management company. 2021 saw the debut release of songs by major label artists under Xtraordinary Songs.

== The Fox Must Pay ==
Alongside Brandi Emma and Thomas Schobel, Heinstein was 1/3 of the Los Angeles based The Fox Must Pay. The Fox Must Pay released an EP to critical acclaim yet did not chart commercially. Championed by KCRW and Sony, the band made Kevin Bronson's buzzband.la, featured in an Adidas commercial, and remixed by a host of international DJs.
