= Delicatessen (band) =

English indie-rock group

Delicatessen were an English indie rock group formed in Leicester in the early 1990s. They released three albums and four singles before splitting in 1998. They were associated with the Britpop era.

== Biography ==
Delicatessen was formed by Neil Carlill (vocals, guitar), Craig Bown (guitar, flute), Pete Capewell (bass) and Stuart Dayman (drums), taking their name from the French film. Signing to Starfish records, they debuted in October 1994 with the single "Inviting Both Sisters To Dinner", followed by "C.F. Kane" in April 1995. Debut album Skin Touching Water was released a month later. They headlined the little tent at Reading that summer, with Jonny Wood added on keyboards, percussion, backing vocals, and violin from then on. Capewell had already left, replaced by Will Foster. The second album Hustle into Bed, a dark, piano/string led album, was issued in 1996, produced by longtime Nick Cave/Bad Seeds/Birthday Party engineer Tony Cohen. The band reappeared in early 1998, with a third album There's No Confusing Some People on Viper Records. After two token gigs, the band split, Carlill and Foster joining members of Supergrass and Powder in indie supergroup Lodger.

Delicatessen recorded two sessions for John Peel's BBC Radio 1 show, both in 1995. The first was a four track studio session and the second six tracks recorded at the Reading Festival.

Will Foster now plays keyboards in The Tears. Neil Carlill is making music in the United States, with Vedette, Me Me the Moth & Chicanery. Stuart Dayman is a photographer. Pete Capewell has become a maths teacher. Jonny Wood played keyboards with Ten Benson, and bass and violin with early Poptones band January.

== Discography ==
=== Singles ===
- "Inviting Both Sisters to Dinner" (1994, Starfish)
- "C.F. Kane" (1995, Starfish)
- "I'm Just Alive" (1995, Starfish)
- "Monkey Suit" (1996, Starfish)

=== Albums ===
- Skin Touching Water (1995, Starfish)
- Hustle into Bed (1996, Starfish)
- There's No Confusing Some People (1998, Viper)
