= Pearl Lowe =

English singer-songwriter, fashion and textiles designer (born 1970)

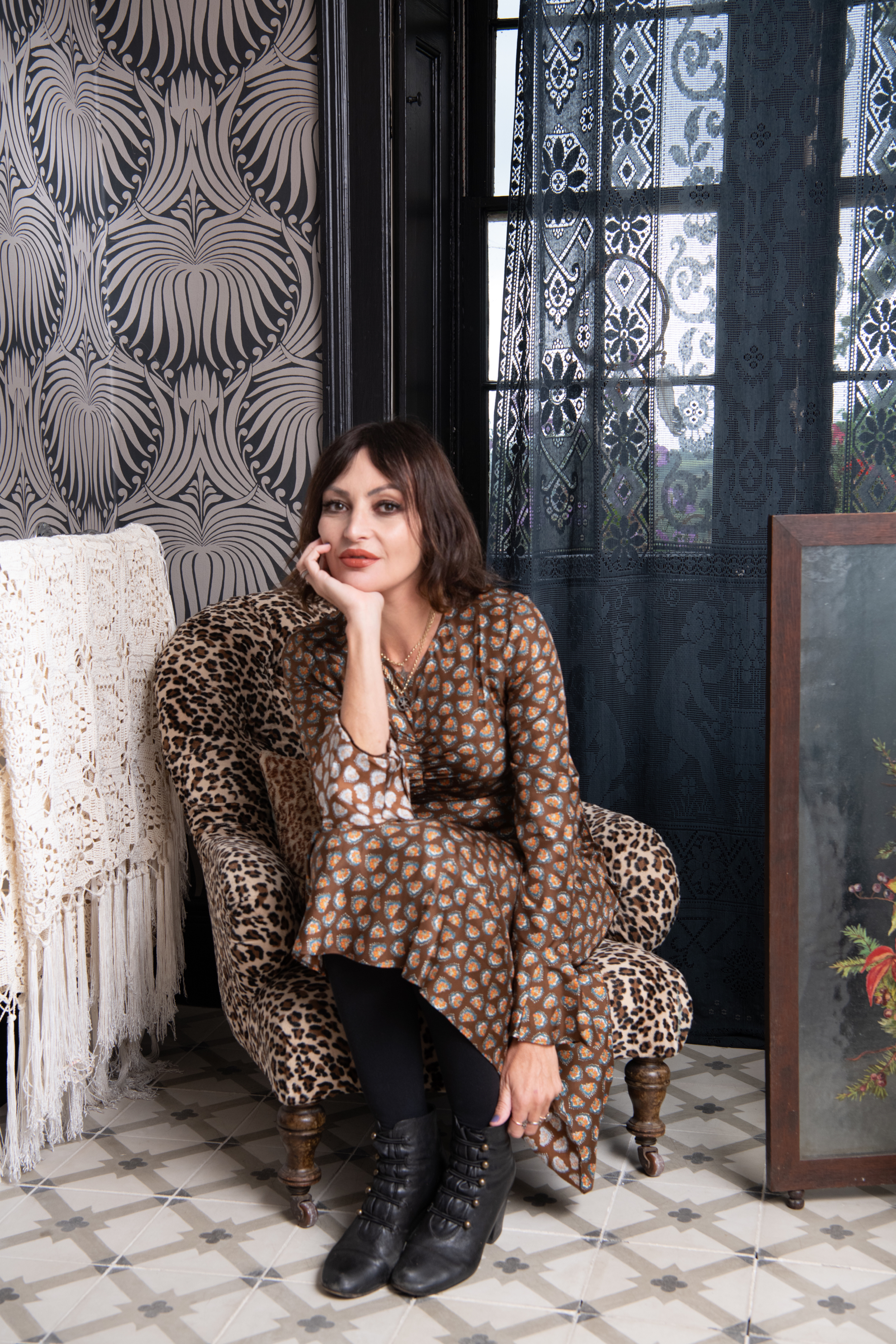
- Lowe photographed at home in Somerset (2023)
- Born: Pearl Samantha Lowe; 7 April 1970 (age 56); London, England
- Label: Pearl Lowe
- Spouse: Danny Goffey (m. 2008)
- Children: 4, including Daisy Lowe

Pearl Lowe (born Pearl Samantha Lowe; 7 April 1970) is an English fashion and textiles designer and former singer-songwriter.

== Career ==
=== Music ===
Lowe was the vocalist of mid-1990s indie bands Powder and Lodger, which she fronted after a brief period at LAMDA, and as a solo-artist under the name Pearl.

=== Textile and interior design ===
Lowe is known for her love of vintage interiors and fashion. In 2001, she launched 'Pearl Lowe', her signature range of lace curtains and cushions. In 2006, Lowe moved to Somerset where she began designing her own bespoke handmade dresses and childrenswear that were sold to Liberty and The Cross in London. She has also designed capsule ranges for the High Street retailer, Peacocks. Alongside her textiles work, Lowe also designed interiors for many private clients.

In 2017, she launched a collection of bespoke dresses for women through the Pearl Lowe website. Lowe's womenswear collection follows on from the Petite Pearl Lowe luxury dress up collection of vintage inspired costumes. The range is circus inspired and is aimed at young girls and sold through retailers, Harrods and Selfridges.

=== Media ===
Lowe published her memoir All That Glitters in 2007, a sombre look at overcoming addiction. In 2013, she launched her first interiors book, entitled Pearl Lowe’s Vintage Craft, which saw her bring her styling advice to a much wider audience.

Lowe has contributed to TV Programmes, design columns and blogs. She has also appeared on Britain's Next Top Model and more recently in Channel 4's Four Rooms.

She was briefly the face of Agent Provocateur. Lowe was an ambassador for the homeless charity Crisis, and is now an ambassador for Action on Addiction.

== Personal life ==
Lowe's mother Leila is an interior designer. She was named after her maternal grandmother Pearl Teller, who died on the day she was born. Lowe's father Eddie died in 2016 of lung cancer.

She has a daughter, Daisy Lowe (b. 27 January 1989), with singer Gavin Rossdale. Daisy is a fashion model who also worked for Agent Provocateur.

Since 1995, her partner has been Supergrass drummer Danny Goffey, with whom she has three children: Alfie (b. 9 October 1996), Frankie (b. 17 May 1998), and Betty (b. 2005). Goffey and Lowe married on 4 December 2008 in Babington House, Somerset. Lowe and her family live in Frome, Somerset, after residing in north London for many years.

Charities which Lowe supports include Action On Addiction, the NSPCC and Shelter.

== Bibliography ==
- Lowe, Pearl (2007). All That Glitters. Hodder & Stoughton. ISBN 978-0-340-93319-0.
- Lowe, Pearl (2013). Pearl Lowe's Vintage Craft: 50 Craft Projects and Home Styling Advice. HarperCollins. ISBN 9780007491094.
- Faded Glamour. Ryland Peters and small. 2019.
- Faded Glamour by the sea. Ryland Peters and small. 2022.
