= Powder (British band) =

1990s Britpop band

- Origin: London, England
- Genre: Britpop
- Years active: 1994–1996
- Label: Parkway Records
- Past members: Pearl Lowe; Mark Thomas; Tim McTighe; James Walden

Powder were a Britpop band that existed between 1994 and 1996 and released three singles on Parkway Records. They were fronted by Pearl Lowe, with songwriters Mark Thomas on guitar and Tim McTighe on bass and James Walden on drums. Their highest-charting single, "Afrodisiac", reached No. 72 on the UK Singles Chart.

== Career ==
Signed in late 1994 by music public relations agents John Best and Jane Savidge, they were the first band on the label. Their first single, "20th Century Gods", a Select Single Of The Month, sold out of its pressing of 1,500 within two days. This was followed by the release of "Afrodisiac" in June 1995, and appearances at music festivals as well as prime-time BBC music special Britpop Now.

== Breakup and aftermath ==
After the release of their third and last single, "Deep Fried", in November 1995, Powder stopped touring as Lowe was pregnant. By the time she was ready to tour again the band was finished, having announced their split in spring 1996, citing musical differences between Lowe and Thomas. Posthumous album MCMXCV, a compilation of all the tracks from their three singles, was released in Japan in 1997.

Lowe went on to front Lodger, and has also released a solo album. Thomas was later a member of the hard rock band Black Spiders. Walden now drums for the psychedelic/rock three-piece The Joydanaires.

== Discography ==
=== Singles ===
- "20th Century Gods" / "Dizgo Girl" (Parkway Records 1995)
- "Afrodisiac" / "Shave Me" / "Fever" (Parkway Records 1995 - track 3 CD only) - UK No. 72
- "Deep Fried" / "Memo From Turner" / "Sold Out" (Parkway Records 1995) - UK No. 82

=== Compilation album ===
- MCMXCV (Parkway Records 1997)
