= Verizon VIP Tour =

Former annual concert tour (2007–2009)

The Verizon VIP Tour was an annual concert tour promoted by Live Nation Global Touring and Verizon Wireless. Following in the footsteps of the Verizon Ladies First Tour, the VIP Tour features an emerging female artist as the headliner. The concerts are exclusive to Verizon Wireless customers (although select concerts are open to the public), following an appearance by the headliner at a local Verizon Wireless store. The tour predominantly takes place in the United States. The concert series ran from 2007 to 2009.

== Fergie (2007) ==
Verizon VIP Tour
- National tour by Fergie
- Location: U.S., North America
- Associated album: The Dutchess
- Start date: May 8, 2007
- End date: July 28, 2007
- Legs: 1
- No. of shows: 23 in North America

American singer-songwriter Fergie headlined the inaugural Verizon VIP Tour. The tour supported her debut album, The Dutchess.

=== Set list ===
1. "Here I Come"
2. "London Bridge"
3. "Clumsy"
4. "Big Girls Don't Cry"
5. "Don't Lie" / "Hey Mama" / "Shut Up" / "Don't Phunk with My Heart" / "Where Is the Love"
6. "Pedestal"
7. "All That I Got (The Make Up Song)"
8. "My Humps"
9. "Voodoo Doll"
10. "Mary Jane Shoes"
11. "Barracuda"

Encore

12. "Rehab"
13. "Glamorous"
14. "Fergalicious"
15. "Finally"

=== Tour dates ===
Date	City	Country	Venue	Opening Acts
North America
May 8, 2007	Seattle	United States	Franklin High School Gym	Rooney; Ludacris
May 21, 2007	Pittsburgh	United States	Byham Theater	Rooney; Ludacris
May 22, 2007	Indianapolis	United States	Egyptian Room	Rooney; Ludacris
May 23, 2007	Cleveland	United States	House of Blues	Rooney; Ludacris
May 26, 2007	Atlantic City	United States	House of Blues	Rooney; Ludacris
May 28, 2007	Philadelphia	United States	Franklin Music Hall	Rooney; Ludacris
May 31, 2007	Boca Raton	United States	Mizner Park Amphitheatre	Rooney; Ludacris
June 1, 2007	Clearwater	United States	Ruth Eckerd Hall	Rooney; Ludacris
June 2, 2007	Atlanta	United States	The Tabernacle	Rooney; Ludacris
June 5, 2007	Houston	United States	Verizon Wireless Theater	Rooney; Ludacris
June 6, 2007	Dallas	United States	House of Blues	Rooney; Ludacris
June 10, 2007	Chicago	United States	House of Blues	Rooney; Ludacris
June 11, 2007	St. Louis	United States	The Pageant Concert NightClub	Rooney; Ludacris
June 13, 2007	Detroit	United States	State Theatre	Rooney; Ludacris
June 19, 2007	Boston	United States	Avalon	Rooney; Ludacris
June 21, 2007	New York City	United States	Roseland Ballroom	Rooney; Ludacris
July 17, 2007	Anaheim	United States	House of Blues	Rooney; Ludacris
July 18, 2007	Los Angeles	United States	Wiltern Theatre	Rooney; Ludacris
July 19, 2007	Phoenix	United States	Dodge Theatre	Rooney; Ludacris
July 22, 2007	Denver	United States	Fillmore Auditorium	Rooney; Ludacris
July 24, 2007	Portland	United States	Crystal Ballroom	Rooney; Ludacris
July 27, 2007	Stateline	United States	Harvey's Outdoor Amphitheater	Rooney; Ludacris
July 28, 2007	Las Vegas	United States	Pearl Concert Theater	Rooney; Ludacris

=== Box office score data ===
Venue	City	Tickets sold / available	Gross revenue
Mizner Park Amphitheatre	Boca Raton	3,220/ 3,220 (100%)	$165,464
Harvey's Outdoor Amphitheater	Stateline	5,920 / 5,920 (100%)	$302,634

== Natasha Bedingfield (2008) ==
Verizon VIP Tour
- National tour by Natasha Bedingfield
- Location: U.S., North America
- Associated album: Pocketful of Sunshine
- Start date: May 21, 2008
- End date: July 10, 2008
- Legs: 1
- No. of shows: 23 in North America

Natasha Bedingfield concert chronology
- Verizon VIP Tour (2008); Less Is More Tour (2011)

British singer-songwriter Natasha Bedingfield headlined the 2008 Verizon VIP Tour. The tour supported the reissue of her second studio album, Pocketful of Sunshine.

=== Opening acts ===
- Kate Voegele (select venues)
- The Veronicas (select venues)

=== Setlist ===
1. "Piece of Your Heart"
2. "Who Knows"
3. "Pocketful of Sunshine
4. "These Words"
5. "Soulmate""
6. "Pirate Bones"
7. "Ray of Light
8. "Love like This"
9. "Say It Again"
10. "Freckles" (acoustic version)
11. "Single" (acoustic version)
12. "Put Your Arms Around Me"
13. "Angel"
14. "Backyard"
15. "Unwritten"

=== Tour dates ===
Date	City	Country	Venue
North America
May 21, 2008	North Myrtle Beach	United States	House of Blues
May 23, 2008	Lake Buena Vista	United States	House of Blues
May 24, 2008	Clearwater	United States	Ruth Eckerd Hall
May 27, 2008	Atlanta	United States	Variety Playhouse
June 2, 2008	Cleveland	United States	House of Blues
June 3, 2008	Indianapolis	United States	Egyptian Room
June 4, 2008	Detroit	United States	Saint Andrew's Hall
June 5, 2008	Cincinnati	United States	Bogart's
June 8, 2008	St. Louis	United States	The Pageant Concert NightClub
June 10, 2008	Dallas	United States	House of Blues
June 11, 2008	Houston	United States	Verizon Wireless Theater
June 12, 2008	New Orleans	United States	House of Blues
June 16, 2008	Philadelphia	United States	The Fillmore at the TLA
June 17, 2008	Baltimore	United States	Rams Head Live!
June 20, 2008	Atlantic City	United States	Borgata Music Box
June 24, 2008	Boston	United States	Paradise Rock Club
June 25, 2008	New York City	United States	The Fillmore at Irving Plaza
June 30, 2008	Englewood	United States	Gothic Theatre
July 2, 2008	Las Vegas	United States	House of Blues
July 5, 2008	San Diego	United States	House of Blues
July 7, 2008	Anaheim	United States	House of Blues
July 9, 2008	West Hollywood	United States	House of Blues
July 10, 2008	San Francisco	United States	The Fillmore

=== Box office score data ===
Venue	City	Tickets sold / available	Gross revenue
House of Blues	Myrtle Beach	1,079 / 2,067 (52%)	$15,790
House of Blues	Lake Buena Vista	1,518 / 1,518 (100%)	$24,845
Ruth Eckerd Hall	Clearwater	770 / 1,875 (41%)	$31,013
House of Blues	Cleveland	600 / 600 (100%)	$12,000
Egyptian Room	Indianapolis	934 / 2,000 (47%)	$9,179
Bogart's	Cincinnati	775 / 1,500 (52%)	$10,788
House of Blues	New Orleans	1,000 / 1,000 (100%)	$26,500
The Fillmore at the TLA	Philadelphia	627 / 1,000 (63%)	$12,400
Paradise Rock Club	Boston	653 / 653 (100%)	$10,553
The Fillmore at Irving Plaza	New York City	867 / 1,114 (78%)	$13,890
Gothic Theatre	Englewood	600 / 1,000 (60%)	$12,500
House of Blues	Las Vegas	900 / 900 (100%)	$19,004
House of Blues	San Diego	500 / 500 (100%)	$10,821
House of Blues	Anaheim	550 / 1,100 (50%)	$9,665
House of Blues	West Hollywood	550 / 550 (100%)	$12,670
The Fillmore	San Francisco	816 / 1,187 (69%)	$12,879
TOTAL		12,739 / 18,564 (70%)	$244,497

== Bow Wow as Shad Moss (2008) ==
American rapper Bow Wow was slated to headline a series of concerts in the Fall of 2008. The tour was later canceled without explanation.

== Keith Urban (2009) ==
Verizon VIP Tour
- Nacional tour by Keith Urban
- Location: U.S., North America
- Associated album: Defying Gravity
- Start date: March 18, 2009
- End date: April 3, 2009
- Legs: 1
- No. of shows: 6 in North America

Keith Urban concert chronology
- Love, Pain & the Whole Crazy World Tour (2007–08); Verizon VIP Tour (2009); Escape Together World Tour (2009)

Australian country singer Keith Urban headlined the concert series in 2009. Unlike previous outings, the tour was very limited, with only six tour dates—as Urban was preparing for his upcoming, "Escape Together World Tour". He serves as the first male performer for the concert series. Urban described the outing as:

"Clubs are where it all began. There's just something about the way the band grooves and how the audience gets right up there close and personal, and I love it. So for me there's a nostalgic cool factor in doing this with Verizon."

The tour was also recognized as the No Frills Tour

=== Setlist ===
1. "Days Go By"
2. "You're My Better Half"^{1}
3. "Stupid Boy"
4. "I Told You So"
5. "'Til Summer Comes Around"
6. "Kiss a Girl"
7. "Making Memories of Us"
8. "Only You Can Love Me This Way"
9. "Sweet Thing"
10. "You Look Good in My Shirt"
11. "Raining on Sunday"
12. "You'll Think of Me"^{1}
13. "Who Wouldn't Wanna Be Me"
14. "Somebody Like You"

Encore

1. "Tonight I Wanna Cry"^{1}
2. "Better Life"^{1}

^{1}Performed at select dates

==== Additional notes ====
- "Once in a Lifetime" was included at the performances at the House of Blues in Dallas, Texas and the Theatre of the Living Arts in Philadelphia, Pennsylvania.
- "You'll Think of Me" was not included at the performances at the Theatre of the Living Arts in Philadelphia, Pennsylvania.
- "You're My Better Half" was not included in the performance at the House of Blues in Los Angeles, California. At the same performance, "I Told You So" was not performed as well.
- "Where the Blacktop Ends" was performed at the House of Blues in Los Angeles, California; the Webster Hall in New York City and the Theatre for the Living Arts in Philadelphia, Pennsylvania
- "Who Wouldn't Wanna Be Me" was not included at the performance at the Webster Hall in New York City.
- "Better Life" was not performed at Joe's Bar on Weed St. in Chicago, Illinois.
- "Tonight I Wanna Cry" was not included at the performance at the Webster Hall in New York City.

=== Tour dates ===
Date	City	Country	Venue
North America
March 18, 2009	Dallas	United States	House of Blues
March 24, 2009	San Francisco	United States	The Fillmore
March 27, 2009	West Hollywood	United States	House of Blues
March 30, 2009	Chicago	United States	Joe's Bar on Weed St.
April 1, 2009	New York City	United States	Webster Hall
April 3, 2009	Philadelphia	United States	Theater of the Living Arts
