= Clumsy (Fergie song) =

2007 single by Fergie

Single by Fergie

from the album The Dutchess
- B-side: "Get Your Hands Up"; "Fergalicious"
- Released: September 25, 2007
- Studio: Stewcha (Los Angeles); John Lennon Educational Tour Bus
- Genre: Bubblegum pop
- Length: 4:00
- Label: A&M; will.i.am; Interscope
- Songwriters: Will Adams; Stacy Ferguson; Bobby Troup
- Producer: will.i.am

Fergie singles chronology
"Big Girls Don't Cry" (2007)	"Clumsy" (2007)	"Party People" (2008)

Music video
- "Clumsy" on YouTube

"Clumsy" is a song recorded by American singer Fergie for her debut studio album, The Dutchess (2006). The song was released as the album's fifth single on September 25, 2007. It was written by Fergie and will.i.am, the latter also produced the track, while Bobby Troup receives a songwriting credit due to its sample. It was partially recorded in Los Angeles and in the John Lennon Educational Tour Bus. "Clumsy" is a bubblegum song, and its lyrics about being clumsy and in love flow alongside its computerized and bleeping beat taken from "The Bubble Bunch" by Jimmy Spicer, as well as a sample of "The Girl Can't Help It", originally performed by Little Richard.

The song received generally mixed reviews. Critics praised the Little Richard sample and the goofy lyrics on feelings of love. Some critics deemed it to be the album's highlight and pop at its finest, while others considered it flat. "Clumsy" peaked at number five on the US Billboard Hot 100 chart, becoming Fergie's fifth straight top ten hit in the US. The single was certified platinum by the Recording Industry Association of America and has sold over two million downloads in the country. The song peaked in the top five in Australia, Canada and New Zealand. The song's music video, directed by Marc Webb and Rich Lee, is stylized like a pop-up book and features Swedish model Alex Lundqvist as Fergie's love interest.

== Background ==
"Clumsy" was written by Fergie, Bobby Troup and will.i.am, who produced the song. "Clumsy" was partially recorded at Stewcha Studios in the Los Feliz neighborhood of Los Angeles and in the John Lennon Educational Tour Bus. will.i.am said, "'Clumsy' was recorded in the John Lennon bus [a traveling music education lab], like in a parking lot in Pittsburgh right next to Shakey's. ... To be able to record on the road, that's a task and a half." In an interview with the Associated Press, Fergie stated, "I'm not a promiscuous girl - like I talk about in ”Clumsy”, I'm always the girl with the boyfriend in serious relationships." The song was mixed by Tony Maserati at Record Plant Studios in Los Angeles, California. "Clumsy" was announced as the fifth single from The Dutchess in the United States. In the United Kingdom, the song was released as a double A-side alongside "Fergalicious". An official remix featuring Soulja Boy Tell 'Em was released to digital stores on December 18, 2007.

== Composition ==
"Clumsy"
A sample of "Clumsy", featuring its Casio VL-1 and "The Girl Can't Help It" samples.

The song samples "The Girl Can't Help It" by Little Richard. The song's computerized beeps flow alongside Fergie singing about being clumsy and in love, with the bridge consisting of the lines "You got me trippin', stumblin', flippin', fumblin' / Clumsy cuz I'm fallin in love". According to the sheet music published at Musicnotes.com by Alfred Publishing, "Clumsy" is set in the time signature of common time with a tempo of 92 beats per minute. It is composed in the key of C major with Fergie's vocal range spanning from the note of G_{3} to the note of F_{5}. Daniel Wolfe of About.com commented, "The songstress is “slippin’ and stumblin’” all over a laid-back beat and Casio keyboard lines." The electronic beeps of the melody are sampled from one of the default melodies which came shipped with the Casio VL-1, a portable calculator and digital synthesizer. Alex Fletcher from Digital Spy, commented on its resemblance to Tweet's 2002 single "Oops (Oh My)". He went on to say that he was not impressed with "Clumsy", writing that it is "a proper stinker" and "[f]latter than a pancake that's been sat on by the cast of Celebrity Fit Club."

== Music video ==
The music video for "Clumsy" was directed by Marc Webb and Rich Lee in Los Angeles. MTV spoke of the clip, saying, "The surreal, humorous clip features Fergie falling head over heels — get it? — for love in various scenarios." Most scenes in the video were shot using a green screen. Swedish model Alex Lundqvist portrays Fergie's love interest in the video. Lundqvist spoke of the experience with the Swedish magazine Aftonbladet, saying that "it was really fun" and that "Fergie is so sympathetic and cool". The video premiered on October 12, 2007, on AOL Music.

On a space shuttle, Fergie accidentally presses the airlock button (top), causing her love interest to get sucked out in space (bottom).

The video is done in the style of a pop-up book. It begins with the book opening, displaying the directors' names, the artist and the title. Fergie begins to sing and the page flips to reveal a pop-up concert, featuring Fergie with a beehive hairstyle, a pink dress, and black Opera gloves, followed by a pop-up of a DSquared² fashion show where Fergie is attracted to a man (Alex Lundqvist) in the audience. Another page flip reveals Fergie in a car, and she sees the man again. She then shows off with the car, but it breaks down and the man leaves. During the song's middle eight, she is singing in a pop-up space shuttle and at the same time at the concert, she knocks down a dancer and the stage begins to collapse. While in the shuttle, she accidentally presses the airlock button, which sucks the man out into space, killing him. After this, Fergie is shown in a plane, flying around a pop-up world. To conclude the video, Fergie is getting ready on a rooftop photo shoot and she sits down on a ledge to read a text message, and she falls off the building and the man catches her. They walk off toward a sunset and the book closes.

Rap-Up deemed the video to have a "cool concept". Tamar Anitai of MTV Buzzworthy wrote that the video "is basically an amalgam of many things we find hard to resist: Amy Winehouse-style retro-nuevo beehives, free falling, fake planes, cheesy acting, En Vogue-era little black dresses, old-school video games and um, hot dudes, including one who, unsurprisingly, looks like Josh Duhamel." The writer noted that the video's pop-up style was similar to HP's "The Computer is Personal Again" commercials. She concluded saying, "the video is fairly saturated with product placements. As much as we love MAC and DSquared, it's hard to miss those blatant shout outs, as well as the fairly gratuitous Motorola plug."

== Reception ==
Daniel Wolfe of About.com rated "Clumsy" three out of five stars, and wrote that it is "another tasty bubblegum treat from one of pop music's biggest rising stars." He called the song "a good bit of breezy pop fun", but wrote that it "may not be as immediately engaging as her previous hits" and that "there is nothing striking or even slightly epic about the tune." However, he praised the sample of "The Girl Can't Help It", Fergie's "melodious, breathy vocal runs", and the song's goofy lyrics on love. Sal Cinquemani of Slant called the song "crafty, candy-coated pop at its finest". Norman Mayers of Prefix cited "London Bridge" and "Clumsy" as the album's highlights. While reviewing the double A-side featuring "Fergalicious", Azeem Ahmad of MusicOMH wrote that "Clumsy" is "the antidote to the haphazard Fergalicious." Nylon has described the song as bubblegum.

== Commercial performance ==
"Clumsy" debuted at number 91 on the October 27, 2007, chart of the Billboard Hot 100. In its fifth week on the chart, the song was the "greatest digital gainer", and rose from number 20 to number 12. In its ninth week, the song reached its peak of number five, becoming her 5th and last top 10 hit and stayed there for six non-consecutive weeks. The song became the fifth single from Fergie's debut album The Dutchess to reach the top five on the chart, making The Dutchess the first debut album since Milli Vanilli's debut album Girl You Know It's True (1989) to spawn five top five singles. "Clumsy" spent 25 weeks on the Billboard Hot 100 chart, and 12 weeks inside the top ten. The song also reached number two on Pop Songs, and number 89 on Hot R&B/Hip-Hop Songs. "Clumsy" was certified platinum on February 22, 2008, by the Recording Industry Association of America (RIAA). It has sold 2,138,000 paid digital downloads in the United States, becoming Fergie's fifth single to sell two million downloads. "Clumsy" is Fergie's fourth most downloaded song, behind "Big Girls Don't Cry", "Fergalicious" and "Glamorous", and ahead of her first single, "London Bridge".

On the Canadian Hot 100, "Clumsy" debuted at number 79 on the issue dated October 27, 2007. On January 5, 2008, the song reached number four. In Australia, the song debuted at number 120 on the issue dated November 25, 2007. The next week, it peaked to number three, where it stayed for three weeks. The song has been certified gold by the Australian Recording Industry Association (ARIA) for sales of 35,000 units. On the issue dated September 24, 2007, "Clumsy" entered the chart in New Zealand at position 31. On its sixth week on the chart, it reached its peak of number four. The song has been certified gold by the Recording Industry Association of New Zealand (RIANZ) for sales of 7,500 copies.

== Live performances ==
Fergie performed "Clumsy" alongside her previous single "Big Girls Don't Cry" in the 2007 American Music Awards on November 18, 2007. She also performed the song on NBC's The Today Show alongside "Big Girls Don't Cry" and "Barracuda" with part of "Welcome to the Jungle" on May 20, 2008. She performed the song on the Verizon VIP Tour, in which the song's use of "The Girl Can't Help It" sample was reduced.

== Track listing ==
- Digital download
1. "Clumsy" (Radio edit) – 3:21
2. "Clumsy" (Revisited) – 3:30
- Digital EP
1. "Clumsy" – 4:01
2. "Clumsy" (Instrumental) – 4:00
3. "Clumsy" (Revisited) – 3:31
- US Digital EP
1. "Clumsy" (Collipark Remix) (featuring Soulja Boy Tell 'Em) – 3:51
2. "Clumsy" (Pajon Rock Remix) – 3:31
3. "Get Your Hands Up" – 3:34
- UK Fergalicious / Clumsy
1. "Clumsy" – 4:00
2. "Fergalicious" – 4:52
- European maxi-CD single
1. "Clumsy" – 4:01
2. "Clumsy" (Instrumental) – 4:01
3. "Clumsy" (Revisited) – 3:31
4. "Clumsy" (Video) - 4:02

== Personnel ==
Personnel are taken from The Dutchess liner notes.

- Songwriting – William Adams, Stacy Ferguson, Bobby Troup
- Production – will.i.am
- Drum programming – will.i.am
- Engineering – will.i.am, Padraic Kerin
- Mixing – Tony Maserati

== Charts ==
=== Weekly charts ===
Chart (2007–2008)	Peak position
Australia (ARIA)	3
Australian Urban (ARIA)	2
Austria (Ö3 Austria Top 40)	53
Belgium (Ultratip Bubbling Under Flanders)	2
Belgium (Ultratip Bubbling Under Wallonia)	16
Canada Hot 100 (Billboard)	4
Czech Republic Airplay (ČNS IFPI)	12
Denmark (Tracklisten)	34
Germany (GfK)	50
Hungary (Editors' Choice Top 40)	28
Ireland (IRMA)	17
Mexico (Top 20 – Inglés)	7
Netherlands (Dutch Top 40 Tipparade)	4
Netherlands (Single Top 100)	84
New Zealand (Recorded Music NZ)	4
Romania (Romanian Top 100)	35
Slovakia Airplay (ČNS IFPI)	14
Sweden (Sverigetopplistan)	15
UK Singles (Official Charts)	62
US Billboard Hot 100	5
US Adult Pop Airplay (Billboard)	20
US Hot Latin Songs (Billboard)	48
US Hot R&B/Hip-Hop Songs (Billboard)	89
US Pop Airplay (Billboard)	2
US Rhythmic Airplay (Billboard)	9

=== Year-end charts ===
Chart (2007)	Position
Australia (ARIA)	52
Australian Urban (ARIA)	12
New Zealand (RIANZ)	49

Chart (2008)	Position
Australia (ARIA)	99
Brazil (Crowley)	28
Canada (Canadian Hot 100)	32
Canada Hot AC (Billboard)	17
US Billboard Hot 100	26
US Mainstream Top 40 (Billboard)	12

== Certifications ==
Region	Certification	Certified units/sales
Australia (ARIA)	2× Platinum	140,000^{^}
Brazil (Pro-Música Brasil) DMS	Platinum	60,000^{*}
Brazil (Pro-Música Brasil)	3× Platinum	180,000^{‡}
New Zealand (RMNZ)	Platinum	30,000^{‡}
United States (RIAA)	2× Platinum	2,000,000^{‡}
United States (RIAA) Mastertone	Platinum	1,000,000^{*}
^{*} Sales figures based on certification alone.^{^} Shipments figures based on certification alone.^{‡} Sales+streaming figures based on certification alone.

== Release history ==
Release dates and formats for "Clumsy"
Region	Date	Version(s)	Format(s)	Label(s)	Ref.
United States	September 25, 2007	Original	Contemporary hit radio; digital download (EP); rhythmic contemporary radio	A&M; Interscope; will.i.am	
Australia	November 19, 2007	Original	CD	Universal Music	
Germany	November 23, 2007	Original	Maxi CD	Universal Music	
United States	December 18, 2007	Collipark remix	Digital download (EP)	A&M; Interscope; will.i.am	
