= Here I Come (Fergie song) =

Promotional single by Fergie

from the album The Dutchess
- Released: January 19, 2008
- Studio: John Lennon Educational Tour Bus
- Genre: Hip hop; soul
- Length: 3:21
- Label: A&M; will.i.am
- Songwriter(s): Will Adams; Stacy Ferguson; William Robinson Jr.
- Producer(s): will.i.am

Audio video
- "Here I Come" on YouTube

"Here I Come" is a song recorded by American singer Fergie for her debut studio album, The Dutchess (2006). It was written by Fergie, Will Adams, and William Robinson, Jr. while the production was helmed by Adams under his stage name will.i.am. The song was released as a single in Australia and New Zealand on January 19, 2008. "Here I Come" is a hip hop and soul song. It contains a compositional sample of "Get Ready", a song written by Smokey Robinson and performed by The Temptations. The critical reception of "Here I Come" was positive, with many praising the use of the sample. "Here I Come" was a moderate success in Australia, peaking at number twenty-two on the chart. It also charted in the United States and New Zealand upon its digital release. The song has been used in many commercials to promote products such as Dr Pepper.

== Background ==
"Here I Come" was written by Fergie (credited as Stacy Ferguson) and will.i.am (credited as Will Adams). The song contains a compositional sample of "Get Ready", a song written by Smokey Robinson, credited as William Robinson Jr., for the American vocal group The Temptations. The song was one of the few songs recorded while on the John Lennon Educational Tour Bus, along with "Fergalicious". Will.i.am produced the song as well as playing the bass and drums. He also supervised in programming the drums and engineering the song, the latter in which he was aided by Joe Pelusso. Padraic Klein provided additional editing using Pro Tools. William Durst worked with Ethan Willoughby on mixing the song, which took place at Pacifique Recording Studios in North Hollywood, California. The song was released as a promotional single on January 19, 2008 to digital retailers in Australia, New Zealand, and the United States, among other territories.

== Composition ==
"Here I Come" is a hip hop and soul song that lasts for 3:23 (3 minutes and 23 seconds) and incorporates a compositional sample of "Get Ready" by The Temptations. The song features hand-clapping beats that is accompanied by a simple bass. According to the sheet music published by Hal Leonard Corporation at Musicnotes.com, it was composed in the key of D minor. The song is set in common time to an energized groove of 120 beats per minute. Like many of her songs on The Dutchess, Fergie sings and raps on "Here I Come". The song was noted by Norman Mayers of Prefix Magazine as a dance song that incorporates hip hop music from the 1980s and Motown from the 1960s.

== Critical reception ==
"Here I Come" received positive to mixed reviews for music critics. AllMusic writer Andy Kellman selected "Here I Come" as one of many tracks on the album that, according to him will not have any lasting or immediate value. Norman Meyers of Prefix Magazine thought it and "Fergalicious" are fun and flirty songs, writing that "they work because of the dance-floor productions that not only reference '80s hip-hop but also '60s Motown." Kelly Smith of The Maneater thought that the song did not do The Temptations' sample justice, claiming that "the classic gets butchered in the process." Mike Joseph of PopMatters writes that "Here I Come" and "Clumsy" use cute samples but they overall sound "awkward and forced." In Australia, the song debuted on the chart at number forty on the issue dated February 10, 2008. The song rose fifteen places to number twenty-five the following week and reached its peak position at number twenty-two a week later. It lasted a total of eleven weeks on the chart. In New Zealand, the song entered the chart at number thirty-nine on the issue dated March 31, 2008. It spent only one week on the chart.

== Uses in media ==
"Here I Come" was used in the ABC television series Ugly Betty on the nineteenth episode of season one, titled "Punch Out". It was also featured on the Fox television reality show So You Think You Can Dance on the episode for week five were dancers Kameron Brink and Lacey Schwimmer performed a hip-hop styled dance to it. The song was also used for a commercial promoting a Motorola product, Motorola Rokr, in mid-2008, in which Fergie was featured in. In January 2011, Fergie was featured in a commercial promoting Dr Pepper drinks with "Here I Come" playing in the background. The song was also featured in Season 1 of the Bad Girls Club. The song was also used on The CW launch of the new network promotions before its first premiere in September 2006.

== Credits and personnel ==
Recording and sample

- Recorded on the John Lennon Educational Tour Bus.
- Mixed at Pacifique Recording Studios in North Hollywood, California.
- Contains elements from the composition "Get Ready", written by William Robinson Jr under Jobete Music Company Incorporated (ASCAP).

Personnel

- Songwriting – Stacy Ferguson, Will Adams, William Robinson Jr.
- Production – will.i.am
- Bass, drums, drum programming – will.i.am
- Engineering – will.i.am, Joe Pelusso
- Pro Tools – Padraic Klein
- Mixing – Ethan Willoughby, William Durst (assistant)

Credits adapted from the liner notes of The Dutchess, A&M Records, will.i.am Music Group, Interscope Records.

== Charts ==
Chart performance for "Here I Come"
Chart (2008)	Peak position
Australia (ARIA)	22
New Zealand (Recorded Music NZ)	39
US Bubbling Under Hot 100 (Billboard)	22

== Certifications ==
Certifications for "Here I Come"
Region	Certification	Certified units/sales
Brazil (Pro-Música Brasil) DMS	Platinum	60,000^{*}
Brazil (Pro-Música Brasil)	2× Platinum	120,000^{‡}
^{*} Sales figures based on certification alone.^{‡} Sales+streaming figures based on certification alone.

== See also ==
- Get Ready (The Temptations song)
