= The Dutchess =

2006 studio album by Fergie

- Standard cover (Note: The Dutchess Deluxe cover displays a black background instead of red. Covers for The Dutchess +3 and the Australian tour edition use a still from the music video for "Fergalicious".)

Studio album by Fergie
- Released: September 13, 2006
- Recorded: 2005–2006
- Studios: Beet Market (Los Angeles); Chalice (Los Angeles); Chung King (New York); The Dragon's Lair (Los Angeles); El Cubano (Los Angeles); Hit Factory Criteria (Miami); John Lennon Educational Tour Bus; Metropolis (London); Morning View (Malibu); Record Plant (Los Angeles); Sing Sing (Melbourne); Stewcha (Los Angeles); Tree Sound (Atlanta)
- Genres: Pop; hip hop; R&B
- Length: 58:00
- Labels: A&M; will.i.am
- Producers: Printz Board; Rob Boldt; Ron Fair; Keith Harris; John Legend; George Pajon; Polow da Don; will.i.am

Fergie chronology
| The Dutchess (2006) | Double Dutchess (2017) |

Singles from The Dutchess
- 1. "London Bridge" Released: July 18, 2006; 2. "Fergalicious" Released: October 23, 2006; 3. "Glamorous" Released: January 23, 2007; 4. "Big Girls Don't Cry" Released: May 22, 2007; 5. "Clumsy" Released: September 25, 2007; 6. "Finally" Released: February 24, 2008

The Dutchess is the debut solo studio album by American singer-songwriter Fergie. It was released on September 13, 2006, by A&M Records and will.i.am Music Group. The album was recorded between The Black Eyed Peas' tour dates in 2005, and the songs were written in the eight years preceding its release. Fergie wanted to create an autobiographical album that would be more intimate between her and the listener. Musically, it experiments with different music genres, including pop, hip hop, R&B, reggae, punk rock and soul. Lyrically, it contains themes about critics, love, and her personal drug abuse and addiction.

The Dutchess peaked at number two on the US Billboard 200 and was praised by music critics for its production and Fergie's vocals, but some criticized its lyrics and felt the material was not strong enough for her voice. It has since been considered an influential pop album of the 2000s. It was certified five times platinum by the Recording Industry Association of America (RIAA) and platinum by the British Phonographic Industry (BPI), and has sold 12 million copies worldwide. It was nominated for the 2008 Grammy Award for Best Female Pop Vocal Performance ("Big Girls Don't Cry") and the 2008 Juno Award for International Album of the Year, among other accolades.

The Dutchess is one of the best-selling albums of the 2000s, propelled by five of its singles which set a number of records. "Big Girls Don't Cry", "Glamorous", and "London Bridge" topped the Billboard Hot 100, and "Clumsy" and "Fergalicious" appeared within the top five. Those singles also sold over two million digital downloads individually in the United States, setting a record in the digital era for the most multi-platinum singles from one album, which Fergie held until 2012.

== Background and recording ==
After ten years with the band Wild Orchid, Fergie joined the hip-hop group The Black Eyed Peas in 2002, replacing Kim Hill and receiving a prominent role in the group. Fergie's debut album with the band, Elephunk, was the group's breakthrough, spawning the worldwide hit singles "Where Is the Love?" and "Shut Up", selling over 8 million copies worldwide and receiving four Grammy nominations (and winning one for the song "Let's Get It Started"). Later, while releasing her second effort with the group, the even more successful Monkey Business (2005), which features the hit singles "Don't Phunk with My Heart" and "My Humps" (with both receiving a Grammy award) and sold 10 million copies worldwide, the singer announced that she and the other members of the group were working on solo projects, with her debut album being announced for a 2006 release. In an interview for Jam! Canoe, Fergie claimed, "We've been working on it, Will and I," she says. "And I'm so happy with the way it's turning out, but we just felt after 'Elephunk' that we needed to make another Black Eyed Peas record." Regarding the album's musical direction she said, "It'll be a deeper look into who I am. Soundwise, it'll be eclectic like the Peas but I'll get to experiment with more of the different sounds of my voice. I like to use my voice as an instrument sometimes and I'll be able to show that on that album."

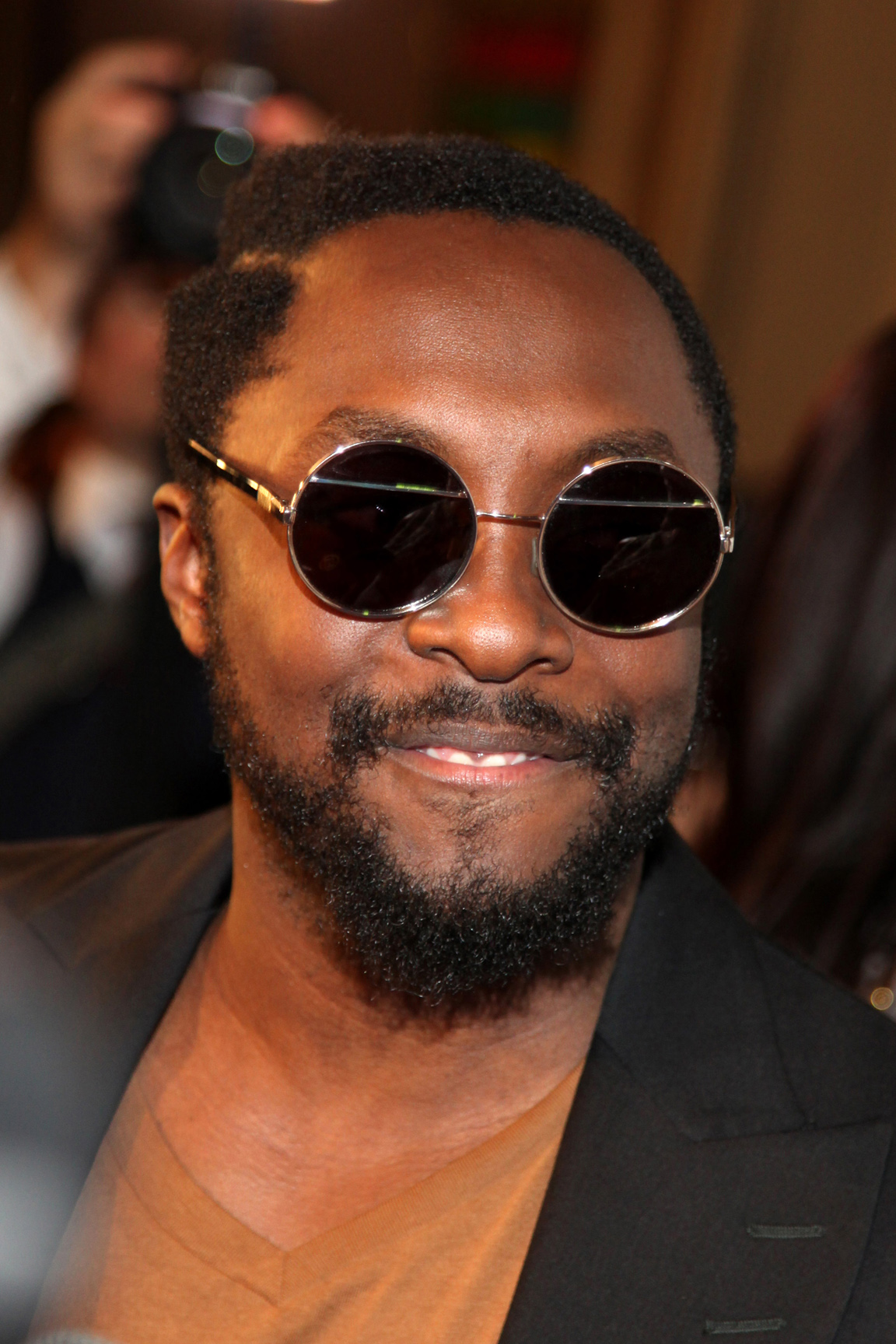
will.i.am, fellow member of The Black Eyed Peas, is the album's executive producer and produced eight songs.

The Dutchess was initially recorded in 2005, among promotion from The Black Eyed Peas' album Monkey Business. Much of the album was recorded on the John Lennon studio bus while touring with the band. She stated "We'd go in a couple of hours before going on stage and that's how it got done. The songs span a seven-year period. Some were done before I was in the Black Eyed Peas – we just updated them, and some were done in this one-month span that we took off from touring, which is very rare for us. Will and I moved into this studio house in Malibu called Morningview. It's like a ranch. It was very serene-complete opposite to the chaos of touring. I was alone a lot, which is something that doesn't happen to me on tour, so I got to find these emotions that are a little bit deeper than the surface. [For example], 'The Makeup Song (All That I Got)' and 'Velvet' are very intimate lyrically and feeling-wise. I wanted [the latter] to sound like velvet feels-very smooth-and I wanted it to be sensual."

According to Fergie, the songs on the album are "from a seven-year period, but [Interscope CEO] Jimmy Iovine heard some [tracks] and was like, 'This is great, let's put it out'. One of the album's executive producers and fellow Black Eyed Peas member will.i.am stated that she was "writing about her personal struggles and casting her demons away and feminine power. [It's] her singing for young girls to be strong, and what they're going through in life, just growing up in this world of uncertainty." Ludacris, John Legend, B Real from Cypress Hill and Rita Marley, Bob Marley's widow, were also confirmed on the album. B Real was set to appear on a track called "Thriller Man", an homage to Cypress Hill's "How I Could Just Kill a Man", with B Real stating, "It's pretty hot. Basically she took the song and switched the story around to suit it to her and put the female touch on it. She did the same chorus, she even did my same rhyme style, but she sung it. It's hard to describe it, you just got to hear it – she did it justice." However, "Thriller Man" was not included on the album. Ron Fair and DJ Mormile were also the album's executive producers, with Fair, chairman of Geffen Records, expressing, "Once people get this album and hear what she's capable of as a singer and writer, I think that's when the roof blows off it. That's when she's not just a little trifling pop girl doing disposable hits." It was also announced that the album would feature samples from Little Richard, The Commodores and The Temptations.

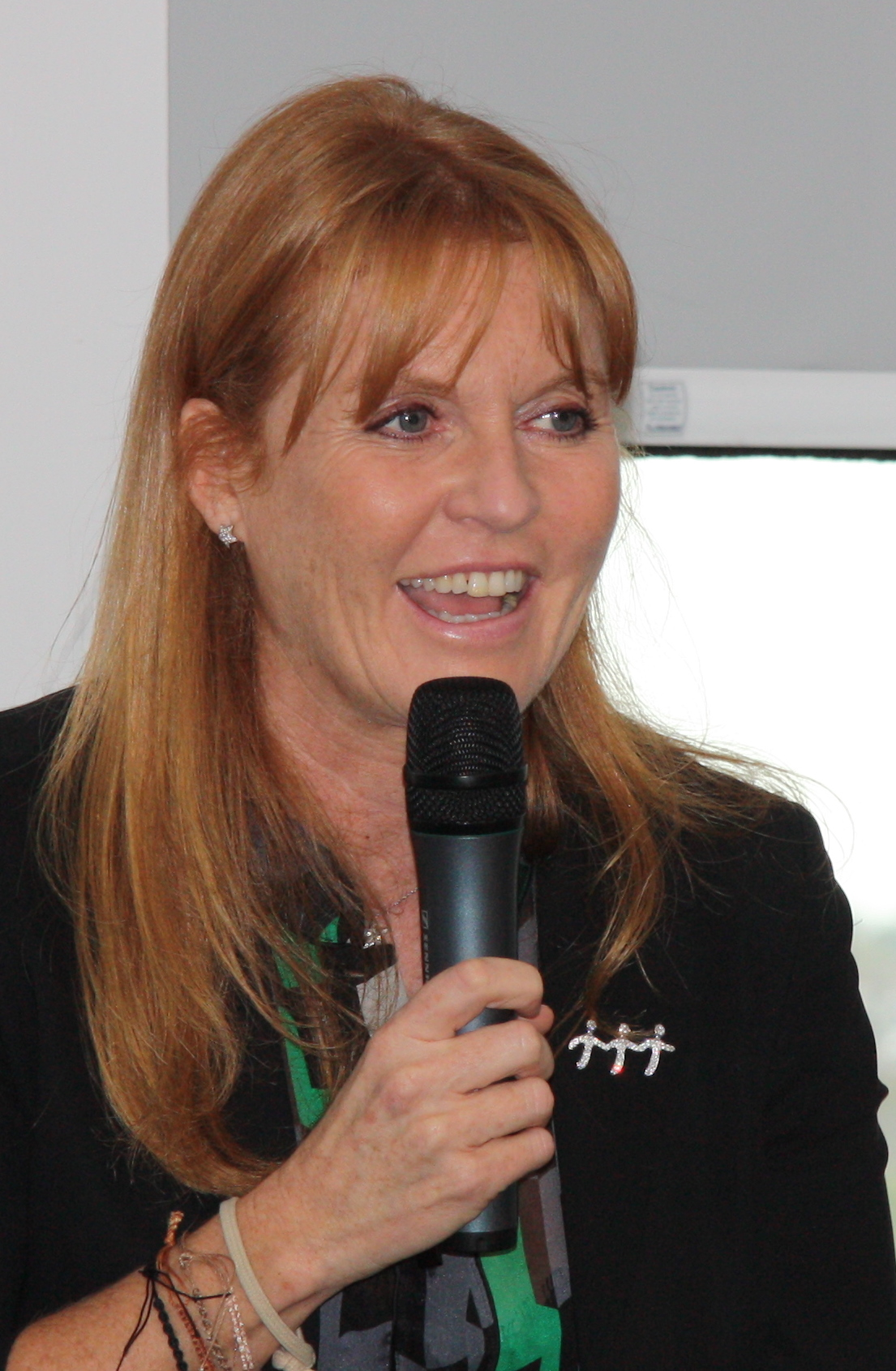
The album's title, The Dutchess, is a play on words from the Duchess of York. (pictured in 2008)

The album's title, The Dutchess, is a derivation of the noble title "The Duchess of York", as Fergie (a derivative of her last name "Ferguson") and Sarah "Fergie" Ferguson, the then Duchess of York, share a surname and nickname. Dutchess is not a misspelling of duchess, but an archaic spelling that fell out of use at the end of the twenthieth century. The album's title garnered media attention, with Sarah Ferguson commenting, "Automatically, everybody in America thinks I'm Fergie, the most beautiful woman in the world, from Black Eyed Peas. [...] You know, I rang her up about that. I said, 'Fergie, it's Fergie... Now that you've done this, you have to sing at a concert for my foundation Children in Crisis'." Fergie then commented about its title, "If you notice, on the album cover it says 'Fergie as the Dutchess' because I wanted each song to be a movie poster. But because 'London Bridge' did so well so fast, we had to get everything done so only half the songs on the album have movie poster themes. For example, for 'Fergalicious' I'm holding a lollipop; it's pretty campy and cute. The pictures were all shot by Ellen von Unwerth in Paris so a lot of them are very Brigitte Bardot-esque."

== Composition and themes ==
The Dutchess covers more personal subjects than Fergie's previous albums had, including past relationships, music critics and an addiction to methamphetamine she was then recovered from. It was described in The Age as "a more introspective Fergie". In interviews, Fergie described using vocal intonations to add personality to tracks, and combining genres and influences including "dub, there's reggae, there's stuff like the Temptations, a band that I saw when I was 10 years old in concert." Influences of hip-hop were, according to Fergie, "homage to artists like Roxanne Shanté, Monie Love, Salt-n-Pepa, JJ. Fad" who she had listened growing up. She described idolizing them, but viewing herself as far away from the environments and dangers being rapped about.

=== Music and lyrics ===
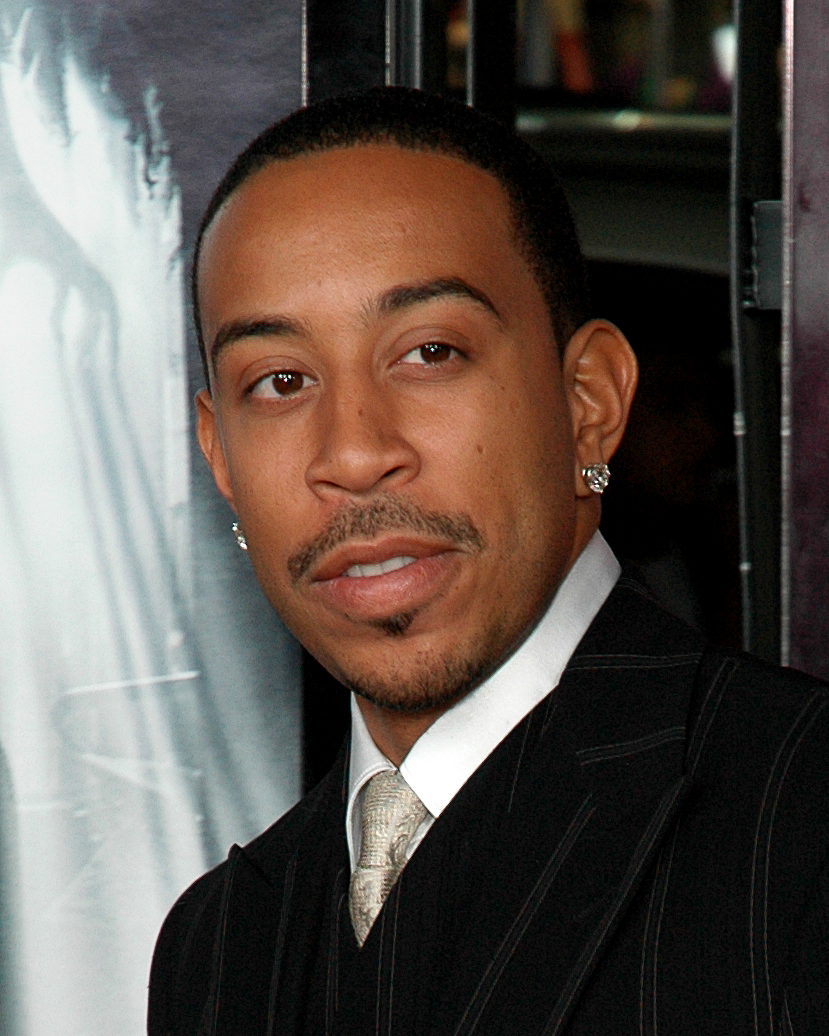
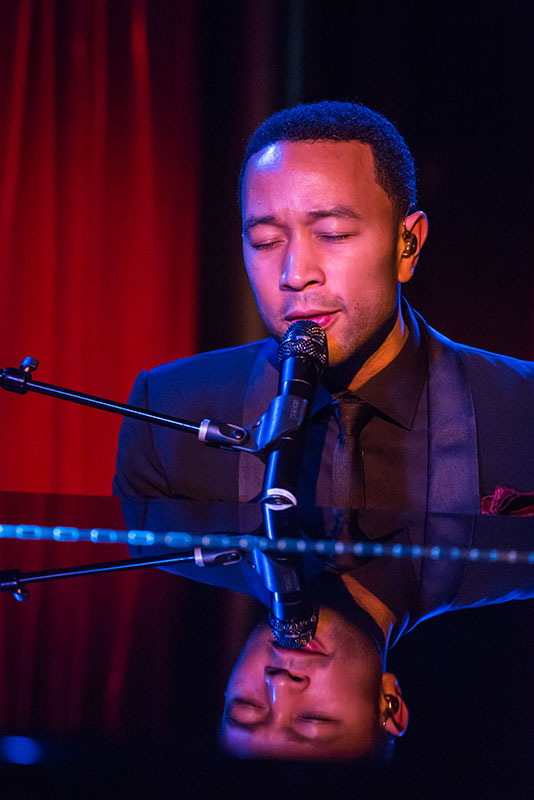
Ludacris (left) is featured on the R&B track "Glamorous", while John Legend is featured on the piano ballad "Finally".

The album starts with "Fergalicious", an electronica, hip hop and dance song, co-written which according to the song's co-writer, producer and featured guest, will.i.am, has Fergie "just being sassy and flaunting her stuff from a strong female perspective, paying homage to Salt-N-Pepa." He also labelled it "the sister of [Black Eyed Peas hit] My Humps'." Fergie stated that, "In 'Fergalicious,' I emulated ['80s female rap trio] J.J. Fad, and sampled the track from Afro-Rican's "Give It All You Got." Lyrically, the song uses food metaphors to describe how tasty the singer is. "Clumsy" follows, with will.i.am comparing the song to Shangri-Las "Leader of the Pack" with a ghetto-ass beat, guitars and background singers." Lyrically, it finds Fergie "trippin', stumblin', flippin', fumblin'" after being struck by Cupid's arrow. In "All That I Got (the Make-Up Song)", she wants a guy who will love her for more than her outward appearance, with the singer asking, "Would you love me/If I didn't work out/Or didn't change my natural hair?" "London Bridge" was co-written by Sean Garrett and produced by Polow da Don and includes sexual innuendo. It was described as "a club track that only lightly touches on personal lyrics about fame and celebrity" ('It's like every time I get up on the dude/ Paparazzi put my business in the news,' she sings), with the singer also threatening to mace pushy photographers and boasts. "It's poking fun at certain things. I'm really not going to spray the paparazzi with mace – I don't know if you know that about me," she said in an interview. Regarding the song's title, she claimed, "There are a couple things that you could relate with that title, but I'm just going to leave it to people's imagination."

"Pedestal" lashes out at gossip bloggers like Perez Hilton who "hide behind computer screens", as noted by Sal Cinquemani of Slant Magazine, while "Voodoo Doll" is a reggae song, with dub influences, where Fergie talks about her past and getting over those demons. According to Fergie, "It's about my struggle with crystal meth. There's a demon part that's a completely different voice than the singing part, and it's almost like two voices. It's me battling with myself." "Glamorous" is again produced by Polow da Don and features Ludacris. It was described as an R&B song with techno influences. Lyrically, it talks about how fame doesn't give her amnesia about where she came from. "Here I Come" features once more will.i.am and it is done to the tune of The Temptations' "Get Ready." In "Velvet", Fergie invites a man to share her bed. As stated by Fergie, "I wanted it to sound like velvet feels – very smooth – and I wanted it to be sensual." The pop/rock song "Big Girls Don't Cry" talks about a crumbling romance. will.i.am admitted that it "really pushed my production skills. I did an Edie Brickell type of production – 'I'm not aware of too many things,' on guitars."

"Mary Jane Shoes" is a song inspired in reggae, ska-punk and scat. It features Rita Marley, Bob Marley's widow, and I Threes. "That was quite an honor for me," Fergie said of the song. "I kind of get to play Bob Marley in that song, which is a beautiful thing." She went on to describe the song as "a breezy reggae song, and at the end I go into a little bit of punk-rock mosh music because I love to do that if you've ever seen my stage shows." will.i.am commented, "She goes from dub, doing her interpretation of roots, to some ska-punk and ends up with jazz. From a production standpoint that was fun, flipping all those different styles." The melody of the chorus bears striking resemblance to the chorus of Marley's "No Woman, No Cry." The song is followed by the ballad "Losing My Ground", which is about desperation, and the album closes with "Finally", a slightly Broadway-styled, ballad. It was named a "dramatic piano and string-laden coda" track. It was co-produced by John Legend, who also plays the piano. Lyrically, it reflects on lessons learned the hard way and decides that life is good. Fergie further explained the track: "'Finally' is the last song on the album. It's piano, strings and vocals, played by John Legend. He co-wrote that song. It's a timeless ballad that you can play 30 years from now, and it'll still be cool because it doesn't lend to any era. And it's really stripped down. I really had a chance to sing, although I didn't oversing anything. My taste is more to bring it out at certain moments."

== Release and promotion ==
"The Dutchess" was first released on September 13, 2006, in Japan and was released in the United States, Canada and New Zealand on September 19, 2006. On September 21, 2006, Fergie held a launch party for the album, after a day of radio and television promotion. She first performed "London Bridge" at the 2006 MTV Video Music Awards on the Red Carpet on the Rock pre-show. She also went to TRL, NBC's Today Show, So You Think You Can Dance and Late Show with David Letterman, performing the single "London Bridge". She also performed the track during 2006 Fashion Rocks, where she used a glittery mini-dress, and later was joined by her band The Black Eyed Peas to perform their single "Pump It". Fergie also went to the 2006 Billboard Music Awards, performing the single "Fergalicious". In 2007, Fergie continued the promotion of the album, being part of the AOL Sessions, Pepsi Smash Super Bowl Bash, Radio 1's Big Weekend, 2007 MuchMusic Video Awards, 2007 MTV Australia Video Music Awards, Concert for Diana, 2007 American Music Awards and more. To further promote the album, Fergie embarked on the Verizon VIP Tour, which began on May 8, 2007.

In April 2008, it was announced that The Dutchess was going to be re-released, with the inclusion of "Labels or Love," which first appeared on the soundtrack for the film Sex and the City (2008), Nelly's "Party People", "Barracuda" (a Heart cover) and a remix of "Clumsy" with Soulja Boy. Along with the four bonus tracks, the new package features an exclusive fold-out poster illustration of Fergie, an insert coupon discount to merchandise and a connect CD option providing video content. An EP with the four tracks on the deluxe edition plus a fifth song 'Pick It Up' was released to the iTunes Store. The Dutchess Deluxe EP debuted at number forty-six on the US Billboard 200 chart with sales of 11,000 copies.

=== Singles ===
"London Bridge" was released as the album's lead single on July 18, 2006, to radio stations and on August 7, 2006, on the iTunes Store. The urban pop track caused controversy due to its double entendre lyrics, topping the Billboard Hot 100 (for three weeks) and New Zealand charts, while also reaching the top-ten in over twelve countries. The music video for the song features The Black Eyed Peas members as well as Fergie on the Tower Bridge, among other scenes.

The following single, "Fergalicious", was released on October 23, 2006. The track, which features will.i.am, reached number two on the Billboard Hot 100, the top-five in Australia and New Zealand, although it peaked lower than "London Bridge" in Europe. Its music video features Fergie as Willy Wonka in a candy factory.

"Glamorous" was released as the third single from the album, on February 20, 2007. The track, which features Ludacris, became the second number-one single from the album in the United States, and also reached the top-ten in over seven countries.

The fourth single, "Big Girls Don't Cry", was released on May 22, 2007. The ballad became a huge success worldwide, topping the charts of ten countries, including Australia, Canada and the United States; it was also the album's most successful single in Europe. The music video for the song features American actor Milo Ventimiglia as her love interest.

"Clumsy" was then selected to be the fifth single of the album. It was released on September 25, 2007 and became a top-ten hit in five countries, including in Australia and the United States, becoming her fifth consecutive top-five hit in the U.S. Its music video features Fergie falling head over heels for love in various scenarios shot using a green screen.

"Finally" was released as the sixth and final single to the United States and the United Kingdom on March 18, 2008. A music video for the song was filmed, but it was never released.

"Pick It Up" was released as promotional single exclusively to Japan on January 1, 2007. The song "Here I Come" was released as promotional single in Australia and New Zealand on January 19, 2008. It reached the top-forty in both countries.

== Reception and legacy ==
Professional ratings
Aggregate scores
| Source | Rating |
|---|---|
| Metacritic | 58/100 |
Review scores
| Source | Rating |
| About.com | 4/5 stars |
| AllMusic | 2/5 stars |
| The Boston Phoenix | 3/5 stars |
| Entertainment Weekly | B+ |
| Los Angeles Times | 2/5 stars |
| MSN Music (Consumer Guide) | (choice cut) |
| PopMatters | 2/10 discs |
| Rolling Stone | 3.5/5 stars |
| Slant Magazine | 2.5/5 stars |
| Yahoo! Music | 7/10 |

Critical response to The Dutchess was mixed. At Metacritic, which assigns a normalized rating out of 100 to reviews from mainstream critics, the album has received an average score of 58, based on 15 reviews, which indicates "mixed or average reviews". "Big Girls Don't Cry" was nominated for a Grammy Award for Best Female Pop Vocal Performance. Leah Greenblatt wrote for Entertainment Weekly that "Though not every track is a gem, The Dutchess reaches further than most albums by contemporary divas," prov[ing] that she's earned her Black Eyed independence – and perhaps even her new royal title." Bill Lamb of About.com agreed, writing that it "is one of the top debuts of the year, [which] is good enough to pull into question the wisdom of Fergie sticking with the Black Eyed Peas or considering striking out on her own. [...] Adventurous, bold, and a whole lot of fun, she is an artist to be relished." Uncut called it "one of the most rambunctiously entertaining and high-spirited records of 2006," while Robert Christgau gave the album a "choice cut", praising the tracks "Fergalicious" and "London Bridge". Kathryn Perry of The Boston Phoenix named the album "an eclectic, danceable collection of hip-hop, R&B, and pop confections," while Rob Sheffield of Rolling Stone called it "a shameless solo debut full of Eighties-style electro bangers." Dan Gennoe of Yahoo! Music saw the album as "an exceptionally random R&B mixtape," but perceived that while "be[ing] loaded with future hits and staggering imagination, it's also fundamentally flawed."

In a more lukewarm review, Andy Kellman of AllMusic noted that the album is "mildly entertaining but tremendously taxing" and writing that the album has "passable switch-ups, but none of them has any lasting (or even immediate) value, with the possible exception of the inexplicably asinine 'London Bridge'." Sal Cinquemani of Slant Magazine analyzed that "the album too often seems to be striving to display diversity at the expense of artistry," also criticizing the song's lyrics, writing that they "don't delve very deep." Mike Joseph of PopMatters was more negative, observing that it "sounds like it was driven maybe 10% by an artist and 90% by a focus group. Fergie prances, preens, moans, talks and raps, but the result is canned and sterile." Although expressing that "Fergie is talented enough to compete with the likes of Gwen Stefani and Christina Aguilera," Norman Mayers of Prefix Magazine noted that "the material on 'The Dutchess' won't take her to those heights," while Benjamin Boles of Now pointed out that it "would've been better if they cut the 'serious' songs." Ann Powers of Los Angeles Times concluded that "the problem is the Duchess herself. Fergie exudes earthy charm, but can't keep up with the breakneck music. She forces emotion on the slower show-stoppers, and she's all cartoon kitten on the come-ons."

While analyzing the album after eight years of its release, Jason Lipshutz of Billboard commented: "A monster hit by any metric, as well as an underrated pop pastiche that introduced the world to a fearlessly individual female artist that had been hiding in plain sight. It arrived, it conquered, and eight years later, it still has no upshot." [...] "It's a weird, wild debut, and one of the most successful ones of this century. Fergie deserves retroactive praise for an uncompromising first look, and we'll keep spelling 'tasty' with an E tucked in the middle."

== Commercial performance ==
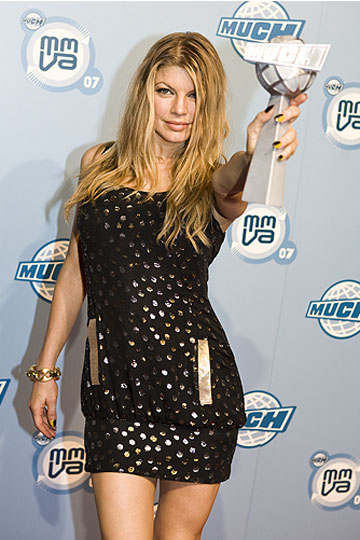
The album earned Fergie three number one singles on the US Billboard Hot 100, including two more songs in the top five.

The Dutchess debuted at number three on the US Billboard 200 with sales of 142,000 copies in its first week. It later fell to number nine, selling 74,000 copies. After four weeks falling on the charts, The Dutchess became the "greatest gainer" of the week ending November 18, 2006, climbing from number twenty-one to number fourteen. In 2007, the album remained inside the top-twenty, while in March it kept on climbing, due to the success of its single "Glamorous", which was inside the top-ten at the time. In May, the album continued its success, becoming once more the "greatest gainer", reaching number twelve on the week ending May 5, 2007. After the Concert for Diana, in which Fergie performed, the album reached number eleven, becoming for the third time the week's "greatest gainer". A week later, the album re-entered the top with the aid of the single "Big Girls Don't Cry," ascending to number eight in its forty-third week on the chart with 50,000 copies. The song kept on climbing the following weeks, remaining at number six for two weeks, with sales of 50,000 and 56,000 copies, respectively. It later fell to number nine with sales of 53,000 copies, and climbed to numbers 8 and 7 in the following weeks. After fifty-one weeks on the chart, The Dutchess reached a new peak on the US Billboard 200 chart, climbing to number two with sales of 49,000 copies. It spent ninety-four weeks on the albums chart, and went on to sell 3.9 million copies, according to Nielsen SoundScan.

In the United Kingdom, it debuted at number twenty-seven and eventually peaked at number eighteen, spending thirty weeks on the chart. It was later certified platinum by the British Phonographic Industry (BPI) for selling over 300,000 copies. In Australia, the album debuted at number thirteen, before moving to number ten. The album kept on falling on the charts, before re-entering at number thirty-five on May 13, 2007. It entered the top-ten once again with the success of "Big Girls Don't Cry", which brought the album to rise until reach a peak of number-one for four consecutive weeks. It has shifted over 210,000 copies and it was certified triple platinum by the Australian Recording Industry Association, spending sixty-two weeks inside the nation's top-fifty, and twenty-one weeks inside the top ten. The album also received platinum certifications in Canada, Japan, New Zealand, Poland and Russia. It has sold over twelve million copies worldwide.

The Dutchess became one of the most commercially successful albums of 2006 and 2007, spawning five top-five hits in the United States. When the album's fourth single, "Big Girls Don't Cry", was released, she became the first female artist with three number-ones from one album since Christina Aguilera in 2000. In the United States, with the fifth single "Clumsy" climbing to the top ten, Fergie earned her fifth top-five hit, becoming the first album to produce five top five singles in the 21st century, being surpassed only in 2010 by Katy Perry with her third studio album Teenage Dream. The album also set a new record in the digital era for the most multi-platinum singles from one album, with each single selling over two million digital downloads in the United States. Fergie held this record until 2012, when Katy Perry surpassed her again, achieving six multi-platinum singles with her album Teenage Dream (2010). Fergie also had five consecutive top-five hits in Australia, becoming the second artist to achieve the feat with a debut album; the first artist to do so was Delta Goodrem with her 2003 album, Innocent Eyes, which had five consecutive number ones.

== Track listing ==
The Dutchess
| No. | Title | Writer(s) | Producer(s) | Length |
|---|---|---|---|---|
| 1. | "Fergalicious" (featuring will.i.am) | William Adams; Stacy Ferguson; Dania Maria Birks; Juana Michelle Burns; Juanita A. Lee; Kim Nazel; Fatima Shaheed; Derrick Rahming | will.i.am | 4:52 |
| 2. | "Clumsy" | Adams; Ferguson; Bobby Troup | will.i.am | 4:00 |
| 3. | "All That I Got (The Make Up Song)" (featuring will.i.am) | Adams; Ferguson; Keith Harris; Lionel Richie; Ronald LaPread Sr. | Harris; will.i.am; Ron Fair^{[a]} | 4:05 |
| 4. | "London Bridge" | Ferguson; Jamal Jones; Sean Garrett; Mike Hartnett | Polow da Don | 4:01 |
| 5. | "Pedestal" | Ferguson; Printz Board | Board | 3:22 |
| 6. | "Voodoo Doll" | Ferguson; Adams | will.i.am | 4:23 |
| 7. | "Glamorous" (featuring Ludacris) | Ferguson; Jones; Adams; Elvis Williams; Christopher Bridges | Polow da Don | 4:08 |
| 8. | "Here I Come" (featuring will.i.am) | Adams; Ferguson; William Robinson Jr. | will.i.am | 3:21 |
| 9. | "Velvet" | Ferguson; George Pajon Jr.; Michael Fratantuno | will.i.am; Pajon Jr. | 4:53 |
| 10. | "Big Girls Don't Cry" | Ferguson; Toby Gad | will.i.am; Fair^{[a]} | 4:28 |
| 11. | "Mary Jane Shoes" (featuring Rita Marley and I-Three) | Ferguson; Vincent Ford; Adams | will.i.am | 3:55 |
| 12. | "Losing My Ground" | Ferguson; Stefanie Ridel; Renee Sandstrom; Rob Boldt | Boldt; Fair | 4:08 |
| 13. | "Finally" (featuring John Legend) | John Stephens; Ferguson; Ridel | Legend; Fair; Ridel^{[a]} | 4:52 |
| 14. | "Maybe We Can Take a Ride" (hidden track) | Ferguson; Harris; Printz Board | Harris; will.i.am | 3:34 |
| Total length: | | | | 58:00 |

Digital edition
| No. | Title | Writer(s) | Producer(s) | Length |
|---|---|---|---|---|
| 14. | "Close to You" | Ferguson; Boldt | Boldt; Fair | 4:26 |
| 15. | "Paradise" | Ferguson; Adams; Jay Beckenstein | will.i.am | 4:28 |
| Total length: | | | | 66:34 |

International editions (Note: attributed to Australian, Brazilian, European, Japanese, and South African CD pressings)
| No. | Title | Writer(s) | Producer(s) | Length |
|---|---|---|---|---|
| 14. | "Get Your Hands Up" (featuring The Black Eyed Peas) | Ferguson; Adams; Melvin Lewis; Michael Matthews; Jean-Baptiste; Anthony Tidd; Jaime Gomez; Allan Pineda; Jaime Munson | Noizetrip | 3:33 |

International deluxe edition
| No. | Title | Writer(s) | Producer(s) | Length |
|---|---|---|---|---|
| 15. | "Wake Up" | Ferguson; Adams; Ray Brady | will.i.am; Fair^{[a]} | 3:03 |

The Dutchess Deluxe
| No. | Title | Writer(s) | Producer(s) | Length |
|---|---|---|---|---|
| 14. | "Barracuda" | Ann Wilson; Nancy Wilson; Michael DeRosier; Roger Fisher | will.i.am | 4:39 |
| 15. | "Party People" (Nelly and Fergie) | Cornell Haynes; Ferguson; Jones; Garrett | Polow da Don | 4:02 |
| 16. | "Clumsy" (Collipark Remix) (featuring Soulja Boy Tell 'Em) | Ferguson; Adams; Troup | Mr. Collipark; The Package Store | 3:52 |
| 17. | "Labels or Love" | Salaam Remi; Rico Love; Douglas Cuomo | Salaamremi.com | 3:51 |

=== Notes ===
- ^{^a} signifies a vocal producer
- "Maybe We Can Take a Ride" appears as a hidden track on all editions, before the bonus tracks.
- Digital edition was originally exclusive to US and Canadian iTunes Store.
- Australian and UK pressings use the same track listing as the international deluxe edition. Japanese pressings and the UK deluxe edition additionally include "Paradise".
- In addition to "Paradise", Japanese deluxe edition pressings include the cover of "True" by Spandau Ballet. (Note: produced by will.i.am) The Dutchess +3 pressings include "Pick It Up", (Note: written by Fergie, will.i.am, and Keith Harris; produced by will.i.am and Harris, with vocal production by Ron Fair) "Personal", (Note: J.R. Rotem-produced remix of "Big Girls Don't Cry" featuring Sean Kingston) and a remix of "Clumsy", excluding "True".
- Japanese deluxe edition pressings include a bonus DVD containing the music videos for "London Bridge", "Fergalicious", and "Glamorous".
- Australian tour edition pressings include "Paradise", "Personal", and the Pajon Rock and Collipark remixes of "Clumsy".
- Japanese edition of The Dutchess Deluxe includes a bonus DVD containing the music videos for "London Bridge", "Fergalicious", "Glamorous", "Big Girls Don't Cry", and "Clumsy", alongside the extended video for "Big Girls Don't Cry" and the making-of footage for "Clumsy".

Sample credits

- "Fergalicious" contains an interpolation of "Supersonic" by J.J. Fad, and a sample from "Give It All You Got" by Afro-Rican.
- "Clumsy" contains a sample from "The Girl Can't Help It" by Little Richard.
- "All That I Got (The Make-Up Song)" contains a sample from "Zoom" by the Commodores.
- "Here I Come" contains a sample from "Get Ready" by the Temptations.
- "Mary Jane Shoes" contains an interpolation of "No Woman, No Cry" by Bob Marley and the Wailers.

== Charts ==
=== Weekly charts ===
2006–2008 weekly chart performance
| Chart | Peak position |
|---|---|
| Australian Albums (ARIA) | 1 |
| Australian Urban Albums (ARIA) | 1 |
| Austrian Albums (Ö3 Austria) | 17 |
| Belgian Albums (Ultratop Flanders) | 45 |
| Belgian Albums (Ultratop Wallonia) | 63 |
| Canadian Albums (Billboard) | 4 |
| Czech Albums (ČNS IFPI) | 19 |
| Danish Albums (Hitlisten) | 27 |
| Dutch Albums (Album Top 100) | 46 |
| French Albums (SNEP) | 44 |
| German Albums (Offizielle Top 100) | 11 |
| Hungarian Albums (MAHASZ) | 25 |
| Irish Albums (IRMA) | 9 |
| Italian Albums (FIMI) | 29 |
| Japanese Albums (Oricon) | 3 |
| New Zealand Albums (RMNZ) | 2 |
| Norwegian Albums (VG-lista) | 17 |
| Polish Albums (ZPAV) | 14 |
| Portuguese Albums (AFP) | 25 |
| Scottish Albums (Official Charts) | 19 |
| Spanish Albums (Promusicae) | 93 |
| Swedish Albums (Sverigetopplistan) | 35 |
| Swiss Albums (Schweizer Hitparade) | 11 |
| Taiwanese Albums (Five Music) | 1 |
| UK Albums (Official Charts) | 18 |
| UK R&B Albums (Official Charts) | 1 |
| US Billboard 200 | 2 |

2008 weekly chart performance for The Dutchess Deluxe EP
| Chart | Peak position |
|---|---|
| US Billboard 200 | 46 |

=== Year-end charts ===
2006 year-end chart performance
| Chart | Position |
|---|---|
| Australian Urban Albums (ARIA) | 16 |
| Greek International Albums (IFPI) | 26 |
| Japanese Albums (Oricon) | 45 |
| US Billboard 200 | 115 |
| Worldwide Albums (IFPI) | 26 |

2007 year-end chart performance
| Chart | Position |
|---|---|
| Australian Albums (ARIA) | 5 |
| Australian Urban Albums (ARIA) | 2 |
| New Zealand Albums (RMNZ) | 28 |
| UK Albums (OCC) | 85 |
| US Billboard 200 | 3 |
| Worldwide Albums (IFPI) | 20 |

2008 year-end chart performance
| Chart | Position |
|---|---|
| Australian Albums (ARIA) | 64 |
| US Billboard 200 | 45 |

=== Decade-end charts ===
2000s decade-end chart performance
| Chart | Position |
|---|---|
| Australian Albums (ARIA) | 94 |
| US Billboard 200 | 78 |

== Certifications ==
Certifications and sales
| Region | Certification | Certified units/sales |
|---|---|---|
| Argentina (CAPIF) | Gold | 20,000^{^} |
| Australia (ARIA) | 4× Platinum | 280,000^{^} |
| Brazil (Pro-Música Brasil) | Platinum | 60,000^{*} |
| Canada (Music Canada) | 3× Platinum | 300,000^{^} |
| Denmark (IFPI Danmark) | Platinum | 20,000^{‡} |
| Germany (BVMI) | Gold | 100,000^{^} |
| Hungary (MAHASZ) | Gold | 7,500^{^} |
| Japan (RIAJ) | Platinum | 250,000^{^} |
| New Zealand (RMNZ) | 4× Platinum | 60,000^{‡} |
| Poland (ZPAV) | Platinum | 20,000^{*} |
| Russia (NFPF) | 3× Platinum | 60,000^{*} |
| Singapore (RIAS) | Gold | 5,000^{*} |
| Switzerland (IFPI Switzerland) | Gold | 15,000^{^} |
| United Kingdom (BPI) | Platinum | 300,000^{^} |
| United States (RIAA) | 5× Platinum | 5,000,000^{‡} |
^{*} Sales figures based on certification alone.^{^} Shipments figures based on certification alone.^{‡} Sales+streaming figures based on certification alone.

== Release history ==
Release dates and formats
| Region | Date | Edition(s) | Format(s) | Label(s) | Ref. |
|---|---|---|---|---|---|
| Japan | September 13, 2006 | Standard | CD | Universal | |
| Australia | September 15, 2006 | Standard | CD | Universal | |
| Argentina | September 16, 2006 | Standard | CD | Universal | |
| United Kingdom | September 18, 2006 | Standard | CD | Polydor | |
| Various (Note: excluding North America) | September 18, 2006 | 2006 deluxe | Digital download | Universal | |
| Canada | September 19, 2006 | Standard | CD; digital download | Universal | |
| New Zealand | September 19, 2006 | Standard | CD | Universal | |
| United States | September 19, 2006 | Standard | CD; digital download | A&M; will.i.am | |
| Sweden | September 20, 2006 | Standard | CD | Universal | |
| Germany | September 22, 2006 | Standard | CD | Universal | |
| Brazil | October 25, 2006 | Standard | CD; digital download | Universal | |
| Japan | March 7, 2007 | 2007 deluxe | CD+DVD | Universal | |
| Japan | November 7, 2007 | +3 | CD | Universal | |
| Australia | January 14, 2008 | Tour | CD | Universal | |
| Denmark | May 26, 2008 | 2008 deluxe | CD | Universal | |
| Sweden | May 26, 2008 | 2008 deluxe | CD | Universal | |
| United Kingdom | May 26, 2008 | 2008 deluxe | Digital download | Polydor | |
| Canada | May 27, 2008 | 2008 deluxe | CD | Universal | |
| United States | May 27, 2008 | 2008 deluxe | CD | A&M; will.i.am | |
| Japan | May 31, 2008 | 2008 deluxe | CD+DVD | Universal | |
| Australia | June 2, 2008 | 2008 deluxe | CD | Universal | |
| Various | December 2, 2016 | Standard | Vinyl | Interscope; UM^{e} | |
