= Party People (Nelly song) =

2008 single by Fergie and Nelly

Single by Nelly featuring Fergie

from the album Brass Knuckles and The Dutchess: Deluxe edition
- B-side: "Cut It Out"
- Released: March 18, 2008
- Recorded: 2007
- Genre: Crunk; hip hop; R&B
- Length: 4:02
- Label: Derrty; Universal Motown
- Songwriters: Cornell Haynes; Jamal Jones; Sean Garrett; Stacy Ferguson
- Producers: Polow da Don; Garrett (co.)

Nelly singles chronology
"5000 Ones" (2007)	"Party People" (2008)	"Here I Am" (2008)

Fergie singles chronology
"Clumsy" (2007)	"Party People" (2008)	"Finally" (2008)

Music video
- "Party People" on YouTube

"Party People" is a song recorded by American rapper Nelly featuring American singer Fergie. It was released on March 18, 2008, as the lead single for Nelly's fifth studio album, Brass Knuckles, and was featured on the deluxe edition of Fergie's debut album, The Dutchess (both released in 2008). Both artists co-wrote the track with producer Polow da Don and co-producer Sean Garrett. The song garnered negative reviews from music critics.

"Party People" peaked at numbers 40 and 62 on both the Billboard Hot 100 and Hot R&B/Hip-Hop Songs charts, respectively. It also reached the top 20 in countries like Australia, Ireland, New Zealand and the UK. A music video for the single, directed by Marc Webb, takes place in an underground room with cameos by Polow da Don, Keri Hilson and Ciara.

== Background ==
The song was originally intended for Fergie's debut album, The Dutchess (on the Deluxe Edition of which it now appears), and featured Miami-based rapper Trina. Originally, the track was played and intended to feature Houston rapper Chamillionaire, before he passed up on the offer. In yet another (see "Love in This Club") example of Polow da Don releasing tracks or beats before they were intended, he then played the track for Nelly who immediately decided that he wanted to use the beat.

== Critical reception ==
Azeem Ahmad of musicOMH called it "Brass Knuckles' surprise track", saying it "feels like a rap battle between the two artists". AllMusic's David Jeffries felt the song came across like a "dull outtake" from either Sweat or Suit. Nick Levine of Digital Spy wrote: "[T]his is no disaster, but if Nelly really wants to excite the party people, he needs to come up with something a little less monotonous." Roman Cooper of HipHopDX found Fergie's gangsta delivery "laughable." PopMatters contributor Chris Gaerig called it "the worst single" Nelly has ever released, saying it "sounds like Fergie aping a Three 6 Mafia production."

== Chart performance ==
On the week of April 12, 2008, "Party People" debuted at numbers 54 and 90 on both the Billboard Hot 100 and Hot R&B/Hip-Hop Songs charts respectively. The following week, it debuted at number 24 on the Hot Rap Songs chart. On the week of May 3, the song peaked at number 40 on the Hot 100, staying on the chart for ten weeks. The following week, it reached number 62 on the Hot R&B/Hip-Hop Songs chart, also staying there for ten weeks. It also reached number 16 on the Hot Rap Songs chart the week of May 17, and remained there for eight weeks. The following week, the song peaked at number 22 on the Rhythmic chart, also staying there for eight weeks.

For the week of April 13, 2008, "Party People" debuted at number 77 on the UK Singles Chart. It peaked at number 14 the week of May 25 and remained on the chart for eleven weeks. In Canada, the track debuted at number 63 on the Canadian Hot 100 the week of May 3, 2008, and peaked at number 52 the following week.

== Music video ==
The video was shot in Los Angeles, California and directed by Marc Webb. Polow da Don, Keri Hilson and Ciara make cameos in the video.

The video premiered on MTV on April 14, 2008. The video begins with many lights switching on revealing a large underground room where the room is suddenly filled with many people. We see Fergie on a swing high above the ground while Nelly rises up out of the ground in a cloud of smoke. The rest of the video continues with Nelly and Fergie rapping into the camera while breaking up fights at the party and images of Fergie walking along a walkway as well as jumping on Nelly's back. In the middle of the video Nelly and Fergie rap aggressively at each other atop a raised platform before another short image shows Fergie sitting on the swing again. The video ends with a cameo from R&B singer Keri Hilson sporting a black T-shirt sporting the slogan "Hip Hop Aint Dead".

Nelly and Fergie performed "Party People" at the 2008 BET Awards.

== Track listing ==
UK CD single

1. "Party People" (Clean)
2. "Party People" (Explicit)
3. "Cut It Out"

== Charts ==
=== Weekly charts ===
Chart (2008)	Peak position
Australia (ARIA)	14
Austria (Ö3 Austria Top 40)	46
Belgium (Ultratip Bubbling Under Flanders)	5
Belgium (Ultratip Bubbling Under Wallonia)	18
Canada Hot 100 (Billboard)	52
Euro Digital Song Sales (Billboard)	18
Germany (GfK)	23
Ireland (IRMA)	12
Netherlands (Dutch Top 40 Tipparade)	16
New Zealand (Recorded Music NZ)	7
Scottish Singles Sales (Official Charts)	7
UK Singles (Official Charts)	14
UK Hip Hop/R&B (Official Charts)	2
US Billboard Hot 100	40
US Hot R&B/Hip-Hop Songs (Billboard)	62
US Hot Rap Songs (Billboard)	16
US Pop 100 (Billboard)	37
US Rhythmic Airplay (Billboard)	22

=== Year-end charts ===
Chart (2008)	Position
Australia (ARIA)	92
UK Singles (OCC)	147

== Release history ==
Release dates and formats for "Party People"
Region	Date	Format	Label(s)	Ref.
United States	April 29, 2008	Mainstream airplay	Universal Motown	
