= Big Girls Don't Cry (Fergie song) =

2007 single by Fergie

Single by Fergie

from the album The Dutchess
- B-side: "Pedestal"
- Released: May 22, 2007
- Studio: Metropolis (London, England)
- Genre: Pop
- Length: 4:28
- Label: A&M; will.i.am; Interscope
- Songwriters: Stacy Ferguson; Toby Gad
- Producer: will.i.am

Fergie singles chronology
"Glamorous" (2007)	"Big Girls Don't Cry" (2007)	"Clumsy" (2007)

Music video
- "Big Girls Don't Cry (Personal)" on YouTube

"Big Girls Don't Cry" (also known as "Big Girls Don't Cry (Personal)") is a song by American singer-songwriter Fergie from her debut solo studio album, The Dutchess (2006). It was written by Fergie and Toby Gad while the production was helmed by will.i.am. The song was released as the fourth single from the album on May 22, 2007. "Big Girls Don't Cry" deviates from the hip hop and urban music of Fergie's previous singles and opts for a more simplistic pop ballad sound that incorporates acoustic elements. It features credits from about thirty instrumentalists, many of which play the violins, violas and celli on the track. Lyrically, the song talks about moving on from the pain of a breakup.

The critical reception of "Big Girls Don't Cry" was positive, with many praising the maturity and simplicity displayed on the single as well as the message. The song was a commercial success domestically, attaining the top position on the Billboard Hot 100. It became her third single to do so and earned her the accolade of being the first female artist with three number-one singles from one album since Christina Aguilera in 2000. "Big Girls Don't Cry" also became Fergie's longest-charting and highest-selling single in the US with 3,833,000 units sold as of August 2012. The song also reached number one in eleven international territories, including Australia, where it spent nine weeks at the top position, became the highest-selling song of 2007, and was certified quintuple platinum. It was also the most-played song on Brazilian radio in 2007.

The accompanying music video for the song was directed by Anthony Mandler and released in May 2007. It depicts Fergie and her love interest, portrayed by actor Milo Ventimiglia, in their turbulent relationship that ultimately ends with Fergie packing up her belongings and driving away in her car. The music video featured Fergie in apparel designed by Candie's and was used by the brand to promote their clothing line.

== Background ==
"Big Girls Don't Cry" was written by Fergie (credited as Stacy Ferguson) and Toby Gad. The song was recorded at the Metropolis Recording Studio in London, England. will.i.am produced the song as well as playing the bass, supervising in programming the drums and engineering the song.

In discussing the album with Clover Hope of Billboard, will.i.am described the production of this song to be his most challenging yet, saying that "I did an Edie Brickell type of production." He was aided by Neil Tucker and Tal Herzberg, who also provided additional editing with the use of Pro Tools technology.

The song features a large number of instrumentalists on the song. On the basses are Trey Henry and Mike Valerio while Keith Harris plays the drums, keyboard bass and keys. George Pajon Jr. plays the guitar. "Big Girls Don't Cry" features eighteen violinists, four people on the violas, and four people on the celli. The strings were arranged and conducted by Ron Fair, who also produced the additional vocals on the song. They were recorded by Allen Sides at the Signet Sound.

The song was mixed at Ocean Way Recordings in Hollywood, California, by Jack Joseph Puig and Dean Nelson. A&M Records, in association with will.i.am Music Group and Interscope Records, sent the song to contemporary hit radio on May 22, 2007, in the United States.

== Composition ==
"Big Girls Don't Cry" has a length of 4 minutes and 28 seconds. It incorporates elements from different genres such as acoustic folk and is composed by simple drums, synthesizers, violins, strings, viola, and celli. The song is written in the key of G major and is set in time signature of common time with a moderate pop tempo of 113 beats per minute. Fergie's vocal range spans from the high-tone of C_{5} to the lower register of G_{3}. The song has a basic sequence of G–Csus2–D5 as its chord progression.

The song is a ballad about the end of a relationship and dealing with personal issues.

== Critical reception ==
"Big Girls Don't Cry" received general acclaim. Spence D. of IGN writes that the album's aura diminishes as "Big Girls Don't Cry" plays and comments "Listening to this song it begins to dawn on you that by this juncture the album has strategically delivered a song tailor made for each of the varying commercial radio formats."

Mike Joseph of PopMatters praised the song for permitting her vocal ability to shine. Bill Lamb of About.com rated the song four out of five stars, praising the mood, lyrics and vocals as "mellow, still sexy", "intelligent" and "strong". He noted however that there could be a moment in the song where it all catches fire. Lamb further added that the simple, gentle back lets the track unfolds on its own and that the song represents artistic growth on Fergie and will.i.am's part after time off from the Black Eyed Peas. Kelly Smith of The Maneater felt differently about the song, finding it disappointing and the lyrics.

Alex MacGregor of UKMix.org compared the single to Gwen Stefani's "4 in the Morning", stating that they both have a timeless, Cyndi Lauper feel to them; he gave a four-star rating to "Big Girls Don't Cry". James Simon of CHARTattack describes the song as having an "emotive acoustic sentimentalism," while Dan Gennoe compared it and "Voodoo Doll" to Pink's style of music, calling them "pure Pink!".

== Chart performance ==
On May 5, 2007, "Big Girls Don't Cry" entered the Billboard Hot 100 at number 41, becoming the week's highest debut, and the Hot Digital Songs chart at number 21. In its sixth week on the chart, it entered the top 10 tier at number eight. The following week it moved up four places to number four. After 12 weeks of fluctuating in the top five, the song reached the summit of the Hot 100 on the week of September 8, 2007, replacing Sean Kingston's "Beautiful Girls".

The song became Fergie's third number one single in the United States as a solo artist as well as the fourth top five single from The Dutchess album. The song earned her the accolade of being the first female artist to attain three number one US singles from an album since 2000, when Christina Aguilera did so with her third single, "Come On Over Baby (All I Want Is You)", from her eponymous debut album.

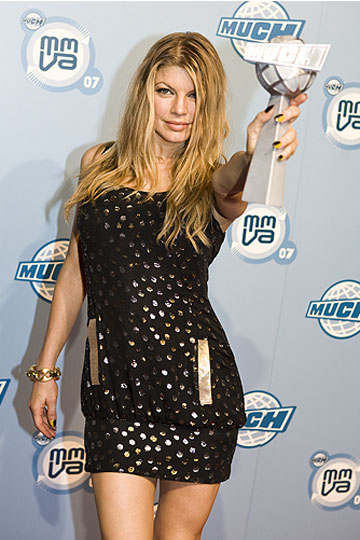
"Big Girls Don't Cry" became Fergie's third solo single to attain the top position on the Billboard Hot 100, following "London Bridge" and "Glamorous".

The song also charted at number one on the Radio Songs chart, the Pop Songs chart and the Adult Contemporary chart. The song was certified platinum on December 6, 2007, by the Recording Industry Association of America (RIAA). Its digital download sales stand at 3,549,000, becoming her first single to surpass sales of three million downloads. "Big Girls Don't Cry" is Fergie's most downloaded song, ahead of "Fergalicious", "Glamorous", "Clumsy", and "London Bridge". In Canada, the song debuted on the Canadian Hot 100 at number 17 on the issue dated June 2, 2007. "Big Girls Don't Cry" entered the top five in its third week and reached number one in its seventh week on the chart. It logged three consecutive weeks at the summit and a total of 53 weeks on the chart.

In Australia, "Big Girls Don't Cry" debuted and peaked at number one on the issue dated July 22, 2007. It ended Rihanna's six-week hold at the top position with "Umbrella" and barred the song from entering the position for three weeks. The song logged nine weeks at the top position, from July 22 to September 16, 2007, and continued to chart for 32 weeks. It became her highest-charting single in the country as well as her longest-charting and highest-selling single there, beating out her previous single "Glamorous". The song was Australia's best-selling single of 2007 and has been certified double platinum by the Australian Recording Industry Association (ARIA) for sales of 140,000 units.

On May 28, 2007, the song entered the chart in New Zealand at number 28. The song entered the top three in its fourth week on the chart. "Big Girls Don't Cry" reached number one on the issue dated July 23, 2007, and has been certified platinum by the Recording Industry Association of New Zealand (RIANZ) for sales of 15,000 units. It was the second highest-selling single of the year, only behind Rihanna's "Umbrella".

The song also achieved chart success in the European market. "Big Girls Don't Cry" first entered the UK Singles Chart on June 17, 2007, at number 60. It quickly rose into the top 10 region and peaked at number two during its fifth week on the chart. The song reached number three in Switzerland in its 11th week and logged 34 weeks on the chart. In Sweden, the song entered the top 20 of the Singles chart on July 19, 2007, rising from number 54 the previous week.

On August 23, 2007, the song peaked on the chart at number four and maintained that position for two non-consecutive weeks. It was later certified gold by the International Federation of the Phonographic Industry (Sweden). The song was also certified gold in Norway and reached the top position of the chart on the issue dated September 11, 2007, lasting three consecutive weeks at its peak position.

The song has been ranked 115th by Billboard on its 600 most massive smashes over the chart's six decades.

== Music video ==
Fergie in the music video

The music video was directed by Anthony Mandler and began production on March 30, 2007. The video had a 'First Look' on MTV's TRL on May 16, 2007, and peaked at #5 on May 24, 2007. The video topped VH1's Top 40 Videos of 2007 list. Milo Ventimiglia plays Fergie's love interest.

The video begins with Fergie getting out of her car (a red 1969 Mustang fastback) and going inside a warehouse where she meets her band and practices. Meanwhile, she is seen singing next to her boyfriend, who is sleeping. She starts walking through the house, and is then watching herself and her boyfriend from a different point of view getting out of her car. They enter the house, and her boyfriend gets out a guitar and starts playing, while Fergie is singing. Later on, she sees her boyfriend out the window with several men, one of whom passes him a small package, which is presumably drugs, and it upsets her.

Fergie then starts singing the chorus while she is taking her clothes off a clothes line and putting them into a suitcase. As the third verse begins, Fergie is walking around a warehouse singing while wearing a tan-gray baby doll dress. At the end of the song, she is seen getting into her car and driving down the road.

There are other music videos for this song. The one described above is labeled as the "Personal" version; it is approximately five minutes in length and the song is played once. There is also the so-called "extended" version; it is approximately nine minutes in length and the song is played twice. It begins with Fergie driving to the warehouse, then uses flashbacks which include the plot scenes run in sequence. At the conclusion of this first playing of the song, Fergie has arrived at the warehouse and, with her band, the song is played again, this time with all of the warehouse scenes run in sequence.

== Track listings ==
- US remix download single
1. "Big Girls Don't Cry (Personal)" (remix featuring Sean Kingston) – 3:53
- UK, European, and Australian CD single
1. "Big Girls Don't Cry"
2. "Pedestal"
- European maxi-CD single
1. "Big Girls Don't Cry" – 4:28
2. "Pedestal" – 3:23
3. "Finally" (live) – 3:48
4. "Big Girls Don't Cry" (video)

== Personnel ==
Personnel are adapted from the liner notes of The Dutchess.

Recording

- Recorded at the Metropolis Recording Studio in London, England
- Strings recorded at Signet Sound
- Mixed Ocean Way Recordings in Hollywood, California

Personnel

- Songwriting – Stacy Ferguson, Toby Gad
- Production – will.i.am
- Bass and drum programming – will.i.am
- Basses – Trey Henry, Mike Valerio
- Drums, keyboard bass, keys – Keith Harris
- String arrangement and conductor – Ron Fair
- Violins – Bruce Dukov, Natalie Leggett, Charlie Bisharat, Sarah Thornblade, Julie Gigante, Josefina Vergara, Sid Page, Roberto Cani, Anatoly Rosinsky, Liane Mautner, Barbra Porter, Darius Campo, Helen Nigthengale, Tiffany Hu, Becky Bunnell, Shoshana Claman, Lisa Sutton, Armen Annasian
- Violas – Brian Dembo, Matt Funes, Thomas Diener, Andrew Duckles
- Celli – Cecilia Tsan, Larry Corbett, David Low, Suzie Katayma
- Engineering – will.i.am, Neil Tucker, Tal Herzberg
- Pro Tools – Tal Herzberg
- Guitars – George Pajon Jr.
- Mixing – Jack Joseph Puig, Dean Nelson (assistant)

== Charts ==
=== Weekly charts ===
Chart (2007–2008)	Peak position
Australia (ARIA)	1
Australian Urban (ARIA)	1
Brazil Hot 100 Airplay (Billboard Brasil)	1
Austria (Ö3 Austria Top 40)	1
Belgium (Ultratop 50 Flanders)	6
Belgium (Ultratop 50 Wallonia)	27
Brazil (Crowley Broadcast Analysis)	2
Canada Hot 100 (Billboard)	1
CIS Airplay (TopHit)	4
Croatia International Airplay (HRT)	2
Czech Republic Airplay (ČNS IFPI)	1
Denmark (Tracklisten)	4
Europe (Eurochart Hot 100)	3
Finland (Suomen virallinen lista)	10
France (SNEP)	11
Germany (GfK)	6
Germany Airplay (BVMI)	1
Hungary (Rádiós Top 40)	1
Ireland (IRMA)	1
Italy (FIMI)	38
Mexico (Top 20 – Inglés)	3
Netherlands (Dutch Top 40)	3
Netherlands (Single Top 100)	4
New Zealand (Recorded Music NZ)	1
Norway (VG-lista)	1
Poland (Polish Airplay Charts)	1
Portugal Digital Songs Sales (Billboard)	3
Romania (Romanian Top 100)	1
Russia Airplay (TopHit)	3
Scottish Singles Sales (Official Charts)	2
Slovakia Airplay (ČNS IFPI)	1
Sweden (Sverigetopplistan)	4
Switzerland (Schweizer Hitparade)	3
Ukraine Airplay (TopHit)	34
UK Singles (Official Charts)	2
UK Hip Hop/R&B (Official Charts)	1
US Billboard Hot 100	1
US Adult Pop Airplay (Billboard)	1
US Adult Contemporary (Billboard)	1
US Pop Airplay (Billboard)	1
US Rhythmic Airplay (Billboard)	10
Venezuela Pop Rock (Record Report)	2

=== Year-end charts ===
Chart (2007)	Position
Australia (ARIA)	1
Australian Urban (ARIA)	1
Austria (Ö3 Austria Top 40)	12
Belgium (Ultratop 50 Flanders)	25
Brazil (Crowley Broadcast Analysis)	1
CIS Airplay (TopHit)	51
Europe (Eurochart Hot 100)	19
Germany (Media Control GfK)	22
Hungary (Rádiós Top 40)	27
Ireland (IRMA)	13
Netherlands (Dutch Top 40)	7
Netherlands (Single Top 100)	19
New Zealand (RIANZ)	2
Romania (Romanian Top 100)	4
Russia Airplay (TopHit)	45
Sweden (Sverigetopplistan)	31
Switzerland (Schweizer Hitparade)	20
UK Singles (OCC)	21
US Billboard Hot 100	4
US Adult Contemporary (Billboard)	12
US Adult Top 40 (Billboard)	11

Chart (2008)	Position
Canada (Canadian Hot 100)	49
Canada AC (Billboard)	8
Hungary (Rádiós Top 40)	96
US Billboard Hot 100	78
US Adult Contemporary (Billboard)	5

=== Decade-end charts ===
Chart (2000–2009)	Position
Australia (ARIA)	44
Russia Airplay (TopHit)	198
US Billboard Hot 100	13

=== All-time charts ===
Chart (1958–2018)	Position
US Billboard Hot 100	115

== Certifications and sales ==
Region	Certification	Certified units/sales
Australia (ARIA)	5× Platinum	350,000^{^}
Brazil (Pro-Música Brasil) DMS	Platinum	60,000^{*}
Brazil (Pro-Música Brasil)	Diamond	250,000^{‡}
Canada	—	87,000
Denmark (IFPI Danmark)	Platinum	15,000^{^}
Germany (BVMI)	Gold	150,000^{‡}
Japan (RIAJ)	Gold	100,000^{*}
New Zealand (RMNZ)	4× Platinum	120,000^{‡}
Norway (IFPI Norway)	Gold	5,000^{*}
Sweden (GLF)	Gold	10,000^{^}
United Kingdom (BPI)	2× Platinum	1,200,000^{‡}
United States (RIAA)	4× Platinum	4,000,000^{‡}
United States (RIAA) Mastertone	Platinum	1,000,000^{*}
^{*} Sales figures based on certification alone.^{^} Shipments figures based on certification alone.^{‡} Sales+streaming figures based on certification alone.

== Release history ==
Release dates and formats for "Big Girls Don't Cry"
Region	Date	Format(s)	Version(s)	Label(s)	Ref.
United States	May 22, 2007	Contemporary hit radio	Original	A&M; Interscope; will.i.am	
Germany	July 6, 2007	CD; maxi CD	Original	Universal	
Australia	July 7, 2007	CD	Original	Universal	
United Kingdom	July 9, 2007	CD	Original	Polydor	
Belgium	July 10, 2007	CD	Original	Polydor	
France	October 8, 2007	CD	Original	Polydor	
United States	October 9, 2007	Digital download	Remix	A&M; will.i.am	

== See also ==
- List of number-one singles of 2007 (Australia)
- List of number-one hits of 2007 (Austria)
- List of Hot 100 number-one singles of 2007 (Canada)
- List of number-one singles of 2007 (Ireland)
- List of number-one singles from the 2000s (New Zealand)
- List of Billboard Hot 100 number ones of 2007
- List of Billboard Mainstream Top 40 number-one songs of 2007
- List of Billboard Adult Contemporary number ones of 2007
- List of Romanian Top 100 number ones of the 2000s
