= London Bridge (Fergie song) =

2006 single by Fergie

Single by Fergie

from the album The Dutchess
- Released: July 18, 2006
- Recorded: 2006
- Studio: Chalice (Los Angeles); Hit Factory Criteria (Miami)
- Genre: Pop rap
- Length: 4:01 (album version); 3:28 (single version)
- Label: A&M; Interscope; will.i.am
- Songwriters: Stacy Ferguson; Jamal Jones; Sean Garrett; Mike Hartnett
- Producer: Polow da Don

Fergie singles chronology
"London Bridge" (2006)	"Fergalicious" (2006)

Alternative cover
- One-track digital single cover

Music video
- "London Bridge" on YouTube

"London Bridge" is the debut solo single by American singer and songwriter Fergie for her debut studio album The Dutchess (2006). It was written by Fergie, Mike Hartnett, Sean Garrett, and its sole producer Polow da Don. A pop rap song, it contains compositional samples of "Down to the Nightclub", performed by Tower of Power. It was released as the lead single from The Dutchess on July 18, 2006, by A&M Records, Interscope Records and will.i.am Music Group.

Music critics gave "London Bridge" generally mixed reviews, with some of them criticizing the song's sexually suggestive lyrics and comparing the song to Gwen Stefani's single "Hollaback Girl" (2005). "London Bridge" was a commercial success and reached the top ten in 13 countries. In the United States, it peaked at number one on the Billboard Hot 100 chart and was certified platinum by the Recording Industry Association of America (RIAA), selling over two million digital copies and becoming the singer's second best-selling song in the country.

An accompanying music video for the single, also released in 2006, was directed by Marc Webb and features Fergie playing around with men in London. A second music video was filmed and released in 2025. The song was featured in the 2014 film Neighbors and appears on the film's soundtrack.

== Writing and production ==
Stacy Ferguson, Sean Garrett and Mike Hartnett wrote "London Bridge" together with Polow da Don, who produced the song. The song contains a compositional sample of "Down to the Nightclub" by Tower of Power. It was recorded at the Chalice Recording Studios in Los Angeles, California and at the Hit Factory Criteria in Miami, Florida.

Polow da Don provided background vocals with Jay Anderson, who also provided additional vocals to the song. Hartnett played the bass and guitar, while Danja played the drums and percussion. The keys for the song were provided by Elvis Williams, while engineering was handled by Demacio "Demo" Castellon and Jason Schweitzer. Phil Tan worked with Josh Houghkirk on mixing the song at the Soapbox Studios in Atlanta, Georgia.

== Music and lyrics ==
"London Bridge" incorporates the use of horns. According to the sheet music published by Windswept Holdings, LLC at Musicnotes.com, it was composed in the key of F minor. The song is set in common time to a moderate hip hop groove of 90 beats per minute. Fergie's vocal range spans from the low note of E_{4} to the high note of F_{5}. Fergie described the song as being "kind of like a punch in the face to let people know I'm coming out" She also said the song was "poking fun at certain things. I'm really not going to spray the paparazzi with mace—I don't know if you know that about me."

IGN writer Spence D. labeled "London Bridge" a "club stomper", while Rebecca Wright of Blogcritics described the song as a catchy and danceable tune with lyrics which are hard to decipher. John Murphy of musicOMH claimed that the song also incorporates the use of horns similar to those used by Beyoncé in her song "Work It Out" (2002). Mike Joseph of PopMatters compared the song to Gwen Stefani's "Hollaback Girl", Nelly Furtado's "Promiscuous", and the Black Eyed Peas' "My Humps". Joseph also said that the song is a mixture of Stefani's "schoolgirl sass" and "a bit of ambiguous sleaze".

== Critical reception ==
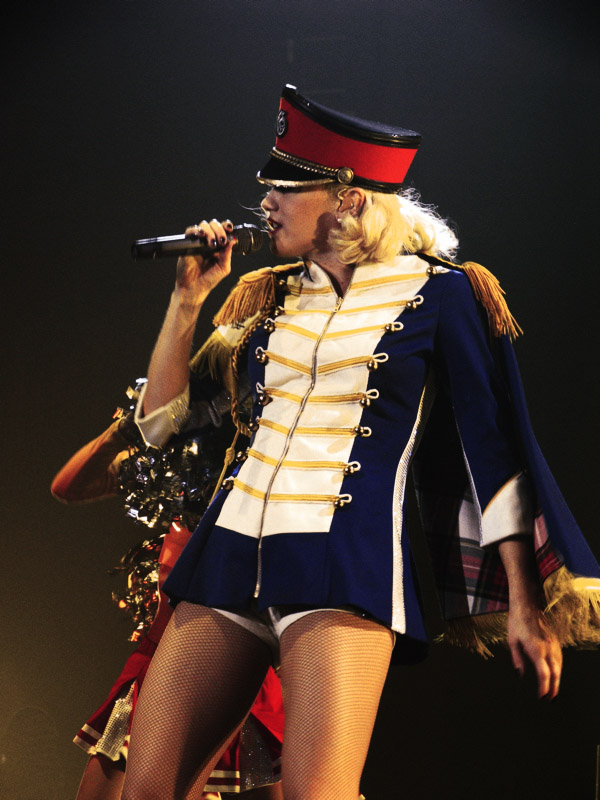
"London Bridge"'s composition drew comparisons to Gwen Stefani's (pictured) "Hollaback Girl".

Upon its release, "London Bridge" received mixed reviews from music critics. Rolling Stone called the song a "total ripoff of Hollaback Girl", Gwen Stefani's 2005 number-one single. A reviewer of About.com described the song as being "Hollaback Girl" "slathered in puerile sexual raunch". Steve Yates of The Observer describes the song as being "much in the M.I.A. vein". Amy Phillips of Pitchfork noted how much the song and Lil Mama's "Lip Gloss" resembled M.I.A.'s songs, such as her 2003 single "Galang", serving as a reminder of how much the mainstream pop, dance and rap musical landscape had shifted since M.I.A. "first appeared in 2004". (Note: After hearing "London Bridge", M.I.A. told Interscope Geffen A&M Records then-chairman Jimmy Iovine: "If I don't sell records and make money for you, you're just going to make them with her anyway". However, Iovine noted that the song was yet another example of how M.I.A. was "an artist who inspires other artists.") AllMusic writer Andy Kellman selected "London Bridge" as one of the best tracks from The Dutchess, describing it as "terrific" and "inexplicably asinine".

Leah Greenblatt of Entertainment Weekly wrote that Fergie played the role of a sexaholic superstar, especially on the refrain, where she "unsubtly, if memorably", combined "winky" sexual metaphors and "club-banging" beats. Bill Lamb of About.com rated the song two out of five stars, praising the spirit exuded, claiming it resembled that of "Hollaback Girl". However, he labeled "London Bridge" as a derivative of higher quality pop music and criticized it for its explicit sexual lyrics. Benjamin Boles of Now expressed dislike for the song: "Basically, if London Bridge doesn't make you want to rip your ears off, you'll enjoy almost 80 per cent of the album." Sal Cinquemani of Slant Magazine also expressed dislike for the song's sexual suggestiveness, writing that it was "the most uninspired metaphor for oral sex in recorded history."

Norman Mayers of Prefix Magazine labeled "London Bridge" as one of the album's highlights. Dan Gennoe of Yahoo! Music compared the song to Gwen Stefani, writing that the "raucous thump has Gwen Stefani stamped all over it." Spence D. of IGN labeled "London Bridge" the album's centerpice, but noted that, compared to "Fergalicious" and "Clumsy", it appeared to be "a calculated banger aimed at the unscrupulous club goer." John Murphy of musicOMH found the song annoying, "nothing more, nothing less", but predicted that it would be a commercial success. Heather Murray of Glasswerk.co.uk criticized the song for its lyrics, lack of originality, and Fergie's vocal performance, which she described as "whinely drawl."

== Commercial performance ==
In the United States, "London Bridge" entered the Billboard Hot 100 at number 84 on the issue dated August 5, 2006. The song ascended 79 places to number five the next week, achieving the second biggest leap in the Billboard Hot 100 history at the time. It ascended to number one in its third week and stayed there for three consecutive weeks. The song was certified platinum by the Recording Industry Association of America (RIAA) on July 11, 2007, almost a year after its release. Its digital download sales stand at 2,115,000 units, becoming her first single to surpass sales of two million downloads. "London Bridge" is Fergie's fifth most-downloaded song, behind "Big Girls Don't Cry", "Fergalicious", "Glamorous", and "Clumsy".

In Australia, the song debuted and peaked at number three on the ARIA Singles Chart dated September 24, 2006, staying at the position for two non-consecutive weeks. The song has been certified gold by the Australian Recording Industry Association (ARIA) for sales of 35,000 units. On the issue dated October 2, the song debuted and peaked atop the New Zealand Singles Chart. Across Europe, "London Bridge" peaked at number three in Denmark, Germany and the United Kingdom. In Switzerland, the song peaked at number six, where it stayed for two non-consecutive weeks and spent a total of 18 weeks on the chart. In France, the song debuted and peaked at number 27 on October 28, spending a total of 18 weeks on the singles chart.

== Music videos ==
The accompanying music video for "London Bridge", directed by Marc Webb, was filmed at Woolwich Barracks, South London in mid-June 2006, during the Black Eyed Peas' The Monkey Business Tour stop in the United Kingdom. Fergie collaborated with her fellow group members will.i.am, Taboo and apl.de.ap on the concept and all three appear in cameos in the video. She described the concept: "We're doing this androgynous-type thing where my girls and I go into a Gentlemen's club and pull them into a bathroom and come back out in their clothes. They're going to be dressed up really dapper and looking really handsome."

For the video Fergie brought in backup dancers who doubled as bodyguards, dressed as cholas—tough Mexican girls known for wearing dark lipstick and big hair—to make the video "have a bit more edge, be very distinct, be very mixed." Fergie is seen intermittently sailing down the River Thames in front of Tower Bridge, not London Bridge as in the song's title. Fergie based one of her outfits for the video on her family's crest and tartan, modernize it somewhat. She also wears a tiara cocked to the side of her head, a play on the royal title of her album and her having the same nickname as Sarah, Duchess of York. A decade after its original premiere, the music video was uploaded to Fergie's Vevo channel on August 4, 2016.

In July 2025, Fergie filmed a second "London Bridge" music video for Too Much, which takes place at the London Bridge and features Megan Stalter. Fergie said that, despite being on hiatus, "I loved this idea, and I loved—especially at this time in my life—just being a little bit messier, a little bit goofier, and just having fun with life."

== Track listings and formats ==
- Digital download (explicit)
1. "London Bridge" (dirty version) — 3:28
- Digital download (clean)
1. "London Bridge" (radio edit) (Note: Radio edit of "London Bridge" was subtitled "Oh Snap" on numerous editions of the single.) — 3:28
- 2-track digital download
1. "London Bridge" (dirty version) — 3:29
2. "London Bridge" (instrumental) — 3:25
- Digital EP
1. "London Bridge" (dirty version) — 3:29
2. "London Bridge" (instrumental) — 3:25
3. "London Bridge" (a cappella) — 3:16
- European 2-track CD single
1. "London Bridge" (LP version) — 3:28
2. "London Bridge" (instrumental) — 3:25
- Australian and European CD maxi-single
1. "London Bridge" (LP version) — 3:28
2. "London Bridge" (instrumental) — 3:25
3. "London Bridge" (a cappella) — 3:15
4. "London Bridge" (music video) — 3:32
- US 12-inch vinyl
1. "London Bridge" (dirty version) — 3:28
2. "London Bridge" (a cappella) — 3:15
3. "London Bridge" (radio edit) — 3:28
4. "London Bridge" (instrumental) — 3:25

== Credits and personnel ==
Credits adapted from the liner notes of The Dutchess.

Sample credits

- Contains elements from the composition "Down to the Night Club" by Tower of Power

Recording

- Recorded at the Chalice Recording Studios in Los Angeles, and at the Hit Factory Criteria in Miami
- Mixed at the Soapbox Studios in Atlanta

Personnel

- Demacio "Demo" Castellon – engineering
- Danja – drums, percussion
- Stacy Ferguson – songwriting, vocals
- Sean Garrett – songwriting
- Mike Hartnett – bass, guitar, songwriting
- Josh Houghkirk – mixing assistance
- Polow da Don – production, songwriting
- Jason Schweitzer – engineering
- Phil Tan – mixing
- Elvis Williams – keys

== Charts ==
=== Weekly charts ===
Chart (2006–2007)	Peak position
Australia (ARIA)	3
Australian Urban (ARIA)	1
Austria (Ö3 Austria Top 40)	3
Belgium (Ultratop 50 Flanders)	14
Belgium (Ultratop 50 Wallonia)	16
Canada (Nielsen SoundScan)	2
CIS Airplay (TopHit)	35
Croatia (HRT)	3
Czech Republic Airplay (ČNS IFPI)	7
Denmark (Tracklisten)	3
European Hot 100 Singles (Billboard)	4
Finland (Suomen virallinen lista)	9
France (SNEP)	27
Germany (GfK)	3
Greece (IFPI)	9
Hungary (Dance Top 40)	25
Ireland (IRMA)	8
Italy (FIMI)	4
Netherlands (Dutch Top 40)	31
Netherlands (Single Top 100)	28
New Zealand (Recorded Music NZ)	1
Norway (VG-lista)	2
Russia Airplay (TopHit)	53
Scottish Singles Sales (Official Charts)	3
Slovakia Airplay (ČNS IFPI)	13
Sweden (Sverigetopplistan)	13
Switzerland (Schweizer Hitparade)	6
UK Singles (Official Charts)	3
UK Hip Hop/R&B (Official Charts)	2
US Billboard Hot 100	1
US Hot R&B/Hip-Hop Songs (Billboard)	56
US Pop Airplay (Billboard)	4
US Rhythmic Airplay (Billboard)	15

=== Year-end charts ===
Chart (2006)	Position
Australia (ARIA)	27
Austria (Ö3 Austria Top 40)	62
Belgium (Ultratop 50 Flanders)	91
Brazil (Crowley)	16
CIS (TopHit)	172
European Hot 100 Singles (Billboard)	40
Germany (Media Control GfK)	52
Sweden (Hitlistan)	85
Switzerland (Schweizer Hitparade)	74
UK Singles (OCC)	108
UK Urban (Music Week)	24
US Billboard Hot 100	22

Chart (2007)	Position
Brazil (Crowley)	29

== Certifications ==
Region	Certification	Certified units/sales
Australia (ARIA)	Platinum	70,000^{^}
Brazil (Pro-Música Brasil) DMS	Platinum	60,000^{*}
Brazil (Pro-Música Brasil)	Diamond	250,000^{‡}
Denmark (IFPI Danmark)	Gold	4,000^{^}
Japan (RIAJ) Full-length ringtone	Gold	100,000^{*}
Japan (RIAJ) Ringtone	2× Platinum	500,000^{*}
New Zealand (RMNZ)	Platinum	30,000^{‡}
United Kingdom (BPI)	Silver	200,000^{‡}
United States (RIAA)	2× Platinum	2,000,000^{‡}
United States (RIAA) Mastertone	Platinum	1,000,000^{*}
^{*} Sales figures based on certification alone.^{^} Shipments figures based on certification alone.^{‡} Sales+streaming figures based on certification alone.

== Release history ==
Release dates and formats for "London Bridge"
Region	Date	Format(s)	Label(s)	Ref.
United States	July 18, 2006	Contemporary hit radio; digital download; digital download (EP); rhythmic contemporary radio	A&M; Interscope; will.i.am (Note: will.i.am Music Group released only the commercial single for "London Bridge" and did not participate in sending the song to radio stations.)	
France	August 14, 2006	Digital download	Polydor	
Italy	August 14, 2006	Digital download	Universal Music	
Spain	August 14, 2006	Digital download	Universal Music	
Germany	September 1, 2006	Digital download; digital download (EP)	Universal Music	
United Kingdom	September 4, 2006	Digital download	Polydor	
Germany	September 8, 2006	CD; maxi CD	Universal Music	
Australia	September 11, 2006	Maxi CD	Universal Music	
France	September 11, 2006	Digital download (2-track); digital download (EP)	Polydor	
United Kingdom	September 11, 2006	CD; digital download (2-track)	Polydor	
United States	September 19, 2006	12-inch vinyl	A&M; Interscope; will.i.am	
France	October 23, 2006	CD	Polydor	

== See also ==
- List of Billboard Hot 100 number-one singles of 2006
- List of number-one singles from the 2000s (New Zealand)
