= Finally (Fergie song) =

Single by Fergie featuring John Legend

from the album The Dutchess
- Released: February 24, 2008
- Studio: Chung King (New York City); Conway (Los Angeles)
- Length: 4:53 (album version); 3:45 (radio edit)
- Label: A&M; Interscope; will.i.am
- Songwriters: John Stephens; Stacy Ferguson; Stefanie Ridel
- Producers: John Legend; Ron Fair

Fergie singles chronology
"Party People" (2008)	"Finally" (2008)	"Labels or Love" (2008)

John Legend singles chronology
"Stereo" (2007)	"Finally" (2008)	"Green Light" (2008)

Audio
- "Finally" on YouTube

"Finally" is a song recorded by American singer Fergie for her debut studio album The Dutchess (2006). It was written by Fergie, Stefanie Ridel, and John Legend, with Legend producing the track alongside Ron Fair. The song was released as the sixth and final single from The Dutchess on February 24, 2008, by A&M Records, Interscope Records and will.i.am Music Group.

== Background and promotion ==
A music video for "Finally" was shot by director Marc Webb, but never released – it was canceled in post-production without explanation. The video shoot took place at the former Hollywood Hills home of Frank Sinatra and featured several male models from Wilhelmina Models as part of the shoot.

== Writing and production ==
"Finally" was written by John Stephens (John Legend), Stacy Ferguson (Fergie) and Stefanie Ridel. The song was produced by John Legend and Ron Fair. Ridel and Fair produced Fergie's vocals, which were recorded at Chung King Recording Studios in New York City and Conway Recording Studios in Hollywood. The strings were arranged and conducted by Fair and recorded by Allen Sides at Signet Sound in West Hollywood, California. Anatoly Rosinsky, Bruce Dukov, Helen Nightengale, Josefina Vergara, Julie Gigante, Liane Mautner, Natalie Leggett, Becky Bunnell, Roberto Cani, Sarah Thornblade, Shoshana Claman, Sid Page, Tiffany Hu, Katia Popov, Michele Richards, Phillip Levy, Songa Lee and Tammy Hatwan performed the strings for "Finally".

The viola was performed by Andrew Duckles, Brian Dembow, Thomas Diener and Vicky Misckolczy, while the cello was performed by David Low, Larry Corbett, Suzie Katayama and Tim Loo. Nico Abondolo and Mike Valerio performed the bass in the song, while John Legend performed the piano. Additional Pro Tools editing was done by Tal Herzberg. The song was engineered by Josh Chervokas and "Angry" Mike Eleopoulos, with assistance from Anthony Caruso and Bevin Robinson. The song was mixed by Sides.

== Composition and critical response ==
"Finally" is a "bombastic ballad", set to the style of Broadway theatre. It features a "dramatic piano" and "string-laden" coda. The song is set in common time composed in a moderate tempo of 84 beats per minute, with a main key of C major with a vocal range from the tone of G_{3} to the note of E_{5}. Fergie "gets introspective" and "lets loose" about her past troubles and dreams in the song. According to Bill Lamb of About.com, Fergie "blows the listener away" with "Finally", a track that is "truly huge".

"Finally", according to Spence D. of IGN, would "on paper" seem to be a "flop", "just like her other attempts at serious sounding tunes" on The Dutchess. He, however, stated that the song "actually works", mostly because Fergie "lets loose with her voice", showing that she has range and a "nice, warm set of pipes". He concluded by stating that while the song "may be at odds with her bangin' club persona", it is a "rich, introspective number" that showcases Fergie's "maturity and sincerity rather nicely". According to a reviewer from Alloy, Fergie shines "without a trace" of hip hop, reggae, or rap, which proves that she does not need sexual lyrics or synth-produced dance beats to "show off her pipes". That same reviewer wrote that "Finally" is "the biggest surprise" on The Dutchess.

Leah Greenblatt of Entertainment Weekly wrote that Fergie's "ardent joy" on "Finally" is probably as "publicly naked as she's ever allowed herself to be". She wrote that "not that she's morphing into some kind of "My Heart Will Go On" ballad queen; Fergie is too adept on the dance floor to forsake it." While giving a negative review of The Dutchess, Mike Joseph of PopMatters wrote that Fergie "shows hints of promise" in "Finally". According to Kelefa Sanneh of The New York Times, the song "may one day conquer radio".

== Live performances ==
Fergie and Legend performed the song together at the 50th Grammy Awards. Fergie performed the track multiple times on television, most notably on 2008's Dick Clark's New Year's Rockin' Eve and The Tyra Banks Show. Fergie performed the song with John Legend at the Idol Gives Back show on Wednesday, April 9, 2008. Fergie has also performed the song in an episode of Nickelodeon's "Dance on Sunset".

== Charts ==
Weekly chart performance for "Finally"
Chart (2008–2010)	Peak position
Canada Hot 100 (Billboard)	61
South Korea International (Gaon)	189
US Bubbling Under Hot 100 (Billboard)	1
US Pop Airplay (Billboard)	34
US Pop 100 (Billboard)	67

== Release history ==
Release dates and formats for "Finally"
Region	Date	Format(s)	Label(s)	Ref.
United States	February 24, 2008	Contemporary hit radio	A&M; Interscope; will.i.am	
United States	March 18, 2008	Digital download	A&M; Interscope; will.i.am	
