= Labels or Love =

Promotional single by Fergie

from the album Sex and the City and The Dutchess
- Released: May 30, 2008
- Recorded: 2008
- Genre: Dance-pop; R&B
- Length: 3:52
- Label: A&M
- Songwriters: Fergie; Douglas J. Cuomo; Rico Love; Salaam Remi
- Producer: Salaam Remi

Audio video
- "Labels Or Love" on YouTube

"Labels or Love" is a single by American singer-songwriter Fergie from the soundtrack for the motion picture Sex and the City (2008).

== Background ==
The song samples parts of the Sex and the City theme song. The song was released in Brazil on May 4, 2008, after an exclusive premiere on Jovem Pan FM, one of the major radio stations in Brazil. The song was officially sent to US and Australian radios on June 3, 2008. The song debuted at number 28 on the Australian ARIA Singles Chart, and in its second week ascended into the top 20 and has peaked at number 15. In the UK, the single peaked only at number 56. The song was nominated for the People's Choice Awards for "Favorite Song From a Soundtrack", but lost to Mamma Mia! by Meryl Streep. A music video for the single was never issued owing to the song's poor performance. Currently the song's instrumental serves as the opening theme for South Korean cosmetic surgery series "Let Me In".

== Charts ==
| Chart (2008) | Peak position |
|---|---|
| Australia (ARIA) | 15 |
| Austria (Ö3 Austria Top 40) | 53 |
| Canada Hot 100 (Billboard) | 28 |
| Czech Republic (Singles Digitál Top 100) | 54 |
| Ireland (IRMA) | 28 |
| Japan (Japan Hot 100) | 61 |
| Switzerland (Schweizer Hitparade) | 69 |
| Turkey (Turkey Top 20 Chart) | 18 |
| UK Singles (OCC) | 56 |
| US Pop 100 (Billboard) | 89 |

== Certifications ==
| Region | Certification | Certified units/sales |
|---|---|---|
| Japan (RIAJ) | Gold | 100,000^{*} |
^{*} Sales figures based on certification alone.
