= John Lennon Educational Tour Bus =

American non-profit organization

The John Lennon Educational Tour Bus ("Lennon Bus") was founded in 1998 as a non-profit 501(c)(3) "committed to reaching youth through music and video". The work is carried out through a traveling bus, which serves as a mobile audio and video recording studio.

The bus stops at K–12 schools, universities, Boys and Girls Clubs, concerts, music festivals, and other events and locations. At most stops, the staff offers free tours and an opportunity for the youths to record original songs and videos. At some of its school visits, the bus organizes a Battle of the Bands in which the winning band receive prizes. The bus co-produced a course with the Digital Media Academy that is offered at several universities each summer, called "Come Together: Music and Video Production."

Various artists such as will.i.am, Natasha Bedingfield and Justin Timberlake have had various levels of involvement with the Lennon Bus, such as recording on the bus and participating in outreach programs. The bus has accompanied The Black Eyed Peas' guitarist George Pajon and musical director Printz on their concert tours.

In 2006, Edutopia, The George Lucas Educational Foundation, featured the John Lennon Educational Tour Bus on Edutopia.org. Edutopia's video, "Making the Dreams of Young Musical Artists a Reality", and article, "Rock and Roll into Town: Students Make Tracks in a Recording Studio on Wheels", follow the buses progress and interview executive director Brian Rothschild. The article and video also showcase the student music.

Each Lennon Bus has a crew of 3 producer/engineers that works intensely with local youth; making music, teaching digital media production, creating original content, and giving voice to the often unheard stories and perspective of people from all walks of life.
