= Glamorous (song) =

2007 single by Fergie featuring Ludacris

Single by Fergie featuring Ludacris

from the album The Dutchess
- B-side: "True"
- Released: January 23, 2007
- Recorded: 2006
- Studio: Tree Sound Studios (Atlanta, GA); Record Plant (Los Angeles, CA)
- Genre: R&B; pop; pop rap
- Length: 4:08
- Label: A&M; will.i.am; Interscope
- Songwriters: Stacy Ferguson; Jamal Jones; William Adams; Elvis Williams; Christopher Bridges
- Producer: Polow da Don

Fergie singles chronology
"Fergalicious" (2006)	"Glamorous" (2007)	"Big Girls Don't Cry" (2007)

Ludacris singles chronology
"Grew Up a Screw Up" (2006)	"Glamorous" (2007)	"Runaway Love" (2007)

Music video
- "Glamorous" on YouTube

"Glamorous" is a song recorded by American singer Fergie, featuring American rapper Ludacris, released on January 23, 2007, through A&M Records, will.i.am Music Group and Interscope Records. It was written by Fergie, Ludacris, will.i.am, Elvis Williams and Polow da Don for her debut studio album The Dutchess (2006). An airy R&B and pop song that its lyrics center on Fergie staying rooted despite her success and fame of glamour.

Music critics praised the song's flow and production but, were divided on its lyrical content. "Glamorous" achieved commercial success worldwide, topping the Billboard Hot 100 and reaching the top ten in several countries. It also became Fergie's third best-selling song in the United States, earning a double platinum certification from the Recording Industry Association of America (RIAA). An accompanying music video directed by Dave Meyers features Fergie, her fellow members of the Black Eyed Peas, and Ludacris.

"Glamorous" experienced a resurgence in 2022, when rapper Jack Harlow sampled the song for his single "First Class", which also topped the Billboard Hot 100, amongst other charts.

== Recording ==
"Glamorous" was written by the artists alongside will.i.am, Elvis Williams and producer Polow da Don. will.i.am, was in charge of the song's arrangement while Ron Fair produced the additional vocals present on the track. The song features co-writer Williams, who provided the keys and Mike Hartnett, who played the guitars. The technical work performed on "Glamorous" includes engineering, which was orchestrated principally by Travis Daniels and was assisted by Mack Woodward. Tal Herzberg, who has worked the Black Eyed Peas on previous studio recordings, performed additional engineering on the track with the use of Pro Tools. Tony Maserati was signed as the principal mix engineer while Ryan Kennedy assisted him at The Record Plant in Hollywood, California. The song was finally recorded at Tree Sound Studios in Atlanta, Georgia and The Record Plant in Hollywood, California by "Angry" Mike Eleopoulos.

== Composition ==
"Glamorous (featuring Ludacris)"
A 22-second sample of "Glamorous", a smooth pop song that has received comparisons to musical works by Gwen Stefani and Jennifer Lopez.

"Glamorous" is a downtempo R&B and pop song that has a smooth, silky feel and contains elements of techno. According to Dan Gennoe of Yahoo! Music, the song is comparable to the music of Janet Jackson. Spence D. of IGN noted that the song contained a mid-1980s vibe and influences of musical works by Madonna and Prince. Critics also likened the song to Gwen Stefani's "Luxurious" and Jennifer Lopez's "Jenny from the Block".

According to the digital music sheet published at Musicnotes.com by EMI Music Publishing, the song was written in a key of C major. Having a beat measure of 130 beats per minute, it is set in common time and moves through a moderately fast tempo. The vocals range from a low register of E_{3} to a high register of C_{5}. It has a basic sequence of G-Am7-Fmaj7 as its chord progression. Lyrically, "Glamorous" is an autobiographical account about how Fergie has remained true to her background, despite widespread fame and mainstream success. It also samples “If You Ain't Got No Money” by Raheem the Dream.

== Release ==
"Glamorous" was released as the third single from The Dutchess (2006), after "London Bridge" and "Fergalicious". A&M Records, together with will.i.am Music Group and Interscope Records, solicited the song to mainstream radios on January 23, 2007, and to Rhythmic radios on February 20, 2007, in the United States. It was later released as a single around the world on March 16, 2007, as a CD single.

== Music video ==
Directed by Dave Meyers, and shot in an anamorphic 1.85:1 widescreen aspect ratio, the video, which had its world premiere on MTV's TRL on February 7, 2007, begins in the year 1994 with Fergie and Polow da Don at a keg party in East Los Angeles before she was famous, with everyone at the party shouting "If you ain't got no money take yo broke ass home". The camera then rotates upward where it is present day and Fergie is lounging in a Gulfstream G550 business jet and as the chorus suggests, "flying first class, up in the sky". The captain is played by Freddy Rodriguez. She is seen watching the music video on her LG enV for her band's "Pump It". Fergie then lands and enters a limo waiting for her where she goes with her friends to a drive thru at a Taco Hall, as indicated by the takeout bag she collects, though the lyrics comment that this is Taco Bell instead. The video at this point does a transition to the past (1990s) where it is suggested Fergie came to this same restaurant with her friends before her glamorous life. The transition occurs as Fergie sings of the days when she had a Mustang. The limo transforms into a Mustang convertible. She and her friends are wearing fashion and have hairstyles similar to those of 1980s pop culture. The video then returns to present day where Fergie and Ludacris are shown shooting a film called Glamorous, a throwback to Bonnie and Clyde. The couple are shown holding Thompson submachine guns while being held up by police near a canyon, apparently for stealing money. Ludacris raps his verse to Fergie telling her all the expensive things he will buy for her. Fergie and Ludacris are then shown shooting down the cops, after which the film shoot ends. After the shoot, Fergie proceeds to sit in a chair with her name on it, as people rush over to do her makeup. While this is happening, she thanks her fans for making her famous. Scenes of this are intercut with Fergie getting back on the plane she came on, while she flashes back to when she was younger, where her father warned her about the coldness of show business. Fergie is then shown at the same kegger from earlier in the video, with her Black Eyed Peas bandmate apl.de.ap, Alfonso Ribeiro, Polow da Don, and B-Real from Cypress Hill with whom she clinks plastic glasses, followed with the plane she is on in the present day, flying into London as the sun sets.

== Critical reception ==
"Glamorous" received mixed to positive reviews from music critics. Bill Lamb of About.com gave "Glamorous" a three and a half star rating, praising the song's smooth R&B feel but dismissed its use of spelling out the title in the lyrics. Lamb also noted that "The frequent sparks of self-referential humor present in much of Fergie's music are missing here which limits the distinctiveness of this song" and explained it "veers a bit uncomfortably close" to Gwen Stefani's 2005 single "Luxurious" (Love. Angel. Music. Baby., 2004). He concluded his review, writing "unlikely to be a 3rd #1 for Fergie, and it may even struggle for top 10 status, but it is likely to linger as pleasant pop filler on the radio for the first few months of 2007." Spence D. of IGN called the song "somewhat generic", praising Fergie's flow and Ludacris' appearance on the track, but ultimately called it a "rather vapid exercise".

Liz Black of Cinema Blend called "Glamorous" "a stunning account of her ability to keep it real despite life in the first class." Kelefa Sanneh of New York Times wrote "Glamorous" and "Clumsy" to be songs fans can savor. Brian Rafferty of Idolator praised it as a "perfect No. 1 for a quarter when there ain’t shit else going on" and called Fergie's mid-song interjection of "fuck y'all" more convincing than the profanities present in RJD2's The Third Hand (2007), naming it the best gratuitous curse word in the top ten.

== Commercial performance ==
In the United States, "Glamorous" made its debut on the Billboard Hot 100 at number 98 on the issue dated January 27, 2007, while the previous single "Fergalicious" was still inside the top five. A month later, it rose to number nine, in that week becoming the "greatest digital gainer". In the following week, it fell to number 33 following the removal of the single from digital retailers. "Glamorous" returned in the top 10 after its re-release, rising from number 55, and peaked at number one on the issue dated March 24, 2007, selling 166,000 downloads during that week. It became her second number one single in the United States and held the top position for two weeks. The single spent 29 weeks on the Billboard Hot 100, 24 of which were in the top 50. The single went on to sell 3,012,000 digital downloads in the United States, enough to earn a double-platinum certification by the Recording Industry Association of America (RIAA). "Glamorous" stands as Fergie's third best-selling single behind "Big Girls Don't Cry" and "Fergalicious". The song was moderately successful on Billboard component charts Adult Pop Songs and Hot R&B/Hip-Hop Songs, while achieving chart topping success on Hot Dance Club Songs and reaching number two on Pop Songs. In Canada, the song reached number 12 on the Canadian Hot 100 and lasted 11 weeks on the chart.

The commercial reception of "Glamorous" in other countries was generally positive, with some countries matching the success experienced in the United States. In Australia, the song debuted at number 10 on the singles chart. It eventually rose to number two on May 28, 2007, being held off by Avril Lavigne's "Girlfriend". The song eventually left the chart after 26 weeks, selling 70,000 copies in the country and earned a platinum certification by the Australian Recording Industry Association (ARIA). On the 2007 end of the year charts, it ranked number 10 on the singles chart and number six on the urban chart. "Glamorous" entered the New Zealand Top 40, like in Australia, at number 10. The song ascended and come down within the top 20 for nine weeks, reaching number nine twice during that time. The song shipped over 7,500 copies to New Zealand, earning a gold certification by the Recording Industry Association of New Zealand. In the United Kingdom, the song made its first appearance on the singles chart on February 18, 2007, at number 56. It jumped to number 27 the next week and continued rising until its seventh week, when it peaked at number six. The song spent three weeks inside the top 10 and exited the chart after six months. According to The Official Charts Company, the song sold 205,000 copies in the United Kingdom. In Ireland, the song reached a peak position of number three in its seventh week like it did in the United Kingdom, but lasted in the top 10 longer (ten weeks).

== Remixes and samples ==
The song was heavily sampled by Jack Harlow for his 2022 single "First Class", which also peaked at number one on the Billboard Hot 100. Variety observed that "Glamorous" enjoyed a 70% increase in streams and 125% increase in digital song sales that year. Fergie later joined Harlow for a surprise performance at the 2022 MTV Video Music Awards. The New York Post called it one of the best performances of the night.

"Glamorous" was featured on the official soundtrack of the 2024 Marvel Cinematic Universe film Deadpool & Wolverine.

== Track listing ==
- UK CD single
1. "Glamorous" (album version) – 4:07
2. "True" (Spandau Ballet cover) – 3:45
- Europe CD1
1. "Glamorous" (album version) – 4:08
2. "Glamorous" (Space Cowboy Remix) – 4:37
- Europe CD2 & Australian CD single
1. "Glamorous" (album version) – 4:08
2. "Glamorous" (Space Cowboy Remix) – 4:37
3. "True" (Spandau Ballet cover) – 3:48
4. "Glamorous" (music video) – 4:10

== Personnel ==
Personnel are adapted from the liner notes of The Dutchess, A&M Records, Will.i.am Music Group, Interscope Records.

- Stacy Ferguson, Jamal Jones, Will Adams, Elvis Williams – songwriting
- Polow da Don – production, drum programming
- will.i.am – arrangement
- Ron Fair – additional vocal production
- Elvis Williams – keyboards
- Mike Hartnett – guitar
- Travis Daniels – engineering
- Mack Woodward – assistant engineering
- Tal Herzberg – Pro Tools engineering
- Tony Maserati – mixing
- Ryan Kennedy – assistant engineering
- "Angry" Mike Eleopoulos – recording

== Charts ==
=== Weekly charts ===
Weekly chart performance for "Glamorous"
Chart (2007)	Peak position
Australia (ARIA)	2
Australian Urban (ARIA)	1
Austria (Ö3 Austria Top 40)	25
Belgium (Ultratop 50 Flanders)	14
Belgium (Ultratop 50 Wallonia)	19
Canada Hot 100 (Billboard)	12
CIS Airplay (TopHit)	13
Croatia (HRT)	10
Czech Republic Airplay (ČNS IFPI)	22
Denmark (Tracklisten)	23
Europe (Eurochart Hot 100)	14
Finland (Suomen virallinen lista)	7
France (SNEP)	32
Germany (GfK)	16
Hungary (Rádiós Top 40)	2
Ireland (IRMA)	3
Netherlands (Dutch Top 40 Tipparade)	2
Netherlands (Single Top 100)	60
New Zealand (Recorded Music NZ)	9
Russia Airplay (TopHit)	14
Scottish Singles Sales (Official Charts)	11
Slovakia Airplay (ČNS IFPI)	5
Switzerland (Schweizer Hitparade)	38
UK Singles (Official Charts)	6
UK Hip Hop/R&B (Official Charts)	1
US Billboard Hot 100	1
US Adult Pop Airplay (Billboard)	24
US Dance Club Songs (Billboard)	1
US Hot R&B/Hip-Hop Songs (Billboard)	41
US Pop Airplay (Billboard)	2
US Rhythmic Airplay (Billboard)	3

=== Year-end charts ===
Year-end chart performance for "Glamorous"
Chart (2007)	Position
Australia (ARIA)	13
Belgium (Ultratop 50 Flanders)	71
Belgium (Ultratop 50 Wallonia)	83
CIS (TopHit)	69
Europe (Eurochart Hot 100)	69
Germany (Media Control GfK)	99
Hungary (Rádiós Top 40)	34
New Zealand (RIANZ)	33
Russia Airplay (TopHit)	97
UK Singles (OCC)	33
UK Urban (Music Week)	11
US Billboard Hot 100	10
US Dance Club Play (Billboard)	31
US Rhythmic Airplay (Billboard)	34

== Certifications ==
Certifications for "Glamorous"
Region	Certification	Certified units/sales
Australia (ARIA)	3× Platinum	210,000^{^}
Brazil (Pro-Música Brasil)	Platinum	60,000^{‡}
Denmark (IFPI Danmark)	Gold	45,000^{‡}
Germany (BVMI)	Gold	150,000^{‡}
New Zealand (RMNZ)	3× Platinum	90,000^{‡}
United Kingdom (BPI)	Platinum	600,000^{‡}
United States (RIAA)	3× Platinum	3,012,000
United States (RIAA) Mastertone	Platinum	1,000,000^{*}
^{*} Sales figures based on certification alone.^{^} Shipments figures based on certification alone.^{‡} Sales+streaming figures based on certification alone.

== Release history ==
Release history and formats for "Glamorous"
Region	Date	Format(s)	Label(s)	Ref.
United States	January 23, 2007	Contemporary hit radio; digital download (EP)	A&M; Interscope; will.i.am	
United States	February 20, 2007	Rhythmic contemporary radio	A&M; Interscope; will.i.am	
Belgium	March 13, 2007	CD	Polydor	
Germany	March 16, 2007	Maxi CD	Universal Music	
United Kingdom	March 19, 2007	Maxi CD	Polydor	
Australia	April 7, 2007	Maxi CD	Universal Music	
France	June 4, 2007	CD	Polydor	

== See also ==
- List of Billboard Hot 100 number-one singles of 2007
- List of number-one dance singles of 2007 (U.S.)
