= Fergalicious =

2006 single by Fergie

Single by Fergie featuring will.i.am

from the album The Dutchess
- B-side: "Paradise"; "Clumsy"
- Released: October 23, 2006
- Studio: John Lennon Educational Tour Bus
- Genre: Electro; hip hop
- Length: 4:52 (album version); 3:46 (radio edit)
- Label: A&M; Interscope
- Songwriters: Will Adams; Stacy Ferguson; Karl Bartos; Dania Maria Birks; Juana Michelle Burns; Ralf Hütter; Juanita A. Lee; Kim Nazel; Florian Esleben-Scheider; Derrick Rahming; Fatima Shaheed
- Producer: will.i.am

Fergie singles chronology
"London Bridge" (2006)	"Fergalicious" (2006)	"Glamorous" (2007)

will.i.am singles chronology
"I Love My Bitch" (2006)	"Fergalicious" (2006)	"Hip Hop Is Dead" (2006)

Music video
- "Fergalicious" on YouTube

"Fergalicious" is a song recorded by American singer and songwriter Fergie for her debut studio album, The Dutchess (2006). The title is a portmanteau of Fergie and delicious. It was written by her and Black Eyed Peas groupmate will.i.am, who also produced the song as well as performed additional instrumentation and rap vocals. The song was slated as the second single from the album and released for airplay on October 23, 2006. "Fergalicious" is a dance, electro and hip hop song with R&B characteristics. It contains compositional samples of "Supersonic", a song written by Dania Maria Birks, Juana Michelle Burns, Juanita A. Lee, Kim Nazel, and Fatima Shaheed and performed by J. J. Fad, and "Give It All You Got", a song written by Derrick Rahming and popularized by Afro-Rican. The song's bridge contains an interpolation of "Night Train" by Jimmy Forrest and James Brown.

The critical reception of "Fergalicious" was positive, with many praising it as a catchy and danceable track. Some music critics compared the song to "My Humps" (2005), a single released by the Black Eyed Peas from their fourth studio album Monkey Business (2005).

"Fergalicious" was a commercial success in the United States and moderately so in several other countries. In the United States, it peaked at number two on the Billboard Hot 100 and at number two on the Pop Songs chart. "Fergalicious" was certified 4× platinum by the Recording Industry Association of America and sold over 3.5 million digital downloads, becoming Fergie's second best selling song in the United States. In Australia and New Zealand, the song peaked at numbers four and five respectively and received gold certifications. In Europe, the song peaked within the top thirty on several different charts across the continent, including high positions in Finland, Norway, Belgium and France. An accompanying music video was directed by Fatima Robinson and features Fergie and will.i.am in a candy factory, supposedly inspired by Willy Wonka.

== Background ==
"Fergalicious" was written by will.i.am and Fergie, credited as Will Adams and Stacy Ferguson respectively. The song contains samples of "Supersonic" by J. J. Fad and "Give It All You Got" by Afro-Rican. The writers of these two songs, Dania Maria Birks, Juana Michelle Burns, Juanita A. Lee, Kim Nazel, Fatima Shaheed, and Derrick Rahming, receive songwriting credits for "Fergalicious" as a result. The song was recorded while on the John Lennon Educational Tour Bus. will.i.am stated that the song was about Fergie "just being sassy and flaunting her stuff from a strong female perspective, paying homage to Salt-N-Pepa." will.i.am produced the song as well as playing the bass, keys and drum programming. He collaborated with Padraic Kerin on engineering the track while John Hanes edited it through the use of Pro Tools. Serban Ghenea worked with Tim Roberts on mixing the song, which took place at MixStar Studios in Virginia Beach, Virginia. A&M Records, in association with will.i.am Music Group and Interscope Records, sent the song to contemporary hit radio on October 23, 2006. Fergie stated in an interview with MTV that the song reminds her of the old days, when "I went to Knott's Berry Farm [in California] and did what I thought was a dance battle."

== Composition ==
"Fergalicious"
A 30-second sample of the interlude of "Fergalicious", which follows the second chorus and is sung across a jingle style musical backing.

"Fergalicious" is a dance, electro, and hip hop song with a length of 4 minutes and 52 seconds. The song features sampling from two songs, "Supersonic" by J. J. Fad and "Give It All You Got" by Afro-Rican, utilizing their rapping style and synthesized strings respectively. The song is set in common time and has a moderate hip-hop tempo of 129 beats per minute. It is written in the key of B-flat minor and Fergie's vocals span two octaves, from G_{3} to D_{5}. "Fergalicious" begins with a countdown in two different languages, English and Spanish. The song then moves to a fast-paced rhythm and a synth line referencing Kraftwerk's "It's More Fun to Compute", as will.i.am raps. The rhythm transitions into "pong" basslines over which Fergie raps with "detached nonchalance". The song features an interlude that runs in a jingle style.

The lyrics are centered on the theme of self-pride. Fergie raps about how she bests all other women and that no man is worthy enough to date her. Leah Greenblatt of Entertainment Weekly describes the song as a "self-love anthem". Sal Cinquemani of Slant Magazine wrote that the song "opens The Dutchess with a cartoonish Black Eyed Peas tone". According to Kelly Smith of The Maneater, the song is a "rap remix that consists of a catchy chorus and cheesy lyrics."

== Critical reception ==
"Fergalicious" received positive reviews from music critics. Bill Lamb of About.com rated it four out of five stars, liking better than the previous single "London Bridge" which he found "reaked of sleaze". He praised the song as "a sassy, fluffy party tune that should be lighting up pop radio within weeks." Leah Greenblatt of Entertainment Weekly writes that the song does not stray away from her previous works with the Black Eyed Peas, comparing the lyrics to those of "My Humps". Norman Mayers of Prefix thought it and "Here I Come" are fun and flirty songs, writing that "they work because of the dance-floor productions that not only reference '80s hip-hop but also '60s Motown." Dan Gennoe of Yahoo! Music described the song as "booty-shaking electro". Louis Tullo of The Heights writes that "the result [of the song] yields danceable beats and playfully salacious lyrics, but it seems her voice is lost in overproduction." Kelly Smith of The Maneater thought that the song would be successful on the radio, writing "this song will most likely become a radio whore, being played over and over until people are forced to admit that the beat is so-so." Eva Wiseman of The Guardian praised the song as "joyous and fabulous pop music, the kind of people who mop up silently when she wets herself on stage... It even inspires blasphemy in critics." IGN writer Spence D. finds "Fergalicious" to be a nice start up for the album, referring to the song as "an infectious little ditty that grinds its way into your grey matter with unavoidable tenacity."

== Chart performance ==
In the United States, "Fergalicious" entered on the Billboard Hot 100 at number 79. On the issue dated November 11, 2006, the song jumped 13 places from number 19 to number six, entering the top 10 of the chart. After weeks of ascending and descending within the top 10, the song reached a peak of number two on the Hot 100 on the issue dated January 13, 2007 after selling 294,000 downloads. It was blocked from the top spot by "Irreplaceable" by Beyoncé. The song was that week's greatest digital gainer on the chart and generated at the time the greatest digital sales in one week. This record, however, was broken a year later by "Low" by Flo Rida featuring T-Pain on the week of January 12, 2008 after selling 470,000 downloads. The song was certified double platinum on February 22, 2008, by the Recording Industry Association of America (RIAA), and 4× platinum on July 25, 2016. "Fergalicious" is Fergie's second most downloaded song, behind "Big Girls Don't Cry" and ahead of "Glamorous", "Clumsy", and "London Bridge". In 2012, the song became her second single to surpass sales of three million downloads, and it has sold 3,572,000 copies in the US as of September 2017.

In Australia, the song entered at number 11 on the issue dated December 10, 2006 and reached a peak of number four six weeks later. The song has been certified gold by the Australian Recording Industry Association (ARIA) for sales of 35,000 units. On the issue dated December 18, 2006, the song debuted on the chart in New Zealand at number 40. In its fifth week, the song peaked at number five. It has been certified gold by the Recording Industry Association of New Zealand (RIANZ) for sales of 7,500 units. In Belgium, the song peaked on the Flanders chart at number 11 for one week and on the Wallonia Chart at number 17 for three consecutive weeks. In France, the song entered and peaked at number 15 on the issue dated January 27, 2007. It lasted on the chart for total of 18 weeks. "Fergalicious" entered the Singles Top 60 chart in Switzerland on the issue dated December 10, 2006 at number 69. The song fell to number 77 but on the third week ascended 48 places to number 29, where it peaked for one week. It spent a total of 19 weeks on the chart, logging its last week on the issue dated April 22, 2007 at number ninety-two.

== Music video ==
Fergie on the set of the music video

The video premiered on MTV on the day after the single, and premiered on Yahoo! Music on October 31, 2006. The music video was filmed in Hollywood, and directed by Fatima Robinson, who also directed the "My Humps" music video. will.i.am from The Black Eyed Peas also appears in the video, which features Fergie as Willy Wonka in a candy factory called "Fergieland" (the factory was nameless in the original book and both film versions). The video starts with the Oompa Loompas packaging pink and purple boxes of "Fergalicious" candy. In the beginning of the video, Fergie sings in a field of candy canes with the Oompa Loompas. Throughout the video, she wears a tan and khaki girl scout outfit, sports a black one-piece swimsuit while lying in a pile of candy, (often in a kaleidoscope view) works out in a colorful gym flexing her biceps, sings in a room filled with lollipops and other candies while dressed like Shirley Temple, and pops out of a cake while wearing a tiny blue swimsuit with gems encrusted on the exterior. She then starts watching two women wrestle in cake before joining them at the end of the video. Towards the end of the video, Fergie opens and then plays a few notes on a Samsung K5 MP3 Player, giving it center focus in the screen; there then follow, interspersed in the remaining frames of the videos, shots of other characters in the video either listening to the player, presenting it to the camera with a big smile, or carefully handing the player to another extra. As of April 2022, the music video for "Fergalicious" has been viewed over 232 million times on popular video-sharing website, YouTube.

== Track listing ==
- UK promotional CD single (2006)
1. "Fergalicious" (radio edit) – 3:46
- UK CD single (2007)
1. "Fergalicious" (radio edit) – 3:46
2. "Clumsy" (radio edit) – 3:17
- Australian CD single & Europe CD1
1. "Fergalicious" – 3:46
2. "Paradise" – 4:07
- Europe CD2
1. "Fergalicious" – 3:46
2. "Paradise" – 4:08
3. "London Bridge" (live) – 2:43
4. "Fergalicious" (music video) – 3:52

== Official versions ==
- "Fergalicious" (explicit album version) – 4:52
- "Fergalicious" (edited album version) – 4:52
- "Fergalicious" (radio edit) – 3:46

== Credits and personnel ==
Credits adapted from the liner notes of The Dutchess, A&M Records, Will.i.am Music Group, Interscope Records.

Recording and sample

- Recorded on the John Lennon Educational Tour Bus
- Mixed at MixStar Studios in Virginia Beach, Virginia
- Contains an interpolation of "Supersonic", written by Dania Maria Birks, Juana Michelle Burns, Juanita A. Lee, Kim Nazel, and Fatima Shaheed
- Contains elements from the composition "Give It All You Got", written by Derrick Rahming
- Contains elements from "It´s More Fun To Compute" by Kraftwerk

Personnel

- Songwriting – Will Adams, Stacy Ferguson, Dania Maria Birks, Juana Michelle Burns, Juanita A. Lee, Kim Nazel, Fatima Shaheed, Derrick Rahming
- Production – will.i.am
- Bass, keys, and drum programming – will.i.am
- Engineering – will.i.am, Padraic Kerin
- Mixing – Serban Ghenea, Tim Roberts (assistant)
- Pro Tools – John Hanes

== Charts ==
=== Weekly charts ===
Weekly chart performance for "Fergalicious"
Chart (2006–2007)	Peak position
Australia (ARIA)	4
Australian Urban (ARIA)	3
Austria (Ö3 Austria Top 40)	34
Belgium (Ultratop 50 Flanders)	11
Belgium (Ultratop 50 Wallonia)	17
Canada Hot 100 (Billboard)	24
CIS Airplay (TopHit)	34
Czech Republic Airplay (ČNS IFPI)	29
Denmark (Tracklisten)	28
Finland (Suomen virallinen lista)	3
France (SNEP)	15
Germany (GfK)	23
Hungary (Dance Top 40)	40
Italy (FIMI)	44
Netherlands (Dutch Top 40 Tipparade)	2
Netherlands (Single Top 100)	35
New Zealand (Recorded Music NZ)	5
Norway (VG-lista)	10
Romania (Romanian Top 100)	23
Slovakia Airplay (ČNS IFPI)	14
Sweden (Sverigetopplistan)	22
Switzerland (Schweizer Hitparade)	29
UK Singles (Official Charts)	105
US Billboard Hot 100	2
US Dance Club Songs (Billboard)	33
US Dance Airplay (Billboard)	16
US Hot R&B/Hip-Hop Songs (Billboard)	71
US Pop Airplay (Billboard)	2
US Rhythmic Airplay (Billboard)	6
Venezuela Pop Rock (Record Report)	3

=== Year-end charts ===
Year-end chart performance for "Fergalicious"
Chart (2007)	Position
Australia (ARIA)	38
Belgium (Ultratop 50 Flanders)	79
Belgium (Ultratop 50 Wallonia)	70
Brazil (Crowley)	28
CIS (TopHit)	182
US Billboard Hot 100	19

== Certifications ==
Certifications for "Fergalicious"
Region	Certification	Certified units/sales
Australia (ARIA)	2× Platinum	140,000^{^}
Brazil (Pro-Música Brasil)	Diamond	250,000^{‡}
Germany (BVMI)	Gold	150,000^{‡}
New Zealand (RMNZ)	2× Platinum	60,000^{‡}
United Kingdom (BPI)	Gold	400,000^{‡}
United States (RIAA)	4× Platinum	4,000,000
United States (RIAA) Mastertone	Platinum	1,000,000^{*}
^{*} Sales figures based on certification alone.^{^} Shipments figures based on certification alone.^{‡} Sales+streaming figures based on certification alone.

== Release history ==
Release history and formats for "Fergalicious"
Region	Date	Format(s)	Label(s)	Ref.
United States	October 23, 2006	Contemporary hit radio	A&M; Interscope	
Belgium	November 28, 2006	CD	Polydor	
Germany	December 1, 2006	Maxi CD	Universal Music	
Australia	December 8, 2006	CD	Universal Music	
France	January 22, 2007	CD	Polydor	
