= Talk to Me =

Talk to Me may refer to:

== Film and television ==
- Talk to Me (1984 film), an American drama starring Austin Pendleton
- Talk to Me (1996 film), an American television film starring Yasmine Bleeth and Ricky Paull Goldin
- Talk to Me (2006 film), a British documentary by Mark Craig
- Talk to Me (2007 film), an American drama starring Don Cheadle and Chiwetel Ejiofor
- Talk to Me (2022 film), an Australian horror film directed by Danny and Michael Philippou
- Talk to Me (American TV series), a 2000 sitcom
- Talk to Me (British TV series), a 2007 four-part drama series
- "Talk to Me" (Doctors), a 2004 television episode
- "Talk to Me" (Juliet Bravo), a 1985 television episode

== Music ==
=== Albums ===
- Talk to Me (Joey McIntyre album), 2006
- Talk to Me (Xuxa album), 1994
- Talk to Me: Hits, Rarities & Gems, by Wild Orchid, 2006
- Talk to Me, by Little Willie John, 1958

=== Songs ===
- "Talk to Me" (Babyface song), 1996
- "Talk to Me" (Bahjat song), 2016
- "Talk to Me" (Brandy, Ray J and Willie Norwood song), 2010
- "Talk to Me" (Cosmo's Midnight song), 2018
- "Talk to Me" (Damiano David, Tyla and Nile Rodgers song), 2025
- "Talk to Me" (Drakeo the Ruler song), 2021
- "Talk to Me" (Joe Seneca song), originally recorded by Little Willie John (1958), covered by many artists
- "Talk to Me" (Kiss song), 1980
- "Talk to Me" (Nirvana song), 2004
- "Talk to Me" (Peaches song), 2009
- "Talk to Me" (Stevie Nicks song), 1985
- "Talk to Me" (Tory Lanez and Rich the Kid song), 2018
- "Talk to Me", by Anita Baker from Compositions, 1990
- "Talk to Me", by Buckcherry from Black Butterfly, 2008
- "Talk to Me", by Carly Rae Jepsen from Curiosity, 2012
- "Talk to Me", by Chico DeBarge from Chico DeBarge, 1986
- "Talk to Me", by Chris de Burgh from Power of Ten, 1992
- "Talk to Me", by Chris Isaak from Silvertone, 1985
- "Talk to Me", by Craig David from The Time Is Now, 2018
- "Talk to Me", by Fiona from her self-titled album, 1985
- "Talk to Me", by Frank Sinatra, 1959
- "Talk to Me", by Joe Satriani from his self-titled EP, 1984
- "Talk to Me", by Joni Mitchell from Don Juan's Reckless Daughter, 1977
- "Talk to Me", by Mary J. Blige from Growing Pains, 2007
- "Talk to Me", by Nick Brewer, 2015
- "Talk to Me", by Olivia Newton-John from Totally Hot, 1978
- "Talk to Me", by Quarterflash from Back into Blue, 1985
- "Talk to Me", by Red Velvet from Rookie, 2017
- "Talk to Me", by Robyn from Sexistential, 2026
- "Talk to Me", by Run the Jewels from Run the Jewels 3, 2016
- "Talk to Me", by Southside Johnny and the Asbury Jukes from Hearts of Stone, 1978; also recorded by its composer, Bruce Springsteen
- "Talk to Me", by Wild Orchid from Wild Orchid, 1997
- "Talk to Me", by Zayn from Icarus Falls, 2018

== Other uses ==
- Talk to Me (exhibition), a 2011 exhibit at the Museum of Modern Art, New York City
- Talk to Me (NYC), a cultural phenomenon initiated by Bill Wetzel and Liz Barry in 2002
- Talk to Me, a 2025 book by Rich Benjamin
