= Talk to Me: Hits, Rarities & Gems =

Talk To Me: Hits, Rarities & Gems

Compilation album by Wild Orchid
- Released: September 26, 2006; September 26, 2008 (re-release)
- Recorded: Music Grinder Studios, Hollywood, CA
- Genres: Pop, R&B, dance-pop, electronica
- Labels: Sony BMG; RCA records
- Producers: Sylvia Bennett-Smith, Ron Fair, Stacy Ferguson, David Frank, Stefanie Ridel, Evan Rogers, Bobby Sandstrom, Renee Sandstrom, Carl Sturken, Junior Vasquez, Matthew Wilder

Wild Orchid chronology
Hypnotic (2003)	Talk To Me: Hits, Rarities & Gems (2006)

Alternative cover
- 2008 Re-Release

Talk To Me: Hits, Rarities & Gems is a compilation album by American girl group Wild Orchid. It was released by Sony BMG on September 26, 2006. It was re-released exactly two years later, on September 26, 2008 as 20th Century Masters - The Millennium Collection: The Best of Wild Orchid with new cover art.

The album compiles all of the singles from their first two studio albums Wild Orchid (1997) and Oxygen (1998) in addition to their 2001 single "Stuttering (Don't Say)" and a handful of album tracks. The compilation does not feature any songs from Hypnotic (2003).

== Track list ==
1. "Talk to Me" (radio version) 3:55
2. "Supernatural" (mainstream radio version) 4:07
3. "At Night I Pray" (single version) 4:20
4. "The River"
5. "Stuttering (Don't Say)" (radio version) 3:58
6. "Lies" (single version)
7. "Be Mine" (rhythm mix) 3:49
8. "Holding On" 3:26
9. "Follow Me"
10. "Talk to Me" (Junior Vasquez deluxe club mix) 6:17
