= John Michael Ferrari =

American journalist (born 1947)

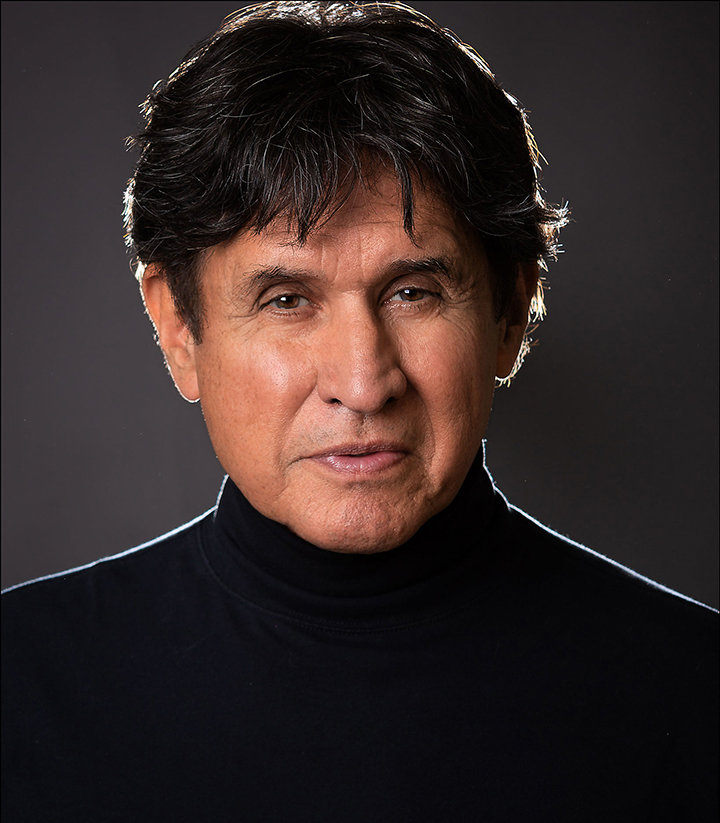
- Born: November 11, 1947 (age 78); Hollywood, California, U.S.
- Occupations: Singer songwriter, arranger, entertainer, producer, photographer, journalist
- Notable credit: Outstanding Male Singer Songwriter 2019 - Fame Award by Producer's Choice Honors

John Michael Ferrari (born November 11, 1947), is an American singer-songwriter, entertainer, music arranger, composer, and author.

== Early years ==
Ferrari was sent to the Nevada State Children's Home at age 15 and joined the United States Army at age 18 serving in the Vietnam War.

== Entertainment industry ==
Singer songwriter John Michael Ferrari started his entertainment careers as a singer/composer, writing musical jingles as well as performing in live concerts and, with Pepper Jay continues as a performing coach whose clients included Liquid Blue (Pop Album of the Year: LA Music Awards), Nikki Nova (Top 10 International Taiwan Idol), Allison Iraheta (American Idol, Season 8, Top 4), and Gisell (Winner: Talentos Premios).

Ferrari has been writing songs since he was a kid. Ferrari's first song of note, "Dustoff" was penned while serving in the Vietnam War and is a favorite among veterans on Ferrari's My Early Life album, along with songs "Let's Run Away to Alaska," "Run," and "When Love Said Good-bye," all which he performs regularly as an entertainer or keynote concert speaker at resorts, clubs, charity events and causes, including those hosted by International Myeloma Foundation, The Thalians and City of Hope. Ferrari enjoys sharing and often provides opportunities to his performance students as they share Ferrari's "Teen Tunes" on stage with him.

Ferrari and Pepper Jay presently have two versions of The John Michael Ferrari Band, one which performs in the greater Las Vegas area with Nevada players and the other in the greater Nashville area with Nashville players. Ferrari currently performs his original songs with Dr. John Nowins aka "Sexy Sticks" on drums, Dr. David Miller aka "The Professor" on bass, Dr. Bruce Topper aka Nomad on keys, Brad Torchin or Dylan Bodley on lead guitar, and vocalists Katie Jensen, Carol Champney, Brandi MacLaren, and/or Tarryn Aimee.

Ferrari's previous Band, "Ferrari & Friends," entertained from 1990 through 2010, with Thurston Watts, Mack Doughtery, Pat Zicara, Katie Jensen, Norman A. Norman, Russell Watts, Al Boyd, Kenyatta Mackey, Al Vescovo, and Allison Iraheta.

As photographer and director of photography, Ferrari worked with top models and up-and-coming filmmakers. His credits include the Minor Matters CD for the musical group Peoples Republic and movie posters for "Redemption" by Agenda Pictures.

As a director, his credits include the film Hercules in Hollywood, the TV pilot 'The Road Studio', and TV episodes for the W Network in Canada.

John Michael Ferrari is Creative Producer, director, and editor, who, along with music partner Pepper Jay of Pepper Jay Productions LLC founded Actors Reporter and Actors Entertainment online magazines. Ferrari and Jay also founded the label, Cappy Records.

Ferrari graced the cover of Hollywood Weekly with a six-page article. (February 2020.)

Ferrari is the author of Acting with your Eyes. Along with Pepper Jay, Ferrari is the co-author of Dynamic Song Performance, the Singer's Bible.

In addition to performing for full houses, John Michael Ferrari was asked by KPFF 97.7 fm to create a semi-weekly 1/2 hour radio show, Songwriters Perspective where he shares songwriting and performance tips and he and Pepper Jay interview and play the music of other songwriters. Also Fridays, this local Pahrump, Nevada radio station has "Ferrari Fridays" playing John Michael Ferrari songs exclusively from 4:30pm - 6pm PST.

== Musical career ==
Ferrari (affiliated with American Society of Composers, Authors and Publishers (known as ASCAP) & Nashville Songwriters Association International) is known for writing and performing dozens of his original songs, penning the lyrics and creating the musical arrangements.

Ferrari began his professional songwriting career in 1990 with Pepper Jay as his producer in Los Angeles, California. The two first met while Ferrari was performing at the Highland Springs Resort, in Cherry Valley, California.

An early collaboration with Pepper Jay resulted in Ferrari's first album, My Early Life, produced by Pepper Jay and mastered by George Velmer and John Vestman, for Pepper Jay Productions on the Cappy Records Label (1990). This album contains Ferrari's earliest songs, When Love Said Good-Bye, Ain’t No Mistaken, Brand New River, Breaking Up Inside, Dustoff, Let's Run Away to Alaska, Run, Sentimental Fool, That's What You Do, Why'd Momma Lie, and When Love Said Good-Bye (instrumental).

Ferrari's songs are available on most musical platforms, including Apple Music, Spotify, and Amazon Music.

Ferrari was named "Male Singer Songwriter of the Year" by the F.A.M.E. Awards (2019), and his song, "Like a Rock and Roll Band" was awarded "Peace Song of the Year" by the Hollywood Tribute to the Oscars and Art 4 Peace (2020). Ferrari was awarded for "Outstanding Triple A Album" by the Producer's Choice Honors (2020). Ferrari was voted Rising Star 2020 by the eZWay Golden Gala, as well as Crossover Artist of the Year 2021 by the New Music Awards. John Michael Ferrari was also featured on the cover of eZWay Magazine 2021 and Hollywood Weekly Nashville 2021.

Ferrari collaborated with Pepper Jay again with his album, Be the Smile on Your Face under their independent label, Cappy Records. This album contains Ferrari's most recent song creations, Be the Smile on Your Face, Don't Need a Reason, I Don't Want to Love, If We Could Be Lovers, Keep Falling All Over Myself, Nowhere to LA, Peggy Sues, So Beautiful, Somewhere We Could Fall, What Are You Doing, Who Can Blame a Broken Heart, and You Should Be Winning. "A fun-loving, storytelling Nam Vet from Hollywood, CA, John Michael Ferrari pours out a whiskey-hued glass of Pop, Country, Gospel, Blues and Jazz in his music." Be the Smile on Your Face begins with the title track and immediately the listener is treated to the tenderness and soul provided by John Michael Ferrari’s excellent vocal performances."

The singles off the "Be the Smile on Your Face" album, "So Beautiful", "Somewhere We Could Fall," "Be the Smile on Your Face," "Masquerading in the Night" and "Who's That Girl" hit #1 on several independent radio charts and top 10 on numerous country, pop and adult contemporary national and international radio charts.

In 2022, Ferrari collaborated with Pepper Jay on his country pop crossover album, My Heart Can't Breathe. This album contains the 11 songs "Like Rock n Roll Band", "How My Doing", Masquerading in the Night", "My Heart Can't Breathe", "My You", "Bad Dream", "In the Night" (duet with Tania Hancheroff), "You're My Dream Girl", "Paint You a Love Song", "Forever Is Not Enough", and "Last Song of the Show". That year, Nashville Music Awards named Ferrari "Outstanding Male Singer Songwriter".

"Workin' My Way to Nashville" a country tune co-written by John Michael Ferrari, Pepper Jay, and Ray Ligon, sung by Ray Ligon was named "Outstanding Country Single" by Nashville Music Awards 2023 and "Songwriter of the Year" by the Kentucky Country Music Association 2023. Also, the Nashville Music Awards 2023 named Ferrari "Radio Artist of the Year".

In 2023, Ferrari released a gospel spiritual EP, Soldiers Prayer, with songs "Soldiers Prayer", "Bring Me Home", "The Son Don't Lie", and a re-release of "Like a Rock n Roll Band". The track "Bring Me Home" about going to Heaven, was named Best Gospel and won Ferrari "Songwriter of the Year 50a+ at the West Coast Country Music Association Awards 2024.

In 2024, Ferrari released his album, I Keep Dreaming, a generally upbeat pop country crossover with 11 songs: "I Keep Dreaming" (an upbeat arrangement of the ballad "Sentimental Fool" off of his "My Early Life" Album), "Who's That Girl", 'Music With You", "I Keep Rollin' On", "One Heck of a Girl", "Are You Ready for Love", "Yes I Do", "Are You Ready for Love", "Crazy in Love", "Please Tell Them", "I Wouldn't Lie", and "That's What You Do" (a medium tempo arrangement of the ballad "That's What You Do" off of his "My Early Life" album). The country track "I Keep Rollin' On" was named "Best New Country 50+ at the West Coast Country Music Association awards 2024.

John Michael Ferrari has a volume of unpublished cross-genre, country, pop, and Christian songs. These songs continue to be produced by Pepper Jay.

== Discography ==
=== Studio albums ===
- My Early Life (1990)
- Be the Smile on Your Face (2020)
- My Heart Can't Breathe (2022)
- Soldiers Prayer (2023)
- I Keep Dreaming (2024)

=== Singles ===
- "Dustoff" (2011)
- "Let's Run Away to Alaska" (2011)
- "Don't Fall Between the Daylight" (2011)
- "Why’d Momma Lie?" (2018)
- "Sentimental Fool I Keep Dreaming" (2019)
- "Bad Dream" (2020)
- "Keep Falling All Over Myself" (2020)
- "The Son Don’t Lie"' (2020)
- "So Beautiful" (2020)
- "Somewhere We Could Fall" (2020)
- "My Heart Can't Breathe" (2021)
- "Paint You a Love Song" (2022) written with Pepper Jay
- "Masquerading in the Night" (2022) written with Pepper Jay
- "Music With You" (2023) written with Pepper Jay
- "Who's That Girl" (2023) written with Pepper Jay
- "Workin' My Way to Nashville" (2023) written with Pepper Jay and Ray Ligon
- "Soldiers Prayer" (2023) written with Pepper Jay

== Showlist ==
Program with host John Michael Ferrari	Featured Guest	Occupation	Episode (Date)
Songwriters Perspective	Bob Bender and music by Marc-Alan Barnette	Musicians	2024-02-25
Songwriters Perspective	Cody Howell with music by Jerry Wayne Allen Steve J Curtis	Musicians	2023-12-23
Songwriters Perspective	Todd Carey and music of Jean Cabbie	Musicians	2023-09-02
Songwriters Perspective	Don Ellis Gatlin of Darryl & Don Ellis	Singer Songwriter	2023-05-14
Songwriters Perspective	Tommy Rice	Songwriter	2023-04-15
Songwriters Perspective	Andy Shearer and music by Lain Thomilson	Musicians	2023-02-23
Songwriters Perspective	Sharon Marie White	Singer Songwriter	2023-02-12
Songwriters Perspective	Anthony Preston	Singer Songwriter	2023-01-29
Songwriters Perspective	Drew Smith	Songwriter & Artist	2023-01-14
Songwriters Perspective	Randy Dorman	Songwriter & Arranger	2022-12-17
Songwriters Perspective	Dane Louis	Singer Songwriter	2022-11-19
Songwriters Perspective	Kel Adore and music by Brandi MacLaren	Pop Artist, Singer Songwriter	2022-11-06
Songwriters Perspective	Payton Howie	Singer Songwriter	2022-10-24
Songwriters Perspective	Presley Tennant	Singer Songwriter	2022-10-15
Motivational Chat	Kristen Rose	Miss Teen USA 2010	2011-07-06
Motivational Chat	Brett Walkow	Actor / Comedian	2011-08-11
'ActorsE' Chat Show	Larry "Flash" Jenkins	Filmmaker	2011-05-30
Sidebeat Music	Fancy	Singer	2011-04-23
"Believabililty is the key to successful performance"	Pepper Jay	Entertainment Journalist	2009-06-15
