= Pepper Jay =

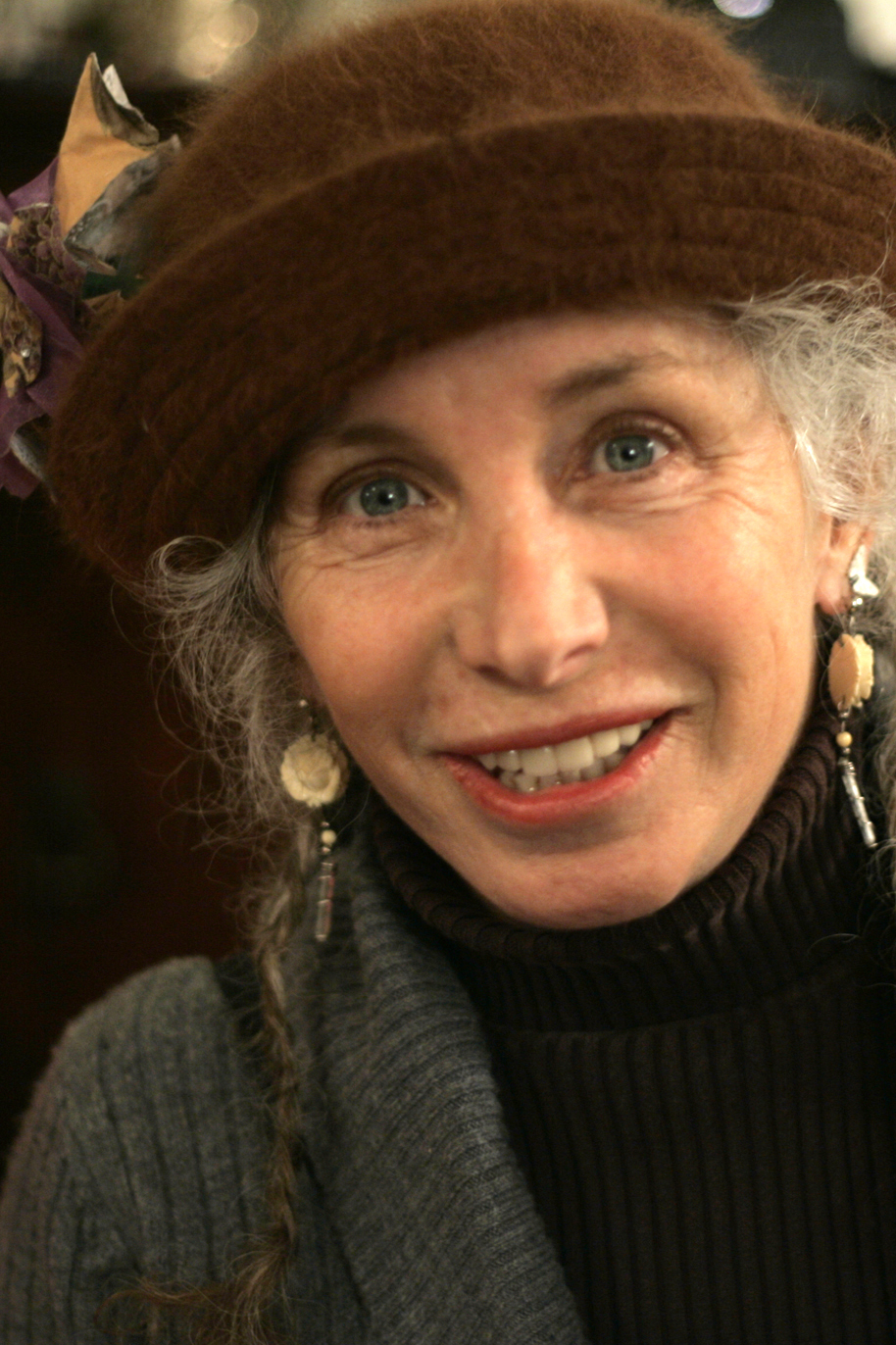
- Pepper Jay in 2011
- Born: Susan Carole Jay; May 12, 1949 (age 77); Hollywood, California
- Occupation: Music Producer / Speaker / Author / Actress / Teacher / Former Attorney

Pepper Jay (née Susan Carole Jay), born May 12, 1949, in Hollywood, California, is an American music producer, teacher and lecturer (Life Time Teaching Credential - State of California), an actress (member of the Screen Actors Guild / AFTRA and Actors Equity), an author [Dynamic Song Performance, a Singer's Bible], and a former attorney licensed in the state of California.

== Early career and education ==
Pepper Jay began her performance career as a child writing and performing in playground, local theatre, and backyard plays. She appeared in two episodes of the television sitcom, The Real McCoys starring Walter Brennan, which premiered on ABC in 1957. After dropping out of Susan Miller Dorsey High School in Los Angeles, California, she earned her an Associate Arts degree from El Camino College in Torrance, California and an undergraduate Bachelor of Arts degree from San Diego State University. Thereafter, Pepper Jay obtained a lifetime teaching credential from the State of California. Fluent in Spanish, Jay in the 1970s taught drama, dance, Spanish, law, and health and physical education for the Los Angeles Unified School District. She was assigned to the campuses of Hollywood High School, John Muir Junior High School, and at Crenshaw High School, where she taught tap dancing and produced shows by the 100+ member drill team. She also taught school and lectured for several other school districts, including Bakersfield, CA, and San Diego, CA. Pepper Jay transitioned from her public teaching career in 1983 and earned her Juris Doctor degree from the University of San Diego School of Law. In 1985, she was admitted to the State Bar of California and went on to practice law in State and Federal Court for 32 years specializing in representing trustees and creditors in breach of contract and fraud litigation. During this time, Pepper Jay was a member of the Wilshire Bar Association and President of that Association for 3 years.

== Career in entertainment ==
In 1990, Pepper Jay established the entertainment company, Pepper Jay Productions, LLC. She created the Working Actors Group, where, from 1993 through 2010, she and teaching partner John Michael Ferrari offered on-camera and cold-reading workshops to selected union actors. Pepper Jay continues today to coach performance skills for singers, actors, teachers, lawyers, students, and speakers.

Pepper Jay's performance students include Allison Iraheta (American Idol, Season 8, Top 4), Stevie Wright (Season 8, Top 36), Nikki Nova (Taiwan Idol, 2010, Top 10), Liquid Blue (Pop Album of the Year, Los Angeles Music Awards), Gisell (Winner: Talentos Premios), teen opera singer Golda Berkman, and hip hop dancer and singer, Montana Tucker.

In 2008, Pepper Jay Productions created the Actors Podcast Network and its first channel Actors Reporter and in 2009 her company established a second channel Actors Entertainment, which consists of 12 internet and cable shows, including ActorsE Chat, Models Best Friend, Sidebeat Music, and Tinsel on the Town.

Pepper Jay is the author of "Dynamic Song Performance, The Singer's Bible," available on Amazon, with contributions by John Michael Ferrari, preface by Allison Iraheta, and photographs by John Michael Ferrari, Jeff Knight, and John Wright.

Pepper Jay was honored by the Multicultural Motion Picture Association with the Diamond Rose Award in Entertainment (2016). Pepper is also an American Ambassador for Arts 4 Peace Awards (2015), and traveled to Lagos, Nigeria and Paris, France on behalf of that organization.

Pepper Jay was awarded the Dr. Dante Sears’ Heartpreneur of the Year Legend Award (2020) by the eZWay Network Virtual Wall of Fame Awards.

Pepper Jay's keynote speaking, teaching, acting and music producing career continues.

== Musical career ==
Pepper Jay has produced music for more than 30 years with her performing singer songwriter recording artist partner, John Michael Ferrari, for whom she has created four crossover country pop albums, a dozen singles, and, recently, an inspirational EP.

Pepper Jay’s latest project was a country song, “Workin’ My Way to Nashville” (“Workin”), written by John Michael Ferrari, Pepper Jay, and Ray Ligon, with Ray Ligon as the artist. Workin’ hit independent country music radio charts, was named “Outstanding Country Single” by the Nashville Music Awards 2023, and won the Kentucky Music Association Songwriters of the Year award (2023) and is headed to the North American Country Music Awards in Pigeon Forge in 2024.

Pepper Jay’s upcoming project is the album, “I Keep Dreaming,” eleven songs by John Michael Ferrari, to be released January 15, 2024 on the independent label, Cappy Records. Two singles have teased this album, “Music With You” and “Who’s That Girl”, both of which have topped independent country and pop radio charts.

Pepper Jay’s most recent project, “Soldiers Prayer” is an inspirational EP written by John Michael Ferrari and Pepper Jay, featuring their “Bring Me Home” ballad about dying and going to heaven, and “The Son Don’t Lie,” suggesting the true way is with the Lord.

Pepper Jay’s previous project with John Michael Ferrari was the 2022 album, “My Heart Can’t Breathe”. Pepper Jay was named “Outstanding AC Music Producer of the Year” 2021 by the Producers Choice Honors for “My Heart Can’t Breathe”. The song, “Like a Rock n Roll Band” was named “Peace Song of the Year” at the Art 4 Peace Oscar Party at the Beverly Hills Hotel. “Masquerading in the Night” was awarded “Best Song Production” 2022 by the Museboat Live Channel. The album also included the highly-regarded wedding song, “Paint You a Love Song”.

Pepper Jay’s 2020 album, “Be the Smile on Your Face“ with storytelling country crossover songs written by John Michael Ferrari and Pepper Jay, was awarded “AAA Album of the Year” by the Las Vegas Producers Choice Honors. and four of the twelve songs hit in the Top 10 of several radio charts including “So Beautiful”.

From 1990 through 2010, Pepper Jay produced live entertainment with John Michael Ferrari’s former band, “Ferrari & Friends,” with John Michael Ferrari, Mary Elizabeth McGlynn, Thurston Watts, Mack Doughtery, Pat Zicari, Rosemary Richards, Katie Jensen, Norman A. Norman, Russell Watts, Al Boyd, Kenyatta Mackey, Al Vescovo, and Allison Iraheta. From 2015 through the present, Pepper Jay produces live entertainment with The John Michael Ferrari Bands, one from Las Vegas, Nevada, and the other from Nashville, Tennessee.

Pepper Jay Productions is a music publisher, under the record label Cappy Records, and is a member of the American Society of Composers, Authors and Publishers (ASCAP).

Pepper Jay continues to coach individuals on song performance skills using the textbook she authored, “Dynamic Song Performance, a Singer's Bible”.

== Discography ==
=== Studio albums ===
- My Early Life, John Michael Ferrari (1990)
- Be the Smile on Your Face, John Michael Ferrari (2020)

=== Singles ===
- Dustoff, John Michael Ferrari (2011)
- Let’s Run Away to Alaska, John Michael Ferrari (2011)
- Don’t Fall Between the Daylight, John Michael Ferrari (2011)
- Why’d Momma Lie?, John Michael Ferrari (2018)
- Sentimental Fool I Keep Dreaming, John Michael Ferrari (2019)
- Bad Dream, John Michael Ferrari (2020)
- Keep Falling All Over Myself, John Michael Ferrari (2020)
- The Son Don’t Lie, John Michael Ferrari (2020)
- My Heart Can't Breathe, John Michael Ferrari (2021)
