= Halo Circus =

American musical group

- Origin: Los Angeles, California
- Genres: Rock, alternative rock, synth-pop
- Years active: 2013–2019
- Label: Halo Circus Media
- Past members: Allison Iraheta; Matthew Hager; Brian Stead; Veronica Bellino; David Immerman; Valerie Franco; Liz Anne Hill; Gerry Mattei; Matteo Eyia

Halo Circus was an American electronic duo. Formed as a four-piece band in 2013, founding musicians Allison Iraheta and Matthew Hager re-established Halo Circus as a duo in 2018.

== History ==
Halo Circus was formed in 2013. Iraheta, a finalist on the eighth season of American Idol, had released her debut album, Just Like You, on Jive in 2009. While touring in support of the album, she met Hager, a songwriter, musician, and producer. After Iraheta recorded vocals on a song Hager had been working on, they began to write together, and later decided to form a band. They recruited drummer Valerie Franco and guitarist David Immerman, both of whom had performed previously with Iraheta, and founded Halo Circus.

In an interview with New-Transcendence.com, Iraheta commented on the origin of the band's name: "We wanted a name that represented the lightness and darkness of the world we live in. The beauty and chaos that we all juggle. Halo Circus was perfect for us. "Halo" representing the sacredness of our lives and "circus" the chaos of the world we all live in."

=== Gone EP and first shows (2013–2014) ===
Their first show took place in January 2013 at the Troubador in Los Angeles. A month later, they appeared on Yahoo Music, performing for the first time with accordionist Gee Rabe.

The band was signed to indie label Manimal Vinyl in 2013 and released the single "Gone", consisting of two mixes and a Spanish version of the song. "Gone" was the first song written by the core trio of the band and was done before they officially became a band. It was based on Iraheta's experience with Jive, who dropped her as a recording artist in 2011. "It's a very sad song," she said in an interview with The Hollywood Reporter. "But out of that came more sessions and more songs and the realization that I had to admit how hurt I was." Iraheta described this moment as a hard time in her life but also said it was okay to go through times such as this after experiencing the energy Halo Circus provided when making their debut album.

As Hager and Iraheta continued to collaborate as songwriters, the band played a series of high-profile shows. With Veronica Bellino on drums — Franco left the band in mid-2013 — they performed at the Whisky a Go Go's 50th anniversary celebration, and at two Grammy events: the Los Angeles Grammy Showcase and the "Women Who Rock" Grammy Cruise, where they appeared with Emmylou Harris and Heart, among others.

In July 2014, they released "Do You Believe in Shame" on the Duran Duran tribute album, Making Patterns Rhyme. A compilation, it also included contributions from Moby and Warpaint.

In September 2014, Halo Circus began a four-week residency at the Hotel Café in Hollywood.

=== 2015-2017: Bunny, East Lansing EP and touring ===
In February 2015, with Brian Stead replacing David Immerman, the band decided to shelve an album they had intended to release as their debut. It was re-recorded over a six-week period at Little White Lotus Studios in Compton, California. It was produced by Hager and mixed by Craig Bauer.

The first single from the album, "Desire (Lo Que Vale La Pena)", was released in February 2016 through BitTorrent. Iraheta said the song was about freedom: "Not the freedom we confuse for convenience, but the real freedom that is granted to every soul that enters a body on this planet. When one is oppressed, we are all oppressed. We are all born with the desire to love and the desire to defend it." The "Desire" video, directed by Nick Egan, was shot in South Central L.A., with Iraheta wearing a pageant-style sash reading "Immigrant."

Halo Circus teamed with the crowdsourcing platform RoadNation in February 2016 to fund their first national tour. Their debut album, Bunny, was released on June 23, 2016. Iraheta said the success of the tour allowed them to create their next album.

The band's "Follow the Rabbit US Summer Tour" of small clubs kicked off in Southern California on August 18, 2016. For the first leg in August 2016, the roster was the musicians from the album, Iraheta, Hager, Stead and Bellino. In September 2016, drummer Matteo Eyia replaced Bellino, who went on tour in Australia with guitarist Orianthi.

On May 5, 2017, the band released a five-song EP titled The East Lansing Sessions. It was recorded at Troubadour Recording Studios in Lansing Michigan while the band was touring in the summer of 2016, and featured five songs, including three re-recorded songs from Bunny. Also included were the song "Stand Up" and a cover of Neil Young's "The Needle and the Damage Done.

In June 2017, a stripped-down Halo Circus embarked on a 30-date tour called the "Intimate Spring Tour 2017," featuring Iraheta, solely backed up by Hager. According to Iraheta, she and Hager performed as a duo due to complications that arose that left them without their guitarist and drummer. Instead of cancelling the tour, they performed as a duo.

=== 2018-2019: Robots and Wranglers and disbandment ===
Halo Circus released Robots and Wranglers in March 2018. It was preceded by a single, "Narcissist". A 24-date tour was performed. Iraheta said the album had a "cinematic aspect" and sounded "as though it was recorded in a spaceship."

On September 25, 2019, after an eight-month silence on social media, Iraheta announced on Facebook that Halo Circus would be disbanding due to her parting ways with Hager both professionally and personally.

== Band members ==
- Allison Iraheta – lead vocals (2013–2019)
- Matthew Hager – bass, keyboards (2013–2019)
- Brian Stead – lead guitar, backing vocals (2015–2018)
- Veronica Bellino – drums, backing vocals (2013–2016)
- David Immerman – lead guitar, backing vocals (2013–2015)
- Valerie Franco – drums, backing vocals (2013)
- Liz Anne Hill – bass, backing vocals (2010)
- Gerry Mattei – keyboards, backing vocals (2010)
- Matteo Eyia – drums, backing vocals (2016)

== Discography ==
=== Studio albums ===
Year	Album details	Peak positions		Certifications (sales threshold)
Year	Album details	US	US Digital	Certifications (sales threshold)
2016	Bunny: Release date: June 23, 2016; Format: CD, digital download	-	-	
2018	Robots and Wranglers: Release date: March 16, 2018; Format: CD, digital download	-	-	
