= Elizabeth Barry (disambiguation) =

Elizabeth Barry (1658–1713) was an English actress.

Elizabeth Barry may also refer to:

- Elizabeth Barry (sailor) from August 2011 in sports
- Beth Barry, North and South Women's Amateur Golf Championship
- Liz Barry of Talk to Me (NYC)
