= Great Pretenders (game show) =

- Genre: Game show
- Written by: Shuki Levy; Kussa Mahchi
- Directed by: Barry Glazer
- Presented by: Stacy Ferguson; Stefanie Ridel; Renee Sands
- Theme music composer: The Platters
- Opening theme: We’re the Great Pretenders
- Ending theme: We’re Still the Great Pretenders
- Composer: Wild Orchid
- Country of origin: United States
- Original language: English
- No. of seasons: 4

Production
- Running time: 30 minutes

Original release
- Network: Fox Family
- Release: October 31, 1998 – June 30, 2002

Great Pretenders is an American half-hour television music game show that originally aired on Fox Family and ran for four seasons from 1998 to 2002. It was hosted by former pop trio Wild Orchid. On the show, teenagers lip synced and danced to their favorite songs for the chance to win prizes. Their performances were subsequently judged by a live studio audience.

== See also ==
- Lip Service
- Lip Sync Battle
- Puttin' on the Hits
