= Wild Orchid (album) =

Studio album by Wild Orchid
- Released: March 25, 1997
- Recorded: 1995
- Studio: Music Grinder (Hollywood)
- Genre: R&B
- Length: 49:39
- Label: RCA
- Producers: Sylvia Bennett-Smith; Ron Fair; Stacy Ferguson; David Frank; Stefanie Ridel; Evan Rogers; Bobby Sandstrom; Renee Sandstrom; Carl Sturken; Junior Vasquez; Matthew Wilder

Wild Orchid chronology
Wild Orchid (1997)	Oxygen (1998)

Professional ratings
Review scores
Source	Rating
AllMusic	3/5 stars
Entertainment Weekly	B+
MSN	3/5 stars

Wild Orchid is the debut album by the American girl group Wild Orchid, released on March 25, 1997. It is their most successful album, selling nearly a million units worldwide. The album was nominated for two Lady of Soul Awards. It spawned the singles "Talk to Me", "At Night I Pray" and "Supernatural".

== Production ==
After signing a recording contract with RCA Records, the trio wrote and recorded songs throughout 1995 with the help of Renee's songwriter brother Bobby Sandstrom. The album took approximately nine months to complete.

== Release and promotion ==
They released their debut single "At Night I Pray" on September 3, 1996, with the album due for an October 29, 1996, release. However, it was postponed twice, first to February 11, 1997. It was eventually released on March 25, 1997.

The album debuted with its highest chart position in Billboard's Top 200 Albums Chart at #153.

The album also received two Billboard Music Award nominations for "Talk to Me" and two Soul Train Lady of Soul Award nominations - one for Album of the Year By a Group, Band or Duo and one for Best Music Video for "Talk to Me". The group also received an American Music Award for Favorite R&B/Soul Artist.

== Promotion ==
Wild Orchid spent 1996 and 1997 promoting their debut album. They made appearances on Soul Train, Ricki Lake, Access Hollywood, MTV, Wild On!, The RuPaul Show, Hard Copy, The HitList with Tarzan Dan, Vibe, Mad TV, The Pat Bullard Show, Caryl & Marilyn: Real Friends, Terry Bradshaw, Crook and Chase, The Jenny Jones Show, Electric Circus and Goode Behavior. The group also toured with 98 Degrees and 'N Sync across the U.S., Canada and Asia.

The singles "At Night I Pray", "Talk to Me" and "Supernatural", were modest hits, each appearing on the Billboard Hot 100 Singles Chart.

Promotional remixes of "Follow Me" and "I Won't Play the Fool" were released in May 1998; "I Won't Play the Fool" charted within the top ten on the Billboard magazine Dance/Club songs chart.

== Track listing ==
1. "At Night I Pray" (Duran, Bobby Sandstrom, Wild Orchid) – 4:16
2. "Supernatural" (Evan Rogers, Carl Sturken, Wild Orchid) – 4:38
3. "I Won't Play the Fool" (Sylvia Bennett-Smith) – 4:26
4. "Talk to Me" (Antonina Armato, Junior Vasquez) – 4:48
5. "The River" (Bennett-Smith) – 4:28
6. "You Don't Own Me" (Ron Fair, Wild Orchid, Matthew Wilder) – 4:23
7. "My Tambourine" (Sandstrom, Wild Orchid) – 4:30
8. "Follow Me" (Bennett-Smith, Wild Orchid) – 4:15
9. "He's Alright" (Fabian Cook, Fair, Sandstrom, Wild Orchid) – 5:15
10. "Love Will Wait" (Clif Magness, Wild Orchid) – 4:05
11. "Life" (Fair, Stefanie Ridel) – 4:35

== Personnel ==
- Sylvia Bennett-Smith – arranger, keyboard programming, producer, vocal arrangement
- Bob Brockman – mixing
- Luis Conte – percussion
- Fabian Cook – human beatbox
- Peter Doell – mixing
- Ron Fair – arranger, bass vocals, celeste, engineer, executive producer, guitar, harmonica, keyboards, producer, sound effects, vocal arrangement
- Fergie – producer, vocals, backing vocals
- Eric Fischer – engineer, guitar
- Steve Forman – percussion
- David Frank – arranger, assistant producer, Clavinet, Fender Rhodes, keyboard programming, organ, piano, producer
- John Goux – guitar
- Gary Grant – trumpet
- Jerry Hey – horn arrangements, trumpet
- Dan Higgins – horn
- Marc Hugenberger – programming
- Bashiri Johnson – percussion
- Teddy Kampel – rhythm guitar
- Abraham Laboriel – bass
- Lynette Lewis – toaster
- Pete Lorimer – arranger, drums, keyboards, loops, programming
- Al McKay – guitar
- Dennis Mitchell – engineer
- Joey Moskowitz – arranger, keyboard programming, rhythm arrangements
- Robbie Nevil – guitar
- Bill Reichenbach Jr. – trombone
- Stefanie Ridel – producer, vocals, backing vocals
- John "J.R." Robinson – drums
- Evan Rogers – arranger, producer, vocal arrangement
- Michael C. Ross – engineer
- Randee Saint Nicholas – photography
- Bobby Sandstrom – arranger, drum programming, keyboard programming, organ, producer, vocal arrangement
- Renee Sandstrom – producer, vocals, background vocals
- Robbes Stieglitz – mixing
- Carl Sturken – arranger, drum programming, guitar, keyboard programming, producer, vocal arrangement
- Junior Vasquez – producer
- Carlos Vega – drums
- Freddie "Ready Freddie" Washington – bass
- Wild Orchid – primary artist
- Matthew Wilder – arranger, drums, keyboards, loops, producer, programming, vocal arrangement
- Larry Williams – saxophone

== Charts ==
Album - Billboard (United States)

Year	Chart	Position
1997	Heatseekers	4
1997	The Billboard 200	153
1997	Top R&B/Hip-Hop Albums	84

Singles - Billboard (United States)

Year	Single	Chart	Position
1996	"At Night I Pray"	The Billboard Hot 100	63
1996	"At Night I Pray"	Mainstream Top 40	29
1996	"At Night I Pray"	Hot R&B/Hip-Hop Singles Sales	49
1996	"At Night I Pray"	Hot R&B/Hip-Hop Songs	67
1996	"At Night I Pray"	R&B/Hip-Hop Streaming Songs	86
1997	"Talk to Me"	The Billboard Hot 100	48
1997	"Talk to Me"	Billboard Maxi Single Sales	10
1997	"Talk to Me"	Dance Singles Sales	10
1997	"Talk to Me"	Mainstream Top 40	31
1997	"Talk to Me"	Rhythmic Songs	33
1997	"Talk to Me"	Radio Songs	63
1997	"Talk to Me"	Hot R&B/Hip-Hop Singles Sales	66
1997	"Talk to Me"	Hot R&B/Hip-Hop Songs	85
1997	"Supernatural"	The Billboard Hot 100	70
1997	"Supernatural"	Bubbling Under R&B/Hip-Hop Songs	5
1998	"I Won't Play the Fool (Diva Control Mix)"	Billboard Dance Charts	5

== Accolades ==
- 1997 Billboard Video Music Award Nomination : Best Dance/Club Clip Of The Year: Talk To Me
- 1997 Billboard Video Music Award Nomination : Best Dance/Club Clip (New Artist) : Talk To Me
- 1997 Lady Of Soul Award Nomination : Best R&B/Soul or Rap Album by Group Band Or Duo : Wild Orchid
- 1997 Lady Of Soul Award Nomination : Best R&B/Soul or Rap Music Video : Talk To Me
