= Matthew Hager =

American musician

Matthew Hager is a multiplatinum American record producer, musician and songwriter.

== Early life and education ==
Originally from Houston, Texas, Hager now lives in Los Angeles. Before moving to Los Angeles, Hager studied at the prestigious Berklee College of Music. Since then, he has written and produced several number one hit singles as well as several critically acclaimed albums and has worked with many major recording artists. He has achieved unusual success crossing many genres from hard rock to jazz to teen pop.

== Career ==
In the late '90s, he was introduced to Mandy Moore and soon became Moore's musical director. He went on to write and produced her song "When I Talk To You" which is featured on Mandy Moore's multi-platinum album Mandy Moore along with her song "Split Chick" that he also produced. In addition, he produced several acoustic versions of her chart topping hits including "Walk Me Home" and "I Wanna Be With You" and arranged all live versions of her biggest hits for her U.S. and international television performances and touring for her albums So Real, I Wanna Be With You, Mandy Moore, and A Walk to Remember: Music From the Motion Picture.

After his years with Mandy Moore, Hager became a sought after songwriter in Los Angeles and wrote and produced the #1 hit song "Lucy's", which was the longest running #1 single for any debut artist in history on the Contemporary Jazz R&R chart, as well as the #1 singles "True Blue" and "Bloom". He also wrote and produced the Hot AC hit "Stars" for #1 Billboard artist Mindi Abair as well as her top 5 hits "Come As You Are", "Flirt" and "Smile". He also wrote and produced her song "Every Time" which was featured in the movie "License To Wed" and "I Can Remember" was featured in the popular Spelling Television series "Summerland". He wrote and produced the holiday smash "I Can't Wait For Christmas" with Mindi Abair that has sold nearly a million copies to date. Her chart topping and critically acclaimed albums "It Just Happens That Way", "Come As You Are", "Life Less Ordinary" and "Stars" Hager produced in their entirety.

Hager recorded "Cry Baby Cry" produced by Timbaland and "Falling Down" produced by Justin Timberlake for Duran Duran's album Red Carpet Massacre. He wrote and produced the international hit "6000 Miles" with John Taylor from Duran Duran and produced and wrote a majority of his solo album "Techno For Two". He produced the U.S. hit "Perfect Love" for Simply Red. He wrote and produced the top 20 hit "How Does It Feel" for Columbia recording artist Peter White and also performed his own song "Enough" under his name in the hit movie A Walk to Remember.

He wrote and produced the Radio Disney hit "Make History" by Alyson Stoner. "Make History" is also the opening song being performed on the Jonas Brothers, Demi Lovato, Camp Rock world tour. He also wrote and produced the single "Strange Life" for the rock band Tickle Me Pink.

According to John Taylor, Matthew is working on tracks for the February 2011 release "All You Need Is Now" from the band Duran Duran.

In addition to producing and writing, Hager is also a multi-instrumentalist who has appeared on many albums playing guitar, bass, piano, drums, percussion, string arrangements and singing. He also has appeared on and arranged several songs with Scott Weiland, the lead singer of Stone Temple Pilots and Velvet Revolver. He has written many songs for TV and Film and most recently composed and produced the theme song for the CW Show Remodled and Style Network hit shows Big Rich Texas and Wicked Fit. He also scored the Playdom/Disney video game Kogamu.

An EP of his solo material including the song "Enough" from the movie A Walk To Remember entitled "Peace Love And Animosity" was released June 2, 2009.

In 2010, Hager expanded his company 76 Steps Music to the full service entertainment company 76 Steps Entertainment which began managing actors including Lauran Irion, who plays Laura Vaughn on the ABC show GCB and has guest starred on Disney's I'm In The Band and ABC Family's Melissa And Joey.

He was the co-founder, producer, songwriter and bass player in Allison Iraheta's critically acclaimed band, Halo Circus. He also eloped with Iraheta in 2013. The band released two albums: Bunny in 2016, and Robots and Wranglers in 2018. Between 2016 and 2018, the band toured small clubs in the US. On September 25, 2019, after an 8-month silence on social media, Iraheta announced on Facebook that Halo Circus would be disbanding due to her parting ways with Hager both professionally and personally.

== Sources ==
- https://web.archive.org/web/20090531154807/http://billboard.prweb.com/releases/new_rock_pop/album_Matthew_Hager/prweb2456954.htm
- http://jazzmonthly.com/artist_hp/hager_matthew/interviews/hager_index.html
- https://www.amazon.com/s/ref=nb_ss_m?url=search-alias%3Dpopular&field-keywords=mindi+abair&x=0&y=0
