= Friday I'll Be Over U =

Single by Allison Iraheta

from the album Just like You
- Released: November 3, 2009
- Recorded: 2009
- Studio: Maratone, Stockholm, Sweden; Atlantis, Stockholm, Sweden
- Genre: Pop punk; pop rock
- Length: 3:16
- Label: 19; Jive
- Songwriters: Max Martin; Shellback; Savan Kotecha; Tiffany Amber
- Producers: Max Martin; Shellback

Allison Iraheta singles chronology
"Friday I'll Be Over U" (2009)	"Scars" (2010)

"Friday I'll Be Over U" is a song by American recording artist and American Idol season eight finalist Allison Iraheta from her debut album, Just like You. The song was written by Max Martin, Shellback, Savan Kotecha and Tiffany Amber. The single debuted on AOL's Popeater on October 5, 2009 and was made officially available through digital distribution on November 3, 2009 after being released and pulled from online distributors in early October.

== Critical reception ==
Critical reception of "Friday I'll Be Over U" has been very positive. Lyndsey Parker, of Yahoo! Music, called it a "fun 'n' feisty opener" for Iraheta's debut album Just like You, concluding that it was "arguably the best debut single by an Idol ever.". Michael Slezak of Entertainment Weekly calls the song "an aggressively jaunty kiss-off track that juxtaposes genuine hard-edged attitude from (Allison) with a chorus as unapologetically addictive as Grape Bubble Yum," concluding that it is "exactly the kind of real world, post-Idol response Allison will need to propel herself from reality TV contestant to Billboard-charting threat," even if "Martin has ironed out Allison's vocals a little too aggressively on the chorus.". MJ Santilli, who the Los Angeles Times describes as the "top" blogger for idol-watchers, writes "The tune opens with a simple Kinks-like guitar riff, giving way in the chorus to some 80's-like electronica–a cool meld of old school sounds ... Allison's husky alto is front and center here. I'm relieved her vocals weren’t pro-tooled into oblivion. Teen-friendly pop/rock is exactly what I was expecting from Allison right out of the gate."

Reviewers from publications which do not primarily cover Idol-related works have also praised the song. Lehigh Valley Music writer John J. Moser describes the song as "rock-oriented (with) a very heavy pop production to make it uber-catchy." Jenny Kobiela-Mondor of FW Daily News said that "Friday I'll Be Over U" "reminds me of Kelly Clarkson, but a twinge edgier ... a solid song for teens, and one that I'm sure many girls will be singing loudly in their bedrooms and their cars." Kieran Layton, the Arts and Entertainment Editor for The Pitt News, praises the single for painting Allison "as a standout rock chick who comes across as the love child of Pink, Kelly Clarkson and Courtney Love circa her Hole days," describing the song as a "treat."

On December 22, 2009, Pop Justice selected "Friday I'll Be Over U" as its song of the day.

== Music video ==
The music video premiered on Yahoo! Music on November 18, 2009. The music video has been very well received. Lyndsey Parker of Yahoo! Music wrote,

...'Friday I'll Be Over U' is so totally tubular, it seems like something Martha Quinn might have back-announced back in MTV's brick-walled basement infancy. It's pretty much the awesomest '80s-homage video since Stone Temple Pilots' 'Big Bang Baby,' ... Complete with Cheap Trick checkerboards, Synchronicity primary-color paint slashes, and even some sketch animation that makes Allison resemble either the love interest in A-ha's iconic 'Take On Me' video or a 2D Patrick Nagel vixen come to life, 'FIBOU' is a fun-filled retro romp back to the more innocent '80s days Allison missed out on ... And in the clip, Allison is at her Benatar-channeling best..."

Andrea Reiher of Zap2it, praised the video as well, writing,

What a great video. It's like a cross between A-Ha's "Take On Me" and something out of the Dire Straits oeuvre. We love the irony that the born-in-1992 Idol has a video straight out of 1983. Fantastic. In all the hoopla surrounding Kris Allen and Adam Lambert's first albums, we'd forgotten how catchy Allison's debut single is. We think with the right songs she could become the next Idol female pop star. They really haven't had one since Kelly Clarkson. (Carrie Underwood's too country to be considered pop.) Here's hoping, Allison!"

The music video was made available for purchase via iTunes on November 24, 2009.

== Track listing ==
- Digital download
1. "Friday I'll Be Over U" – 3:16

== Personnel ==
- Songwriting – Max Martin, Shellback, Savan Kotecha, Tiffany Amber
- Production – Max Martin, Shellback
- Recording – Max Martin, Shellback, Michael Ilbert
- Mixing – Serban Ghenea
- Mix engineering – John Hanes
- Assistant mix engineering – Tim Roberts
- Drums, guitar and bass – Shellback
- Keyboards – Max Martin
- Vocals – Allison Iraheta
- Mastering – Tom Coyne

== Sales ==
Year	Title	Sales
2009	"Friday I'll Be Over U"	54,000

== Other versions ==
Iraheta recorded a version of the song in Spanish, named "El Viernes Te Olvido Yo" ("Friday I'll Forget You"), which was leaked online in early November. It was released on Latin radio and as a track of the deluxe version of Just like You on iTunes.

== Release history ==
Country	Release date
United States	November 3, 2009
United Kingdom	May 3, 2010
