= Olivia Bonilla =

American singer-songwriter and musician

- Born: Olivia Brooks Bonilla; January 25, 1992 (age 33); San Diego, California, United States
- Genres: Pop, pop rock
- Occupations: Singer-songwriter, musician
- Instruments: Vocals, guitar, piano
- Years active: 2006–present
- Website: oliviabonilla.com

Olivia Brooks Bonilla (born January 25, 1992) is an American singer-songwriter and musician. In 2009, she released her EP-Album Arrival featuring original songs "Can't Say Goodbye", "Stumble", and "Don't Say You're Sorry". Soon after that, she released "As If You Never Existed", a song inspired by New Moon, the second novel in the Twilight series. In 2010, she released her first single "Not This Time" and "Nunca Más" (Spanish version) off her upcoming full-length album, which is set to be released in 2011.

== Early life ==
Bonilla was born in San Diego, California, and is of German, Italian, and Hispanic ethnic background. She is the youngest in her family, with two older siblings, Crystal and Oscar. She grew up listening to The Beatles, Simon & Garfunkel, Neil Diamond, The Beach Boys, and many others thanks to her dad.

Bonilla started singing at the age of 10 in her local church choir. Although she participated in many local festivals and singing contests, it wasn't until the age of 14 that she began to take vocal lessons. At 15 she began to play the guitar and wrote her first song, "Can't Say Goodbye". Her musical inspirations include Coldplay, The Beatles, Alexz Johnson, Paramore, and later Taylor Swift.

== Music career ==
=== 2006 ===
At the age of 14, Bonilla made her television debut in the Telemundo reality singing show competition, Quinceañera: Mamá Quiero Ser Artista (Sweet Fifteen: Mom, I Want to be an Artist), which was produced and broadcast in 2006. On the show, a group of teenage girls such as Allison Iraheta, Brissia Mayagoitia, and others of Hispanic and Latino American background competed in a singing competition for the main prize of $50,000 and a recording contract. Although Bonilla did not win the competition, she was one of the finalists.

Week #	Song Choice	Original Artist	Result
Opening #	"I Will Survive"	Gloria Gaynor	
1	"Desesperada"	Marta Sánchez	Advanced
2	"Me Equivoqué"	Mariana Seoane	Advanced
3	"Bandido"	Ana Bárbara	Eliminated
4	"La Muerte Del Palomo"	Juan Gabriel	Backup vocalist
5	"Antología"	Shakira	Backup vocalist
Opening #	"Material Girl" / "Like a Virgin"	Madonna	
6	"Kiss and Say Goodbye"	The Manhattans	Backup vocalist
7	"Crazy in Love"	Beyoncé Knowles	Backup vocalist
8	"La Playa"	La Oreja de Van Gogh	Advanced
Opening #	"Mamma Mia"	ABBA	
9	"Mirame"	Sentidos Opuestos	Advanced
Opening #	"Girls Just Want to Have Fun"	Cyndi Lauper	
10	"Los Laureles"	Various Artists	Eliminated
"Finale"	Color Esperanza	Diego Torres	

=== 2009–10 ===
In 2009, Bonilla released her EP-Album Arrival featuring her original songs "Can't Say Goodbye", "Stumble", "Don't Say You're Sorry". Soon after that, she released "As If You Never Existed", a song inspired by New Moon, the second novel in the Twilight series.

Almost a year later, in 2010 Bonilla released her first single "Not This Time" and "Nunca Más" (Spanish version) off her upcoming full-length album. Soon after, Bonilla filmed and released the official music videos for both versions of the single, via YouTube. The album is set to be released in 2011 and it will feature all her own original material.

During promotion for the new single, Bonilla attended the Billboard Latin Music Awards where she was invited to perform a couple of songs from her new album.

She traveled to Mexico City for a promotional tour with media outlets in television, radio, and print such as Televisa and Notimex. She made television appearances in TV shows such as El Mundo al Revés con Natalia on TeleHit, Telehit News, La Sobremesa, and Pock Studio. During her visit to México, Bonilla performed and received recognition at Plaza de las Estrellas (the Mexican equivalent of the Hollywood Walk of Fame). She also held a private concert in popular club called "La Casona".

In late 2010, Bonilla traveled to Spain where she continued her media promotional tour and also performed as the opening act for Spanish singer David Sampedro at "El Gran Teatro de Elche" in Alicante, Spain. During her trip there, she visited radio stations such as EsRadio and Onda Cero Radio where she talked about the meaning behind her songs and her upcoming album, which is soon to be released in 2011.

In November 2010, Bonilla's original song, "Not This Time" was nominated as "Best Pop Song of 2010" by the Hollywood Music in Media Awards.

== Discography ==
=== Extended plays ===
Year	Title	Track listing
2009	Arrival (digital download)	"Don't Say You're Sorry"; "Stumble"; "Can't Say Goodbye"

=== Singles ===
- 2009: "As If You Never Existed"
- 2010: "Not This Time"
- 2010: "Nunca Más" (Spanish version of "Not This Time")

=== Music videos ===
- 2010:"Not This Time"
- 2010: "Nunca Más"
