= Don't Waste the Pretty =

Single by Allison Iraheta featuring Orianthi

from the album Just Like You
- Released: June 8, 2010
- Recorded: 2010
- Genre: Pop punk; pop rock
- Length: 3:28
- Label: 19; Jive
- Songwriters: Michael Dennis Smith; Stefanie Ridel; Miriam Nervo; Olivia Nervo
- Producer: Howard Benson

Allison Iraheta singles chronology
"Scars" (2010)	"Don't Waste the Pretty" (2010)

"Don't Waste the Pretty" is the third single by Allison Iraheta of her debut album Just Like You. It was written by Michael Dennis Smith, Stefanie Ridel, Miriam Nervo and Olivia Nervo and was produced by Howard Benson. The single version of the song, featuring Orianthi on guitar, made its online debut on EW.com and Zap2it.com on June 2, 2010 and was released digitally on June 8, 2010. It was released to radio stations on June 22, 2010.

== Promotion ==
Iraheta performed the original version of "Don't Waste the Pretty" on Lopez Tonight on Wednesday, May 26, 2010, and the acoustic version of the song on Z100 New York on June 22, 2010. She performed the track with Orianthi and Adam Lambert on the Glam Nation Tour in 2010. Iraheta and Orianthi performed the song on the Thursday, July 29, 2010, results episode of So You Think You Can Dance.

== Reception ==
Reception of the new version of "Don't Waste the Pretty" has been mainly positive. Entertainment Weekly's Michael Slezak concluded that "Don't Waste the Pretty" finds Iraheta "at her gravelly, soulful best, paired with a killer hook and an empowering message that certainly can’t hurt a generation of kids who’ll be spending their summers singing along to “Can’t Be Tamed” and “Rude Boy.”

Billboard writes that "'Don't Waste the Pretty' deserves to become for Iraheta what "Whataya Want From Me" was for Adam Lambert—a breakthrough record for an 'Idol' alum with outsize talent."

AOL Radio writer Matthew Wilkening writes that "Orianthi's soloing adds dramatic tension to the country-tinged, mid-tempo pop song as Iraheta advises a friend not to take verbal abuse from her partner"

Rodney Ho from the Atlanta Journal-Constitution calls Iraheta "a really talented singer" and hopes "that radio embraces this song, which is pretty catchy," adding that "top 40 program directors should give it a spin."

Zap2it Blogger Andrea Reiher praised the new version of the song, writing "We already loved this song, but it's even better with Orianthi's sick guitar licks in the accompaniment."

== Music video ==
There is no official music video for "Don't Waste the Pretty". However, Jive did release a video titled "The Journey to Don't Waste the Pretty". This video is backstage footage of Iraheta, her band, and Orianthi. It is intercut with scenes of Iraheta performing the song on stage at different gigs (which is in sync with the track).

== Sales ==
Year	Title	Sales
2010	"Don't Waste the Pretty"	4,000

== Other versions ==
The original version of "Don't Waste the Pretty" appears on Iraheta's debut album Just Like You as the fourth track and does not feature Orianthi.

Iraheta has also performed the song acoustically on Entertainment Weekly's online show Realite, Yahoo! Music, Radio Disney and Z100 New York. She released the acoustic version of the song for download on June 8, 2010.
