= Allison Iraheta =

American singer (born 1992)

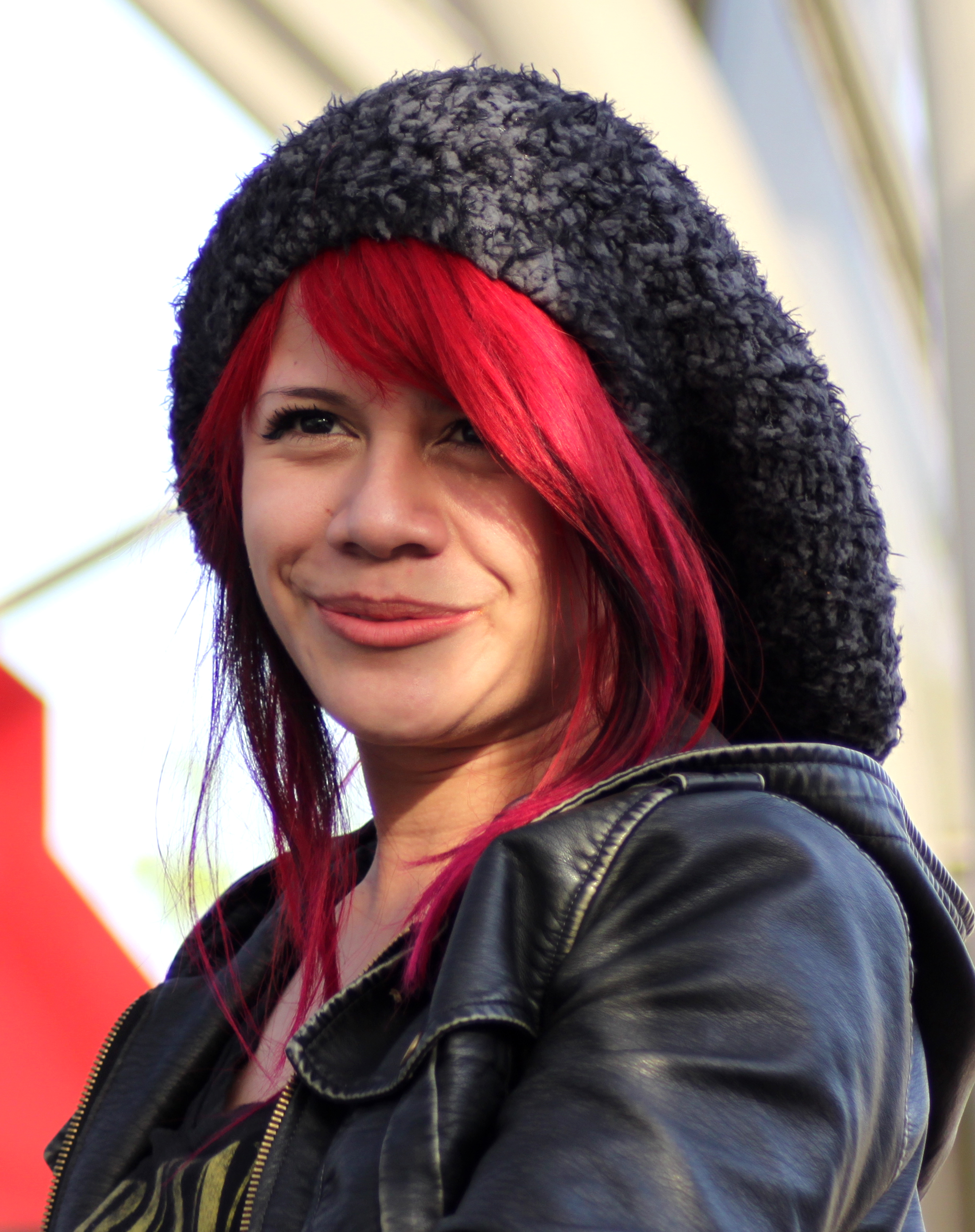
- Iraheta in March 2010

Background information
- Born: April 27, 1992 (age 34); Glendale, California, United States
- Origin: Los Angeles, California
- Genre: Pop rock
- Occupation: Singer
- Instruments: Vocals; guitar
- Years active: 2006–present
- Labels: 19; Jive (2009–2010)
- Member of: Fuhm
- Formerly of: Halo Circus

Allison Iraheta (/ˈaɪrəhiːtə/; born April 27, 1992) is an American singer who was the fourth place finalist on the eighth season of American Idol. Prior to Idol, Iraheta won the Telemundo competition Quinceañera: Mamá Quiero Ser Artista. Following the conclusion of Idol, Iraheta was signed to a record deal with 19 Entertainment and Jive Records. Her debut album Just like You was released on December 1, 2009. She was also the lead singer of the band Halo Circus.

== Biography ==
Iraheta was born in Glendale, California, to Salvadoran immigrants who moved to the United States before she was born. She is the youngest in the family, with two older siblings, Jacki and Carlos Iraheta. According to her family, she has been singing since she was a toddler. In 2001, she began taking voice lessons with Raphael Enriquez at the Los Angeles Music and Art School, a non-profit community school of the arts in East Los Angeles. Before rising to prominence, she was a frequent performer at the local Latin Electronics Store La Curaçao and the Los Angeles Music and Art School's annual benefit concert, Stars for the Arts. Iraheta attended Los Angeles' Animo Ralph Bunche Charter High School. Iraheta studied with performance coaches Pepper Jay and John Michael Ferrari from 2004 to 2009, and performed during that time with the "oldies" band, "Ferrari & Friends."

=== Quinceañera: Mamá Quiero Ser Artista (2006–2007) ===
In 2007, Iraheta won the reality show, "Quinceañera: Mama Quiero Ser Artista" (Sweet Fifteen: Mom, I Want to be an Artist), a reality TV singing competition that was produced and broadcast in 2006-2007 on Telemundo, where she sang in both English and Spanish.

On the show, a group of teenage girls such as Olivia Bonilla, Brissia Mayagoitia, and others of Latin background competed in a singing competition for the main prize of $50,000 and a record deal. Iraheta was the first (and only) winner of the competition and received the grand prize, but due to legal problems of the show the recording contract was never finalized and the production of the show was closed.

Week #	Song choice	Original artist	Result
Unknown	"Antología"	Shakira	Advanced
Unknown	"La muerte del palomo"	Juan Gabriel	Advanced
Unknown	"Crazy in Love"	Beyoncé	Advanced
Unknown	"Kiss and Say Goodbye"	The Manhattans	Advanced
Unknown	"Volverte a Amar"	Alejandra Guzmán	Advanced
Unknown	"Sin él"	Marisela	Advanced
Unknown	"Mi historia entre tus dedos"	Gianluca Grignani	Advanced
Unknown	"Cielo rojo"	Lola Beltrán	Advanced
Finale	"Total Eclipse of the Heart"	Bonnie Tyler	Winner

=== American Idol (2009) ===
Iraheta auditioned for the eighth season of American Idol in San Francisco in 2009. She sang "(You Make Me Feel Like) A Natural Woman" by Aretha Franklin and made it to the Hollywood audition rounds. The judges unanimously agreed to put her through to the semifinals, with Simon Cowell saying "keep your eye on that one" and Paula Abdul predicting that Iraheta would be a "dark horse" in the competition.

Judges Simon Cowell and Randy Jackson declared Iraheta to be "one to watch in this competition" after her rendition of Heart's "Alone" during the semifinals. For her performance, Iraheta earned unanimous praise from the judges, with Abdul praising her for being able to "sing the telephone book". Iraheta was the top vote-getting female of Group 2 and, along with Kris Allen and Adam Lambert, advanced directly from the semifinals.

Iraheta kicked off her run in the finals with a well-received performance of Michael Jackson's "Give In to Me". Once again, Abdul praised Iraheta for being a "rock star," with the rest of the panel in agreement. The following week, Iraheta performed "Blame It On Your Heart" by Patty Loveless. Iraheta received rave reviews from the judges, but landed in the Bottom 3 for the first time. On Motown Night, Iraheta performed a cover of the Temptations' "Papa Was a Rollin' Stone". The performance earned a standing ovation from mentor Smokey Robinson, as well as further praise from the judges. DioGuardi enthusiastically lauded Iraheta for having a voice that "comes from God...you can't teach that! You sing like you've been singing for 400 years!"

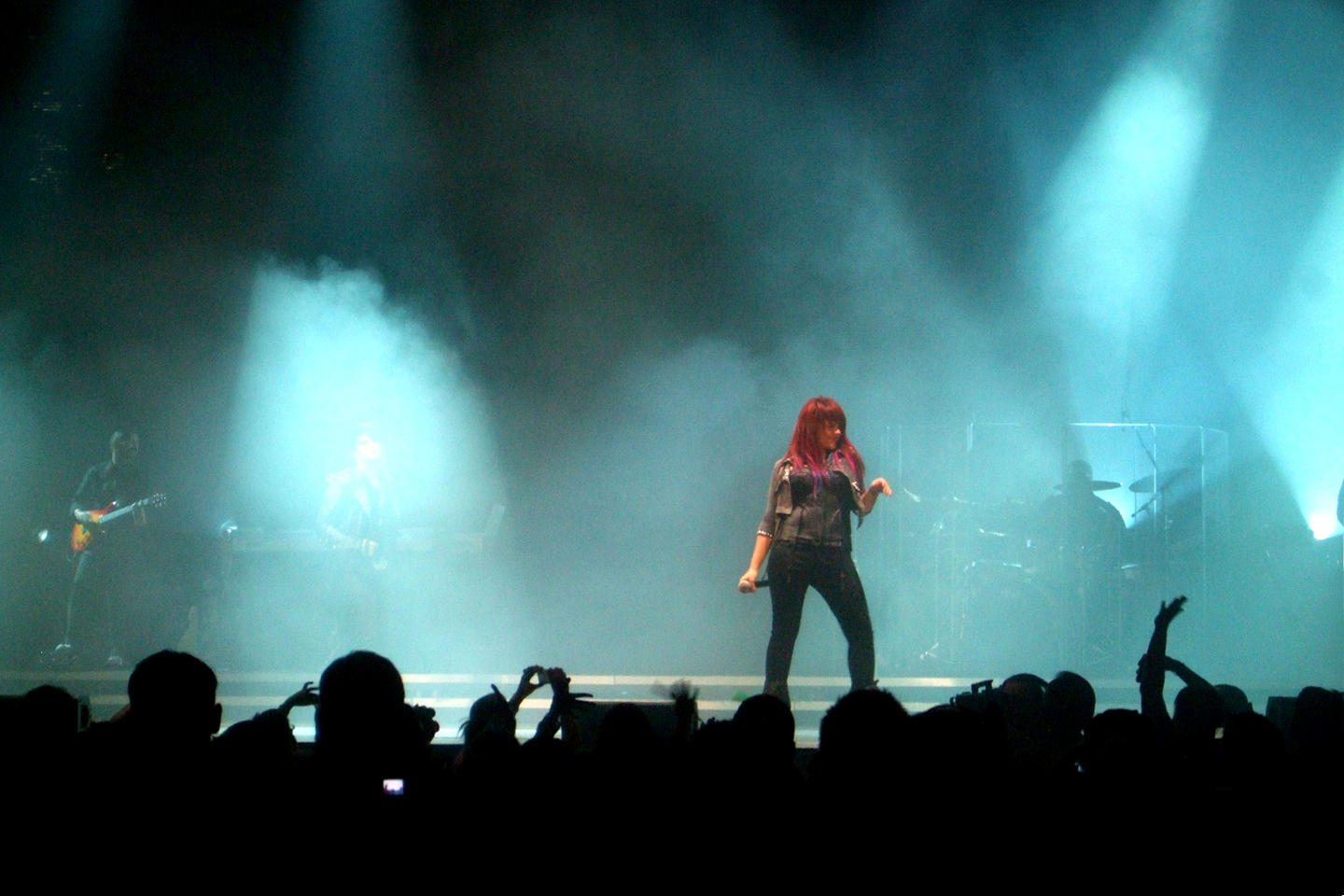
Iraheta performing during the American Idols Live! Tour 2009.

On Top Downloads night, Iraheta performed No Doubt's "Don't Speak" while accompanying herself on the guitar and ended up in the Bottom 3 again. For her performance during Top 8 week, Iraheta sang Bonnie Raitt's "I Can't Make You Love Me", for which she received much acclaim. Jackson compared her to first season winner Kelly Clarkson, and DioGuardi commented, "You know what? Let's go make a record!" After covering "I Don't Want to Miss a Thing" during Movie Night, Cowell boldly stated "We can see you all the way through the end now. You are the girls' only hope [of winning this competition.]" Abdul compared her to fellow contestant Adam Lambert, saying that the two possessed the same "special sauce."

During the second Top 7 Night (due to the judges' save of Matt Giraud), Iraheta performed a rock-infused version of Donna Summer's "Hot Stuff". Emerging on a glowing, red staircase, Iraheta was praised by Cowell for delivering "a brilliant performance". DioGuardi also praised Iraheta by saying, "That was like a 9–10 for me!" The following night, Iraheta again landed in the bottom 3 for the third time, and Lil Rounds was eliminated from the competition, leaving Iraheta as the last remaining female contestant. The next week, Iraheta performed a widely acclaimed cover of "Someone to Watch Over Me" as part of the Rat Pack theme. Jackson compared her vocal ability to Pink, "but with 9,000 more octaves", while DioGuardi remarked, "you converted some fans tonight... If that doesn't land you in the finals, I don't know what will!". During the subsequent results show, it was revealed that Iraheta was among the Top 2 vote-getters (along with Danny Gokey) for the night.

The following week, Iraheta performed a solo version of "Cry Baby" and closed the show with "Slow Ride", a duet with Adam Lambert. Regarding her performance of "Cry Baby", Cowell remarked that her growth throughout the competition was "staggering", and praised her for her "complete confidence and terrific vocals". Her duet of "Slow Ride" with Lambert received further praise from the judges, with DioGuardi describing her as a "rock goddess". Mentor Slash commented that Iraheta possessed a better voice than most women "twice her age".

On May 6, 2009, Iraheta was eliminated from the competition in 4th place. Slash tweeted that "Alison [sic] didn't deserve to be voted off AI so soon, she has amazing potential." Similarly, American Idol music director Rickey Minor was "absolutely shocked" at her departure.

Week #	Theme	Song choice	Artist	Order #	Result
Audition	Auditioner's Choice	"(You Make Me Feel Like) A Natural Woman"	Aretha Franklin	N/A	Advanced
Hollywood	First Solo	[Not aired]		N/A	Advanced
Hollywood	Group Performance	[Not aired]		N/A	Advanced
Hollywood	Second Solo	"Because of You"	Kelly Clarkson	N/A	Advanced
Top 36/Semi-Final 2	Billboard Hot 100 Hits to Date	"Alone"	i-TEN	5	Advanced
Top 13	Michael Jackson	"Give In to Me"	Michael Jackson	7	Safe
Top 11	Grand Ole Opry	"Blame It on Your Heart"	Patty Loveless	2	Bottom 3^{1}
Top 10	Motown	"Papa Was a Rollin' Stone"	The Undisputed Truth	10	Safe
Top 9	Top Downloads	"Don't Speak"	No Doubt	4	Bottom 3^{1}
Top 8	Year They Were Born	"I Can't Make You Love Me"	Bonnie Raitt	6	Safe
Top 7	Songs from the Cinema	"I Don't Want to Miss a Thing" – Armageddon	Aerosmith	1	Safe
Top 7^{2}	Disco	"Hot Stuff"	Donna Summer	4	Bottom 3
Top 5	Rat Pack Standards	"Someone to Watch Over Me"	Gertrude Lawrence	2	Safe
Top 4	Rock and roll Solo; Duet	"Cry Baby" "Slow Ride" with Adam Lambert	Garnet Mimms; Foghat	2; 6	Eliminated

- ^Note 1 Iraheta was saved first from elimination.
- ^Note 2 Due to the judges using their one save to save Matt Giraud, the Top 7 remained intact for another week.

=== Just like You (2009–2012) ===
After her elimination, Iraheta made guest appearances on Live with Regis and Kelly, The Ellen DeGeneres Show, The Tonight Show with Conan O'Brien, Larry King Live, as well as local Fox television affiliates and numerous radio stations across the country. She performed on the Grand Finale of American Idol season 8, including a group medley of "So What" and a duet of "Time After Time" with original artist Cyndi Lauper.

On June 9, 2009, following weeks of speculation, it was officially confirmed that Iraheta had signed a record deal with Jive Records and 19 Recordings. Since Iraheta finished 4th place in American Idol season 8, she participated in American Idols LIVE! Tour 2009, performing "So What" by Pink, "Cry Baby" by Janis Joplin, "Barracuda" by Heart, and "Slow Ride" (with Adam Lambert) by Foghat. Iraheta also performed "Barracuda" by Heart on The Tonight Show with Conan O'Brien on July 15, 2009 to promote the tour. In September 2009, Allison concluded the 50 city tour with her fellow Idol contestants, during which she began recording her debut album, Just like You, under Jive Records, working with Kevin Rudolf, David Hodges, Tommy Henriksen and Max Martin

Iraheta's debut album was released December 1, 2009. The lead single "Friday I'll Be Over U", produced by Max Martin, debuted on October 5, 2009 and was made available through digital distribution on November 3, 2009. According to Rolling Stone, Jive expected Allison to sell 75,000 copies of her album in the first week. The album sold approximately 32,000 copies in its first week, debuting at number 35 on the Billboard 200 album chart. Approximately 7,000 of the copies sold in the first week were sold digitally, resulting in a debut at number 14 on the Billboard Digital Albums Chart. Allison's song "Pieces" was featured on the January 13th episode of American Idol. Allison performed her second single "Scars" on American Idol's Season 9 Top 24 results show on February 25, 2010.

In April 2010, it was announced Iraheta would be opening for Adam Lambert on his 2010 "GlamNation Tour". Allison and Australian guitarist Orianthi shared opening act duties on the initial North American leg of the tour. She performed songs from "Just like You" for 71 of the 74 dates from June through September 2010. On the dates that included Orianthi, her typical set included "Holiday," "Scars/Don't Waste the Pretty" (with Orianthi usually playing lead guitar for the latter, as she does on the album), "Robot Love," a cover of Pat Benatar's "Heartbreaker" and "Friday I'll Be Over U." She would usually add three songs on the nights where she was the only opening act. On Orianthi's final appearance on the tour, Iraheta and her band came onstage, playing air guitar and sweeping up with brooms. For Iraheta's final date on the tour, September 21, 2010 in Puyallup, Washington, Adam Lambert and his dancers covered her with silly string and carried her offstage.

In a July 2010 interview with Beatweek nagazine, Iraheta stated that she would be writing more material for her second album and that it would be much more 'personal'. She stated: "So I think I'm gonna get more personal when I start writing." Iraheta was dropped by record label Jive Records in September 2010, due to her debut album underperforming. She was also dropped from 19 Entertainment. She then began writing music for her second album. On March 1, 2012, one of Iraheta's new songs, titled "Self-Control", was featured in a video for Skaist-Taylor.

=== Halo Circus (2013–2019) ===
On January 3, 2013, Iraheta announced on her Twitter account that she had formed a new band called Halo Circus. The band consisted of Iraheta (vocals), Matthew Hager (bass, keyboards), David Immerman (guitars) and Valerie Franco (drums). The band marked a change of musical direction for Iraheta following a hiatus in 2012, a time which she used to "regroup, find herself and rediscover her voice." Halo Circus played their first gig at The Troubadour in West Hollywood, California on January 26, 2013. Iraheta eloped with bass player, Matthew Hager the next day, January 27, 2013. They played their second gig at Whisky a Go Go on April 17 and their third gig at the Hotel Café on May 21, 2013. On May 30, 2013, footage from their Hotel Café performance, along with an interview with Iraheta and Hager was featured on the NBC Latino website. In the interview, Hager said "Allison happens to be one of the finest vocalists I've ever heard on every level". In June 2013, drummer Valerie Franco left the band and was replaced by Veronica Bellino. In July 2013, the band signed a deal with the Manimal Vinyl label and released their first single, "Gone", via iTunes on October 8, 2013. On July 15, 2014, Halo Circus released their second single, a cover of Duran Duran's "Do You Believe in Shame?". This release was met to very positive reviews from critics, and was included in a Duran Duran tribute album, Making Patterns Rhyme. This was available digitally on October 24, 2014 and released on vinyl by Manimal Records on October 28, 2014. Their debut album, Bunny, was released on June 23, 2016. Between 2016 and 2018, the band toured small clubs in the US.

In March 2018, Halo Circus released their second album, Robots and Wranglers. On September 25, 2019, after an 8-month silence on social media, Iraheta announced on Facebook that Halo Circus would be disbanding due to her parting ways with Hager both professionally and personally.

=== Fuhm (2020–present) ===
Iraheta returned to music in October 2020 as a member of the three-piece band Fuhm, along with former Halo Circus members Matteo Eyia and Brian Stead. The band's first and only single, "Send Out the Clown", was released on October 16, 2020. In the summer of 2025, she was a backup singer for Kelly Clarkson's residency, Kelly Clarkson: Studio Sessions, in Las Vegas.

== Backing band ==
- Matthew Hager – bass, keyboards (2013–2019)
- David Immerman – lead guitar, backing vocals (2009–2015)
- Valerie Franco – drums, backing vocals (2009–2013)
- Liz Anne Hill – bass, backing vocals (2010)
- Gerry Mattei – keyboards, backing vocals (2010)
- Brian Stead – lead guitar, backing vocals (2015–2018)
- Veronica Bellino – drums, backing vocals (2013-2016)
- Matteo Eyia – drums, backing vocals (2016)

== Discography ==
=== Studio albums ===
==== Studio albums as a solo artist ====
Year	Album details	Peak positions		Certifications (sales threshold)
Year	Album details	US	US Digital	Certifications (sales threshold)
2009	Just like You: Release date: December 1, 2009; Label: Jive Records/19 Recordings; Format: CD, digital download	35	14	US sales: 103,000

==== Studio albums as lead singer of Halo Circus ====
Year	Album details	Peak positions		Certifications (sales threshold)
Year	Album details	US	US Digital	Certifications (sales threshold)
2016	Bunny: Release date: June 23, 2016; Format: CD, digital download	-	-	
2018	Robots and Wranglers: Release date: March 16, 2018; Format: CD, digital download	-	-	

=== Singles ===
Year	Single	Peak	Album	Sales
Year	Single	US	Album	Sales
2009	"Friday I'll Be Over U"	—	Just like You	54,000
2010	"Scars"	—	Just like You	20,000
2010	"Don't Waste the Pretty (feat. Orianthi)"	—	Just like You	4,000
"—" denotes releases that did not chart

=== Other charted songs ===
Year	Single	Peak	Album	Sales
Year	Single	US	Album	Sales
2009	"Slow Ride" (with Adam Lambert)	105	American Idol performances	34,000

=== Music videos ===
Year	Title
2009	"Friday I'll Be Over U"

== Songs in other media ==
Year	Title	Type	Song
2010	American Idol	TV series episode: "Atlanta Auditions"	"Pieces"
2010	Audition Online	PC Game	"Friday I'll Be Over U"
2010	Monster High	TV animated special	"Friday I'll Be Over U"
2010	Monster High	TV animated special	"Scars" "Theme song "

== Awards and nominations ==
Year	Presenter	Award	Result
2009	Teen Choice Awards	Choice Summer Tour (shared with American Idol Top 10)	Nominated
