= Stefanie Ridel =

American singer and actress (born 1973)

- Born: Stefanie Jill Ridel; May 17, 1973 (age 53); Los Angeles, California, U.S.
- Occupations: Singer, songwriter, actress
- Years active: 1983–present
- Television: Great Pretenders
- Spouse: Ron Fair (m. 2001)
- Musical career
- Genres: Pop, R&B
- Labels: Sony, RCA, Yellow Brick
- Formerly of: Wild Orchid
- Website: www.stefanieridel.com

Stefanie Jill Ridel (born May 17, 1973) is an American singer and actress. She was a member of the girl group Wild Orchid, and was a co-host of the television show Great Pretenders.

== Early life ==
Stefanie Jill Ridel was born in Hollywood, California. She has two brothers, Mark and Chris Ridel.

== Acting career ==
Ridel is best known as a co-host of the TV show Great Pretenders. From 1983 to 2004 she made various appearances singing on television, mostly with Wild Orchid. Her acting career began on commercials and landing guest star roles on TV shows like The Facts Of Life, The Golden Girls, Punky Brewster, Married... with Children, and Blossom. She lent her singing voice to the character, Yasmin in the film Bratz.

== Personal life ==
Ridel is married to music executive Ron Fair, the couple has four children.

In June 2024 Ridel was arrested for DUI in Tennessee by the Tennessee State Police however her bloodwork would later prove that she had no alcohol in her system and her charge was dropped. In 2026 she was awarded $70,000 in damages related to wrongful arrest.

== Music career ==
In 1991, a girl group called NRG was formed. They were a quartet made up of Ridel, Heather Holyoak, and Stacy Ferguson, and Renee Sands of Kids Incorporated. They were signed to Sony Records that year, and changed their name to Wild Orchid. Soon Heather left the group for college and was replaced by Micki Duran, also a Kids Incorporated alumni. They recorded a debut album, but Micki soon left the group to pursue acting, and they were dropped from Sony. They signed to RCA Records, and recorded their self-titled debut album, which was released in 1996. Their second album, Oxygen, was released in 1998, and they recorded Fire in 2000.

It was leaked to the internet and they were dropped from RCA in 2001. Ferguson left the group, and they became a duo as they opened Yellow Brick Records. Hypnotic was released on the internet in 2003, and the band then broke up in 2004. She took a short break from music before she and Kyle Hendricks, under the stage name Rain, created the band, 5th Element. She also produced and wrote for The Slumber Party Girls. She produced tracks for Prima J. 5th Element has released a debut album, Here Comes the Rain Again, and Stefanie co-founded Talent Bootcamp, a camp training today's greatest music sensations.

She contributed to the Bratz movie soundtrack in 2007.

== Discography ==
=== with Wild Orchid ===
==== Albums ====
- Wild Orchid (1996)
- Oxygen (1998)
- Hypnotic (2003)

==== Singles ====
- "At Night I Pray" (1996)
- "Talk to Me" (1997)
- "Supernatural" (1997)
- "Follow Me" (1997)
- "Be Mine" (1998)
- "Stuttering (Don't Say)" (2001)

=== With 5th Element ===
==== Singles ====
- "2 Nite"
- "Deeper"
- "Judgment Day"
- "Follow Me"
- "Just Another Day"
- "Just Groove"
- "Underbelly"
- "Happy"
- "I Won't Walk Away"
- "Here Comes the Rain Again Remixes"

=== Soundtrack contributions ===
- Bratz: Motion Picture Soundtrack (2007)

=== As songwriter ===
- Bratz: The Movie (2007)
- Hannah Montana: The Movie (2009)
- "Don't Waste The Pretty" (2010) - Allison Iraheta

== Television work ==
- The Facts of Life (1 episode, 1983)
- Punky Brewster (1 episode, 1985)
- The Golden Girls (1 episode, 1989)
- Oh Henry! ...Megan (1989)
- Blossom (2 episode, 1991 & 1993)...Barbara Jenkins and Melissa Alter
- Cutters ...Fawn (1993)
- Joe's Life ...Karen (1993)
- Married... with Children (1 episode, 1994) ...Lisa Pruner
- Locals...Kris (1994)
- Goode Behavior ...Stefanie (1996)
- Great Pretenders ...Herself as Co-Host (unknown episodes, 1998)
