= Just like You (Allison Iraheta album) =

Studio album by Allison Iraheta
- Released: December 1, 2009
- Recorded: 2009
- Genres: Pop rock; teen pop
- Length: 44:21
- Labels: 19; Jive
- Producers: Max Martin; Shellback; Howard Benson; Toby Gad; Sam Watters; Louis Biancaniello; Dave Bassett; Dreamlab; Ron Aniello; Oak Felder; Uncle Josh; Sterling Simms; Kevin Rudolf; Greg Wells; Mitch Allan; David Hodges

Singles from Just like You
- 1. "Friday I'll Be Over U" Released: November 3, 2009; 2. "Scars" Released: March 9, 2010; 3. "Don't Waste the Pretty" Released: June 8, 2010

Just like You is the debut studio album from American Idol's eighth season contestant Allison Iraheta. It was released on December 1, 2009 through Jive Records and 19 Recordings. The lead single, "Friday I'll Be Over U", produced by Max Martin, debuted on AOL's Popeater on October 5, 2009, and was made available through digital distribution on November 3, 2009.

== Development ==
While on the American Idols LIVE! Tour 2009, Iraheta began writing and recording with pop and rock hit makers such as Kevin Rudolf, Howard Benson, Max Martin and David Hodges. Fellow Idol alumnus Chris Daughtry also contributed a track for the deluxe version of the album.

Idol judge Kara DioGuardi, who co-wrote "No One Else" with Pink and producer/songwriter Greg Wells, explained that "No One Else" ended up on the album after "Pink's A&R person ... played (the song) for Allison as well as the producer" and that she "wrote another song for (Just like You)," called "Spring Cleaning," which did not make the album. "No One Else" has been around for five years, but Dioguardi wanted to "hold on to it" because in the past, she had given a song out just to release it, without considering whether the artist could convey the emotion she wanted the song to convey.

On November 4, Michael Slezak of Entertainment Weekly published the list of writer and producer credits, which reveals that Iraheta will cover "Holiday", a punk rock song written and performed by Rock Star: Supernova finalist Dilana.

== Promotion ==
Following the tour, Iraheta began promoting Just like You, conducting interviews with Walmart.com soundcheck, KIIS-FM and Entertainment Weekly.

Iraheta also hosted an eight-minute block prior to the showing of New Moon in 1,200 theaters across the U.S. Iraheta talked about the upcoming album, playing some tracks, including "Friday I'll Be Over U", "Pieces", and "Trouble Is".

MySpace Music and AOL Listening Party both featured streams of "Just like You" in the days leading up to the album's release, December 1, 2009, although only AOL Listening Party features all 13 tracks.

She appeared on Good Morning America on the album's release date, December 1 and also appeared on Jimmy Kimmel Live! on December 17 after Adam Lambert was cancelled as well as The Ellen DeGeneres Show on December 7. In addition she was a special guest at Z100's Jingle Ball.

Iraheta also toured with Adam Lambert and Orianthi on the Glam Nation Tour in the summer of 2010. She was scheduled to tour for only half of the tour, but due to popular demand was extended.

Some songs from the album, particularly "Scars" and "Friday I’ll Be Over U", were featured prominently in the 2010 animated television special, Monster High: New Ghoul @ School.

== Critical reception ==
Professional ratings
Review scores
Source	Rating
Access Hollywood	(positive)
Allmusic	3/5 stars
Billboard	(positive)
Boston Globe	(positive)
Entertainment Weekly	(A−)
Houston Chronicle	2.5/4 stars
People	3/4 stars
USA Today	3/4 stars
Wall Street Journal	(positive)
Yahoo! Music	(positive)

Just like You received generally favorable reviews. Entertainment Weekly writer Michael Slezak gave the album an A−, writing that "the muscular, instantly recognizable growl that carried her to a fourth-place finish on American Idol's eighth season is all she needs to seamlessly wed a collection of first-rate ditties...."

Brian Mansfield from USA Today gave the album three out of four stars, writing "Iraheta's album may not be the best from an American Idol Season 8 alum...but it's definitely the most fun, grounded in a tradition of teen pop that goes back decades. ...Iraheta rocks out with vengeful edge she rarely displayed on the show."

Sarah Rodman of the Boston Globe stated, "The boys got most of the attention on American Idol last season, but fourth-place finisher Allison Iraheta has the last laugh with the most consistent debut album thus far." While the review states that the album is "a fresh and sassy debut mixing catchy girl-power pop with rock flourishes, perfect for Top 40 radio," it also states that "there are a couple of lyrical duds - including the musically arresting but cringe-inducing 'Robot Love,' a rant against a boyfriend’s technology addiction."

In a mixed review, New York Times described Just like You as "a workmanlike pop album with shrewdly punky touches, like a ready-made outfit from the mall chain Hot Topic."

AllMusic critic Stephen Thomas Erlewine gave the album three out of five stars, writing that there are a handful of good songs "and if the rest is blandly cookie cutter, at least Iraheta tries hard to give it life and succeeds somewhat."

L.A. Times critic Margaret Wappler gave the album two out of four stars, writing, "To her credit, Iraheta is ever-present, ever-willing on every song," but the album was "too derivative of the Pat Benatar, Pink, Kelly Clarkson trifecta" and "Iraheta doesn't emerge with enough of a singular identity."

== Chart performance ==
Just like You sold approximately 32,000 copies in its first week, debuting at number 35 on the Billboard 200 album chart and number 14 on the Billboard Digital Album Chart.

Chart (2009)	Peak position	Sales/certification
U.S. Billboard 200	35	103,000

== Singles ==
Year	Title	Sales
2009	"Friday I'll Be Over U"	54,000
2010	"Scars"	20,000
2010	"Don't Waste the Pretty" (feat. Orianthi)	4,000

== Track listing ==
No.	Title	Writer(s)	Producer(s)	Length
1.	"Friday I'll Be Over U"	Max Martin, Shellback, Savan Kotecha, Tiffany Amber	Max Martin, Shellback	3:16
2.	"Robot Love"	Heather Bright, Warren "Oak" Felder, Johannes Jørgensen, Sterling Simms, Gary Glitter, Mike Leander	Oak, Uncle Josh, Sterling Simms (additional production)	2:54
3.	"Just like You"	Martin, Shellback, Kotecha	Max Martin, Shellback	3:36
4.	"Don't Waste the Pretty"	Michael Dennis Smith, Stefanie Ridel, Miriam Nervo, Olivia Nervo	Howard Benson	3:33
5.	"Scars"	Toby Gad, Elyssa James	Toby Gad	3:40
6.	"Pieces"	Daniel James, Leah Haywood, Shelly Peiken	Dreamlab	3:44
7.	"D Is for Dangerous"	Sam Watters, Louis Biancaniello, Michael Biancaniello	Sam Watters, Louis Biancaniello	3:33
8.	"Holiday"	Dave Bassett, Dilana Trudy Smith	Dave Bassett	3:44
9.	"Still Breathing"	Tommy Henriksen, Chioma Eze	Howard Benson	3:03
10.	"Trouble Is"	Ron Aniello, Peiken, Aimée Proal	Ron Aniello	4:00
11.	"No One Else"	Kara DioGuardi, Greg Wells, Pink	Greg Wells	4:00
12.	"Beat Me Up"	Kevin Rudolf, Jacob Kasher	Kevin Rudolf	2:44
13.	"You Don’t Know Me"	Allison Iraheta, Mitch Allan, David Bassett, David Hodges	Mitch Allan, David Hodges	2:34

iTunes bonus tracks
No.	Title	Writer(s)	Producer(s)	Length
14.	"Don't Wanna Be Wrong" (pre-order only)	Chris Daughtry, Brian Craddock	Howard Benson	3:22
15.	"El Viernes Te Olvido Yo (Friday I'll Be Over U)" (Deluxe Version only)	Martin, Shellback, Kotecha	Max Martin, Shellback	3:20

Japanese bonus track
No.	Title	Writer(s)	Producer(s)	Length
14.	"One More Reason"	Rudolf, Kasher	Kevin Rudolf	3:41
