= Wild Orchid (group) =

American pop group (1990–2003)

- Also known as: NRG (1990–1992)
- Origin: U.S.
- Genres: R&B, pop, soul
- Years active: 1990–2003
- Labels: Sony, RCA, Yellow Brick
- Past members: Stacy Ferguson; Renee Sands; Stefanie Ridel

Wild Orchid was an American girl group consisting of Stacy Ferguson, Stefanie Ridel, and Renee Sands. Beginning under the name "NRG" in 1990, the group changed their name to Wild Orchid in 1992 and signed with RCA Records in 1994. They released their debut album, Wild Orchid, in 1997, which featured the singles "At Night I Pray", "Supernatural", and "Talk To Me", the latter of which became their highest-charting song on the Billboard Hot 100 at 48. In 1998, they released their second album, Oxygen, which spawned the single "Be Mine", and began hosting the Fox Family Channel game show Great Pretenders (1998–2002).

In 2001, the trio planned to release their intended third studio album, Fire, but its release was cancelled after its first single, "Stuttering (Don't Say)", failed to find much chart success. That year, they were dropped from their record label and Ferguson left the group. Sandstrom and Ridel continued as a duo, independently releasing Wild Orchid's final album, Hypnotic, in 2003. In 2013, Us Weekly named the group number 18 of the 25 'Best Girl Groups of All Time'.

== History ==
=== 1990–1992: Formation ===
Wild Orchid began in 1990 when former Kids Incorporated cast members Renee Sandstrom and Stacy Ferguson and their friend Stefanie Ridel decided to form an all-girl group based on their shared love of music and poetry, and they originally called themselves New Rhythm Generation, or NRG. Heather Holyoak soon joined the group and they began searching for a record contract. As they wrote their songs and recorded their first single, entitled "Get Crazy – Work It," the girls also began coming up with choreographies for their music.

In February 1991, NRG gave their first performance in a Los Angeles nightclub. Heather Holyoak returned to college, and was replaced by Micki Duran. In July 1991, NRG performed to a sold-out crowd at a BMI showcase. Their former manager claimed that he owned the rights to the group's name. By 1992, the group changed their name to Wild Orchid and hired Marta Marrero, mother of fellow Kids Incorporated alumna Martika, as their new manager.

=== 1994–1998: Wild Orchid ===
Wild Orchid joined forces with several record labels including RCA, EMI, and Capitol, eventually signing with Sony Publishing and RCA Records in 1994. Ron Fair became the group’s A&R rep, eventually co-producing their first album. Duran left the group to work on the Nickelodeon TV show Roundhouse, leaving Wild Orchid as a trio. In 1995, Wild Orchid recorded the theme song for the NBC sitcom Hope & Gloria.

In September 1996, the group released "At Night I Pray" as the first single from their debut album. The song peaked at number 63 on the Billboard Hot 100 and on the R&B Singles charts at number 49 in November 1996. A music video directed by Marcus Nispel was in heavy rotation on MTV, BET and VH1. Its release was followed by "Talk to Me" in January 1997, which became their most successful single, peaking at 48 on the Billboard Hot 100. The music video for "Talk to Me" received two Billboard Music Award nominations in the categories of Best clip and Best new artist clip.

In March 1997, Wild Orchid released their self-titled debut album, Wild Orchid. The largely self-written album sold nearly a million units worldwide. In July, the group went on a promotional tour of Malaysia, where the album was certified gold. In August, the group released the third and final single from the album, "Supernatural". Wild Orchid spent most of 1997 promoting their debut album, making appearances on various TV shows such as Oddville, MTV, The RuPaul Show, Vibe, Mad TV, Soul Train, and The Jenny Jones Show, in addition to a guest appearance on the UPN sitcom Goode Behavior. The group were frequent guest hosts on E!'s The Gossip Show. The trio toured as an opening act for 98 Degrees and 'N Sync across the U.S. They also became spokesmodels for Guess.

=== 1998–1999: Oxygen ===
In May 1998, the group promotionally released "I Won't Play the Fool" and "Follow Me". That same month, they performed at "Divas Simply Singing", an annual AIDS benefit concert in Los Angeles hosted by Sheryl Lee Ralph.

In September 1998, they released their second album, Oxygen, which included the first and only single "Be Mine". The album release coincided with the group signing a new wardrobing pact with Guess, continuing their partnership as spokesmodels. To promote the record, they embarked on a brief promotional tour throughout the U.S., performed "Be Mine" on Donny and Marie, and were an opening act during the NSYNC in Concert tour. That year, Wild Orchid were featured on the song "I Will Show You Mine” on the album Home Again by Dutch singer Rene Froger.

In October 1998, Wild Orchid debuted as hosts of the Fox Family Channel's Saturday morning show Great Pretenders, which featured hits lip-synced by young kids, while competing for prizes. The show lasted for four seasons through 2002. That year, the group also filmed a pilot for Sirens, a scripted female-driven action television program, but it was not picked up; the group also continued to host on E!'s The Gossip Show.

In February 1999, the group performed "Declaration" and "Come As You Are" on the ninth season Beverly Hills, 90210 episode "Beheading St. Valentine". In summer 1999, they opened for Cher's Do You Believe? Tour alongside Cyndi Lauper, which toured 52 cities across the U.S. and Canada. In November 1999, the group appeared in the Macy's Annual Thanksgiving Parade where they performed "25 Days Of Christmas".

=== 1999–2003: Fire, Ferguson's departure, and Hypnotic ===
Between 1999 and 2000, the group worked on their intended third studio album, Fire, which included several tracks co-written and produced by JC Chasez of *NSYNC. The album was initially planned for an August 2000 release according to Billboard, but was later pushed back to June 2001. The track "It's All Your Fault", which was slated to be on Fire, was featured in the 2000 film What Women Want, but was not included on the film soundtrack.

In May 2001, the group released the first intended single from Fire, "Stuttering (Don't Say)", which reached #33 on the Billboard Top 40 Singles Sales chart. They also became models for Bongo Jeans. The group co-wrote the song "What's Good 4 the Goose", which appeared on pop group Eden's Crush debut album Popstars (2001). Wild Orchid went on a U.S. promotional tour for Fire between May and July 2001, where they performed mainly in clubs and small venues with other teen-pop acts. On July 29, 2001, they had a concert special on MuchUSA titled Shoutback.

The newer release date for Fire was shifted to June 5, 2001, then eventually June 19; however their record label RCA ultimately declined to release it. On July 19, 2001, the group performed their last concert together at Sea World in San Diego. On July 24, 2001, they filmed their final episode for the fourth season of Great Pretenders, which aired through June 2002. In September 2001, the group was dropped from RCA, and Ferguson left Wild Orchid.

In 2002, Wild Orchid worked on material as a duo of Sandstrom and Ridel. Their album Hypnotic was released independently in January 2003, and reportedly sold 5000 copies online. On September 26, 2006, the greatest hits album Talk To Me: Hits, Rarities & Gems was released by Sony BMG Special Products.

== Solo efforts ==
On May 28, 2001, Minneapolis-based radio station KDWB hosted a concert which featured both Wild Orchid and hip-hop group the Black Eyed Peas. During this event, Stacy Ferguson met will.i.am, spoke to him about producing her solo album, and exchanged phone numbers with him. In 2002, she joined the Black Eyed Peas under the stage name 'Fergie.'

Renee Sandstrom is now primarily a session singer for children's music. In 2004, she provided the singing voice for 'Princess Fiona' in the Shrek 2 special feature Far Far Away Idol. Her vocals have been featured on several Disney albums, including Mousercise (2007), Disney Cuties (2008), the Camp Rock soundtrack (2008), and Playhouse Disney Let's Dance (2010). In 2007, she sang with Ruben Martinez in "Just Like We Dreamed It", which was the theme song for the 15th anniversary of Disneyland Resort Paris. The song was released as a single exclusively in France on March 31, 2007. Sandstrom wrote the music for the song "On Penguin Pond", featured on the Volume One soundtrack for Jim Henson Company's Sid the Science Kid (2009).

Stefanie Ridel co-founded the Talent Bootcamp, in which she teaches young aspiring musical artists. Between 2004 and 2005, Ridel was the lead singer for the techno-dance duo '5th Element' with DJ Rain, and their album was released exclusively online on DJ Rain's website. Ridel's singing voice was heard on the Bratz: The Movie soundtrack (2007), in which she sang the lead on two songs and co-wrote and co-produced many others. Ridel is married to former Wild Orchid producer and Geffen Records president Ron Fair. They have four children together.

== Discography ==
=== Studio albums ===
- Wild Orchid (1997)
- Oxygen (1998)
- Hypnotic (2003)

=== Compilation albums ===
- Talk to Me: Hits, Rarities & Gems (2006)

=== Singles ===
Year	Title	Album	Hot 100	Sales	Top 40	R&B	Canada
1996	"At Night I Pray"	Wild Orchid	63	–	29	67	29
1997	"Talk to Me"	Wild Orchid	48	10	31	85	38
1997	"Supernatural"	Wild Orchid	70	–	–	–	–
1998	"Be Mine"	Oxygen	103	–	–	–	–
2001	"Stuttering (Don't Say)"	Fire	–	–	33	–	–

=== Music videos ===
Year	Title	Album
1996	"At Night I Pray"	Wild Orchid
1996	"At Night I Pray (Director Version)"	Wild Orchid
1996	"Merry Kris-Mix"	-
1997	"Talk to Me"	Wild Orchid
1997	"Talk to Me"	Wild Orchid
1997	"Supernatural"	Wild Orchid
1997	"Supernatural (Remix) (featuring K-Borne)"	Wild Orchid
1998	"Be Mine"	Oxygen

== Awards and nominations ==
Year	Result	Award	Category	Work
1997	Nominated	Billboard Music Award	Best Clip – Dance	"Talk to Me"
1997	Nominated	Billboard Music Award	Best New Artist Clip – Dance	"Talk to Me"
