= Oxygen (Wild Orchid album) =

Studio album by Wild Orchid
- Released: September 29, 1998
- Recorded: 1998
- Genre: Pop; R&B; soul; gospel
- Length: 45:52
- Label: RCA
- Producer: JC Chasez; Christopher Bolden; Todd Chapman; Ron Fair; Full Force; Nate Love; David Paich; Rudy Perez; Bobby Sandstrom; Manuel Seal, Jr.

Wild Orchid chronology
| Wild Orchid (1997) | Oxygen (1998) | Hypnotic (2003) |

Professional ratings
Review scores
| Source | Rating |
|---|---|
| AllMusic | 3/5 stars |

Oxygen is the second album by American girl group Wild Orchid, released in 1998. Since its release, the album has sold over 200,000 copies worldwide.

== Production ==
Thirty songs were written for Oxygen in a couple of months time and the ten best songs were chosen to be recorded. Wild Orchid also recorded cover versions of "Our Lips Are Sealed" and "You're No Good". The reason for the album's title was explained by Ridel in an interview with Hit Records stating that, "On this album we wanted to you know take a deep breath and leave more space, let things have room to breathe. Our sound's a little lighter and that was the concept of Oxygen."

== Release and promotion ==
The album was released in September 1998 and coincided with their stint as Guess spokespersons and models and as hosts of the new Fox Family reality show Great Pretenders, in which kids and teens of all ages lip sync their favorite songs while competing for prizes. They went on a promotional tour throughout the U.S. and were guests on Donny and Marie, where they performed "Be Mine" (the album's lead single). From June 16 to August 28, 1999 the group opened for Cher during her Do You Believe? Tour alongside Cyndi Lauper for 52 dates. The group even made a guest appearance on the Beverly Hills 90210 episode "Beheading St. Valentine" where they performed "Declaration" and "Come As You Are" at the fictitious Peach Pit After Dark.

== Rumored new version ==
Since Oxygen was a commercial failure, rumors were spread in 1999 about the group returning to the studio to record a new version of the album. When a remixed version of "Come As You Are" was leaked onto the internet, fans made assumptions that this version would appear on the new version of Oxygen, but it was never officially released and neither was a new version of Oxygen.

== Track listing ==
1. "Be Mine" (Dave Deviller, Sean Hosein, Wild Orchid) – 3:29
2. "You're No Good (But I Like It)" (Clint Ballard, Jr.) – 3:19
3. "Come as You Are" (Rudy Perez) – 3:31
4. "Declaration" (Manuel Seal, Jr.) – 3:41
5. "Wasted Love" (Sylvia Bennett-Smith, Wild Orchid) – 4:41
6. "Our Lips Are Sealed" (Terry Hall, Jane Wiedlin) – 2:57
7. "Tic Toc" (John Carter, Todd Chapman, Wild Orchid) – 3:23
8. "Holding On" (includes interlude) (Full Force, Wild Orchid) – 4:09
9. "Take You Higher" (Ron Fair, Parental Advisory, Wild Orchid) – 3:29
10. "Make It Easy for Me" (Christopher Bolden, Wild Orchid) – 4:11
11. "You & Me" (Bennett-Smith, Wild Orchid) – 4:15
12. "In My Room" (Bobby Sandstrom, Wild Orchid) – 4:47

== Personnel ==
Wild Orchid

- Stacy Ferguson – vocals
- Stefanie Ridel – vocals
- Renee Sandstrom – vocals

Additional personnel

- Christopher Bolden – drums, keyboard
- Lenny Castro – percussion
- Ron Fair – keyboards
- Steve Forman – percussion
- Full Force – performer
- John Goux – guitar
- Manny Lopez – Spanish guitar
- Nate Love – drums, keyboard
- Eric McKain – percussion
- David McKelvy – harmonica
- Lester Mendez – keyboards
- David Paich – synthesizer, keyboard
- Parental Advisory – organ
- Dean Parks – guitar
- Rudy Perez – keyboards
- Steve Porcaro – synthesizer, keyboard
- Bobby Sandstrom – keyboards
- Deconzo Smith – bass
- Aaron Zigman – keyboards
- Producers: Christopher Bolden, Todd Chapman, Ron Fair, Full Force, Nate Love, David Paich, Rudy Perez, Bobby Sandstrom, Manuel Seal, Jr.
- Executive producer: Ron Fair
- Engineers: Ron Fair, Doug Nemec, Joel Numa, Bruce Swedien, Jay Gordon
- Assistant engineer: Joel Numa, Jay Gordon
- Mixing: Peter Mokran, Gerard Smerek, Tommy Vicari
- Mixing assistants: Jeff Griffin, Tim Lauber, Brian Young
- Mastering: Ted Jensen
- Programming: Christopher Bolden, Sean Hosein, Nate Love, Lester Mendez
- Arrangers: Ron Fair, David Paich, Rudy Perez, Bobby Sandstrom
- Art direction: Henry Marquez
- Photography: Andrew Southam

== Charts ==
Singles - Billboard (North America)

| Year | Single | Chart | Position |
|---|---|---|---|
| 1998 | "Be Mine" | Bubbling Under Hot 100 | 3 |
