= Scars (Allison Iraheta song) =

Single by Allison Iraheta

from the album Just like You
- Released: March 9, 2010 (U.S. radio)
- Recorded: 2009
- Genre: Pop rock
- Length: 3:40
- Label: 19; Jive
- Songwriters: Toby Gad; Elyssa James
- Producer: Toby Gad

Allison Iraheta singles chronology
"Friday I'll Be Over U" (2009)	"Scars" (2010)	"Don't Waste The Pretty" (2010)

"Scars" is the second single from the debut album, Just like You, of American Idol season eight finalist Allison Iraheta. It was written by Toby Gad and Elyssa James. Gad also produced the track.

== Critical reception ==
Reception of "Scars" has been generally positive.

Entertainment Weekly's Michael Slezak wrote "Meanwhile, ballads like the understated Scars and the bluesy Trouble Is separate Iraheta from questionably abled Miley/Selena contemporaries. Girl. Can. Sang!".

Kelsey Paine from Billboard.com agreed writing "soulful tunes like "Scars" and the bluesy "Trouble Is" showcase the raw talent that made Iraheta a star on "Idol" and set her apart from other young pop upstarts."

AOL Radio writer Sara D Anderson praises Scars, noting "'Scars' is one of the many songs (others 'Robot Love,' 'Trouble Is' and 'Friday I'll Be Over U') critically appraised off her debut album that showcases her husky yet powerful vocals and spunky attitude."

== Promotion ==
Iraheta performed the song on February 25, 2010, on the Top 24 elimination episode of the ninth season of American Idol. She also performed an acoustic version of the song on JoJo Wright's radio show JoJo on the Radio on KIIS-FM. Due to Iraheta's popularity in Asia, Iraheta also headlined concerts in Manila and Bali, performing 'Scars' at both.

== Sales ==
Year	Title	Sales
2009	"Scars"	20,000

== Release history ==
Release dates and formats for "Scars"
Region	Date	Format	Label(s)	Ref.
United States	March 9, 2010	Mainstream airplay	Jive	

== Media appearance ==
The song was featured on the TV special Monster High: New Ghoul @ School.
