= Making Patterns Rhyme =

Studio album by various artists
- Released: 24 October 2014
- Label: Manimal Vinyl; RNDM

Making Patterns Rhyme is a tribute album devoted to Duran Duran, as well as a charity record to benefit Amnesty International. Among the artists who appear on the album are Moby, Warpaint, Soko, Austra, Luxxury, Carina Round, and Little Dragon.

Making Patterns Rhyme was released on 24 October 2014 by Manimal Vinyl. The title derives from the lyrics of "Planet Earth", a song on Duran Duran's 1981 debut album.

== Track listing ==
=== Disc 1 ===
1. Lewis & Clarke – "The Seventh Stranger" (4:49)
2. Moby – "Rio" (5:31)
3. Service Bells – "Anyone Out There" (4:12)
4. Beliefs – "Sound of Thunder" (4:54)
5. Warpaint – "The Chauffeur" (5:46)
6. Luxxury – "Planet Earth" (4:02)
7. Austra – "American Science" (5:40)
8. Verdigrls – "Secret October" (3:08)
9. The Dead Lovers – "The Wild Boys" (4:17)
10. Soko – "Girls on Film" (4:11)
11. Carina Round & Aidan Hawken – "Come Undone" (5:14)

=== Disc 2 ===
1. Barbarian – "Late Bar" (4:24)
2. The Holiday Crowd – "Friends of Mine" (5:09)
3. Mercies – "Lonely in Your Nightmare" (4:23)
4. Louise Burns – "Land" (4:11)
5. Girlfriends and Boyfriends – "Careless Memories" (4:08)
6. Darklands – "Union of the Snake" (4:27)
7. Halo Circus – "Do You Believe in Shame?" (4:26)
8. Jack Lawtey – "Save a Prayer" (4:01)
9. Trends – "My Own Way" (3:23)
10. Vum – "Winter Marches On" (3:29)
11. Moby – "Rio" (5:30)
