= Goode Behavior =

American sitcom

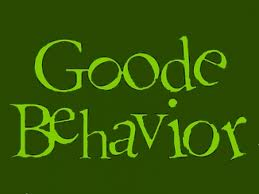
- Genre: Sitcom
- Created by: Robert Illes; Brian Pollack; Dennis Pollack; Mert Rich
- Directed by: Leonard R. Garner Jr. Jack Shea; Gary Shimokawa; Thomas J. Thompson; Michael Zinberg
- Starring: Sherman Hemsley; Alex Datcher; Bianca Lawson; Scott Grimes; Joseph Maher; Dorien Wilson
- Composer: Steve Dorff
- Country of origin: United States
- Original language: English
- No. of seasons: 1
- No. of episodes: 22

Production
- Executive producers: Brian Pollack; Mert Rich
- Producers: Andy Guerdat; Ken Johnston; Al Lowenstein; Dennis Pollack
- Camera setup: Multi-camera
- Running time: 30 minutes
- Production companies: Seven Mile Road Productions; Paramount Television

Original release
- Network: UPN
- Release: August 26, 1996 – May 19, 1997

Goode Behavior is an American sitcom that premiered August 26, 1996, on UPN. The series was cancelled after one season, airing its last original episode on May 19, 1997, for a total of 22 episodes. The series marked Hemsley's return to a series for the second and final time since Amen ended in 1991.

== Synopsis ==
Willie Goode (Sherman Hemsley) is a newly paroled convicted con artist. He is also the father of Franklin Goode (Dorien Wilson), his estranged son. Franklin is a college professor and is in the process of being promoted to Dean of Humanities at Chapel Hill University in Chapel Hill, North Carolina. The two must peacefully co-exist when Willie arrives at Franklin's house unannounced to fulfill the conditions of his probation; he must live at his son's house, under house arrest. Caught in the middle of the family feuding are Franklin's wife Barbara (Alex Datcher), a local news anchor, and their teenage daughter Bianca (Bianca Lawson).

== Cast ==
=== Main ===
- Sherman Hemsley as Willie Goode
- Alex Datcher as Barbara Goode
- Bianca Lawson as Bianca Goode
- Scott Grimes as Garth
- Joseph Maher as Chancellor Willoughby
- Dorien Wilson as Franklin Goode

=== Recurring ===
- Justina Machado as Raquel De La Rosa
- Marc McClure as Harry Danielson
- Gabrielle Union as Tracy Monaghan

== Episodes ==
No.	Title	Directed by	Written by	Original release date	Prod. code	Viewers (millions)
1	"Freed Willie"	Jack Shea	Mert Rich & Brian Pollack & Robert Illes and Dennis Pollack	September 9, 1996	001	5.3
2	"Goode Together"	Unknown	Unknown	September 16, 1996	002	3.5
When Franklin finally realizes his dream of being included in Chancellor Willoughby's weekly card game, Willie seizes the opportunity to do the kind of father/son bonding he regrets not doing when Franklin was a child - he teaches his son to play poker.
3	"Goode Samaritan"	Unknown	Unknown	September 23, 1996	003	3.1
When Willie takes a job at the TV station where Barbara, his daughter-in-law, is an anchor, it's not long before his expertise as a con man puts him in front of the camera as the stations new consumer advocate. Franklin is thrilled that his father has found a way to use his "talents" for good, until the bribes start arriving. To keep the popular new consumer advocate off their backs, businesses will do just about anything - including installing a swimming pool in the Goode's backyard. But Willie's days as an on-air personality may be numbered.
4	"Goode Sport"	Unknown	Unknown	September 30, 1996	004	3.8
5	"Goode Cause"	Unknown	Unknown	October 7, 1996	005	3.6
6	"Goode Feelings"	Michael Zinberg	Andy Guerdat	October 14, 1996	006	3.8
When Franklin convinces Willie to attend therapy sessions to help cure his need for running schemes, Willie devises a plan to run a pyramid scheme out of the therapy sessions and everybody joins in. When Franklin finds out about the plan, he is infuriated and tries to break up the sessions, but with surprising results.
7	"Goode Hands"	Unknown	Unknown	October 21, 1996	007	4.0
8	"Goode and Scared"	Unknown	Unknown	October 28, 1996	010	5.0
9	"Goode and Fired"	Unknown	Unknown	November 4, 1996	008	4.5
10	"Goode Book"	Unknown	Unknown	November 11, 1996	009	3.6
11	"Goode Golly, Miss Molly"	Unknown	Unknown	November 18, 1996	011	3.5
12	"Goode Grades"	Jack Shea	Andy Guerdat	November 25, 1996	012	3.2
As a dodge to keep from getting sent back to prison, and to keep from having to get a job, Willie enrolls into school in his son's Anthropology class. Meanwhile, Bianca hatches a scheme to sell term papers.
13	"Goode Lord"	Unknown	Unknown	January 13, 1997	013	3.39
14	"Goode Stuff"	Unknown	Unknown	January 20, 1997	014	3.88
15	"Goode Will"	Unknown	Unknown	February 3, 1997	016	3.66
16	"Goode Lovin'"	Gary Shimokawa	Mark Drop	February 10, 1997	018	3.98
Just before Valentine's Day, Willie develops a crush on a colleague of Franklin's, Dr. Pamela Fordham (Janet Hubert-Whitten). Bianca and Rolanda (Countess Vaughn) try to offer advice, but to no avail. When Franklin fixes the woman up with another academic, a lovesick Willie decides to pick up his spirits at Mr. Bobo's Girlie Hut. While there, he asks one of the strippers to be his date at Franklin and Barbara's Valentine's Day party, but the stripper mistakes Willie's invitation for a job offer.
17	"The Goode, Bad and the Willie"	Michael Zinberg	Andy Guerdat	February 17, 1997	017	3.59
Willie's helpers at his restaurant all decide to leave, so Willie finally decides to hire someone. He hires the wise talking Raquel, just as he mistakes a food critic for a bum & throws him out. An old prison buddy, Jimmy the Brain, talks Willie into a scheme to sell hair growth tonic.
18	"Goode Daddy"	Unknown	Unknown	February 24, 1997	015	4.13
19	"Goode Music"	Jack Shea	Mert Rich & Brian Pollack	April 28, 1997	021	3.46
Wild Orchid guest as a trio that Willie "discovers" when he decides to audition acts to perk up business at Willie's Chili. Tone Loc is the record executive Willie hopes will sign the act and propel them all to fame and fortune.
20	"Goode Cop, Bad Cop"	Unknown	Unknown	May 5, 1997	020	3.23
21	"The Only Goode Indian"	Michael Zinberg	Barry Gurstein & David Pitlik	May 12, 1997	019	2.98
Willie devises a plan to bring in extra revenue into his new restaurant by claiming to be an Indian descendant, and using reservation status, bring in casino equipment with slots & gambling. Barbara gets bitten by the gambling bug.
22	"Goode Angel"	Leonard R. Garner Jr.	Robert Illes & Dennis Pollack	May 19, 1997	022	3.25
The bank threatens to foreclose on Willie's Chilli restaurant, so Willie cooks up a scheme to come up with some money so the bank won't foreclose.
