= Liquid Blue =

American indie pop rock band

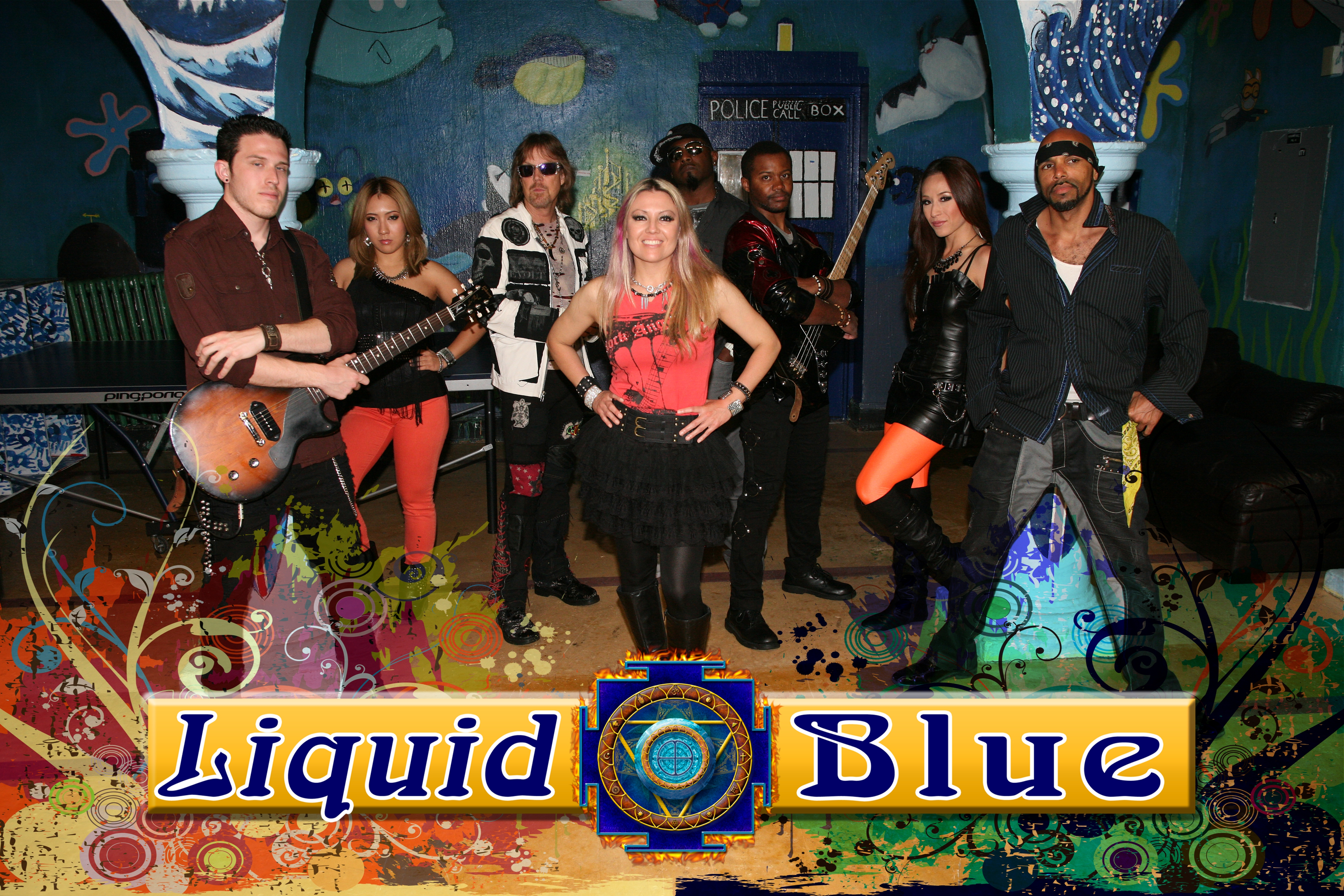
- Liquid Blue Band

Background information
- Origin: San Diego, California, U.S.
- Genres: Pop, rock, electronic dance music
- Years active: 1996-present
- Labels: Deep Blue Records, PCT Music (United States), Shanghai Audio (Asia)
- Members: Core Members Scott Stephens; Michael Vangerov; Nikki Green Additional Members Rashad Green; Jenny Nowinski; Aidan Spencer; Glenn Frazier; Diana Ferrer; Kevin Cooper; Andre Howie; Jazmine Rogers; JC Boissey; Arnie Vilches
- Past members: BC Jean; Miz Mandy; Jordan Medina; Wrekless Watson; Jessica Manning
- Website: www.liquid-blue.com

Liquid Blue is an American indie pop rock band/cover band formed in San Diego, California, in 1996 by Scott Stephens and Michael Vangerov. The group has performed in more than 500 cities in 100 countries on six continents and have been recognized as "the world's most traveled band". They are more popular in parts of Asia and Europe than in their home country. In 2010 the group scored their first hit in the United States with the song "Earth Passport", which reached No. 3 on the Billboard Hot Dance Chart in October 2010. Earth Passport was recorded using nine languages including all six of the official languages of the United Nations. Liquid Blue received a Guinness World Record for "Earth Passport" for "Song Sung in the Most Languages". In 2011 the group was named "Entertainer of the Year - Ensemble" at the Event Solutions Spotlight Awards held in Las Vegas on February 28. The band was "certified green" by the County of San Diego in May 2009. The band's official slogan is "Music To Move You." The core unit of Stephens, Vangerov, and Nikki Green have been together since 1998.

== Musical style ==
At the time of their initial LP release, the group's use of Eastern Indian instruments (tabla, sitar, kanun) and scales were unique in pop music with Liquid Blue being one of the first groups to record an entire album blending East Indian music with western pop/rock. Indian influenced songs have appeared on pop albums before, most notably on The Beatles' Sgt. Pepper's Lonely Hearts Club Band. Liquid Blue's somewhat limited number of original compositions all contain "socially conscious" lyrics by primary songwriter Scott Stephens, a former professional Roller Derby skater with the Los Angeles Thunderbirds. Tracks from their highly acclaimed debut album, Supernova, have been included on 20 separate compilation CDs. The album was produced by David DeVore and mixed by Joe Chiccarelli and was awarded Pop Album of the Year at the Los Angeles Music Awards. The album Earth Passport was released in 2010 and yielded a No. 3 Billboard dance hit.

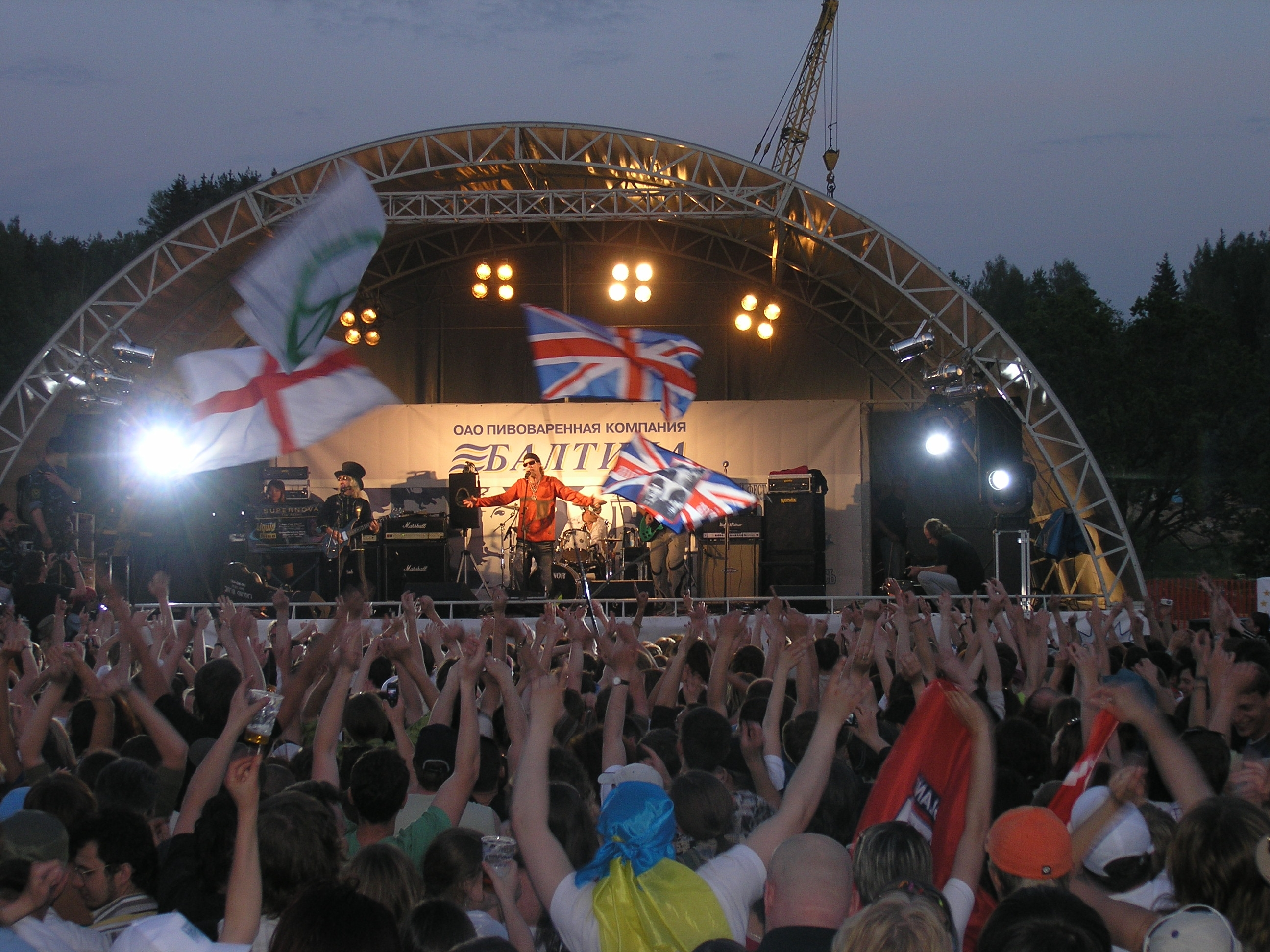
Liquid Blue in Belarus, 2008

== History ==
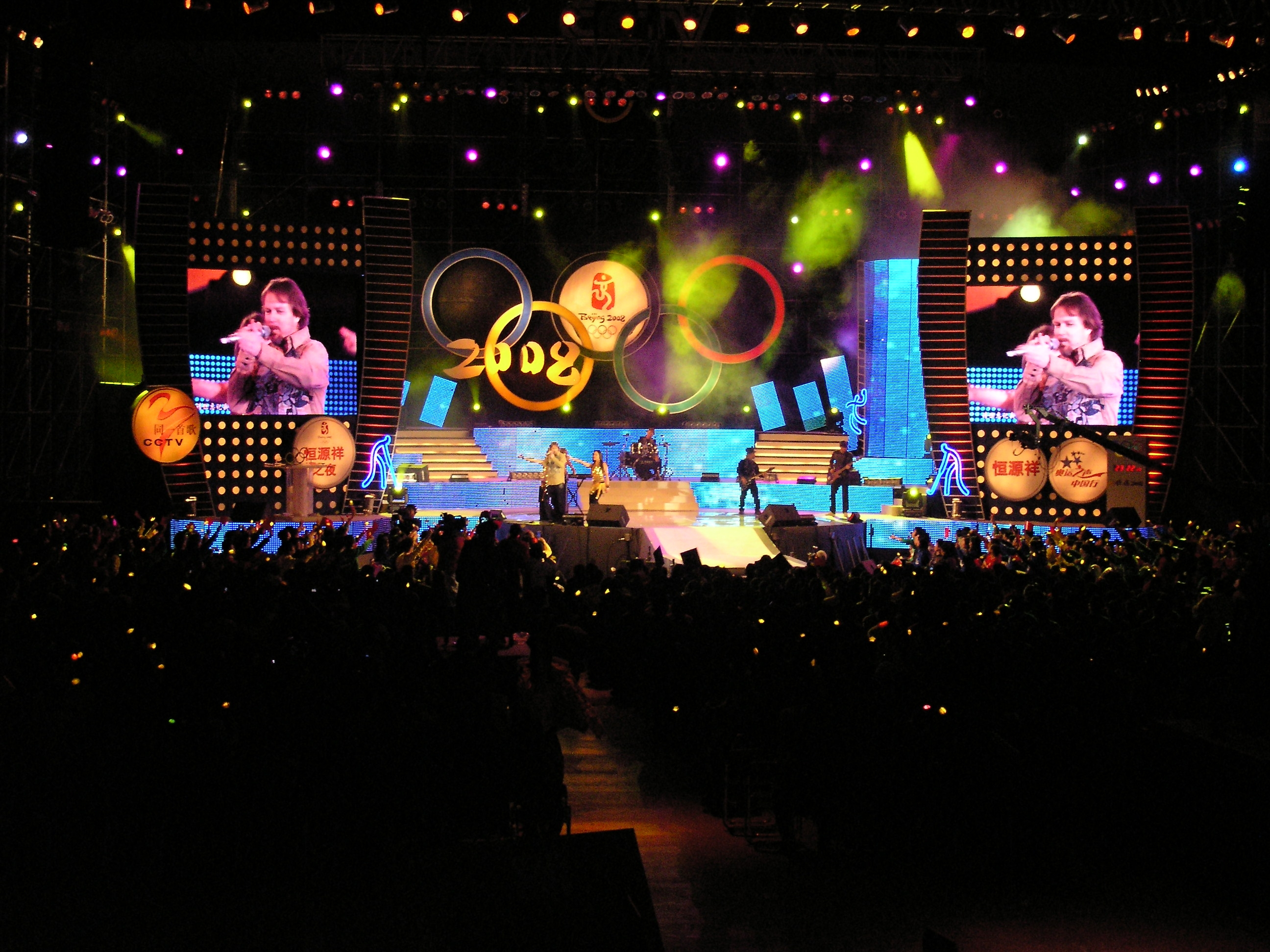
Liquid Blue in Beijing, China, 2007

Liquid Blue started as a cover band in 1996. In 2002 they were awarded Best Tribute Band at the San Diego Music Awards after several previous nominations. In 2003, they began writing their own material while relying on covers for most of their live shows.

The band has their greatest popularity in China, and in 2002 they played their largest show in Dalian, China for an audience of 65,000 people. In 2005, they became the first American band signed to a major Chinese record label. They played the official Beijing Olympics Kick-Off Concert in 2008. The band has done 17 tours of China where they sing songs in both Mandarin and English.

The band continues to perform in the United States as well. The group has a flexible lineup of seven people, with an "A Team," a "B Team" called Aqua Blue, and a smaller version of the group called Acoustic Blue.

In April 2013 when Sammy Hagar came to San Diego he hired Liquid Blue to be his backing band and "cover" songs from his entire career, at a fundraising event. Currently most Liquid Blue performances are private corporate events, fundraisers and social events.

As of 2014 Liquid Blue had performed in more than 500 cities in over 100 countries. The band has also performed in all 50 U.S. states and every "major league" city (any municipality with at least one major professional sports team) in the USA.

== The Hippie House ==
The band is also known for their colorful center of operations in the Ocean Beach area of San Diego CA, known locally as " the hippie house." The core band members live and/or work at the beachfront home which attracts visitors daily with a California native "peace garden"; a peace pole and a musically themed mural on the surrounding retaining wall. The house and studio is a certified "Green Business" by the County of San Diego.

== Awards ==
Year	Award	Presenter
2004	America's Best Independent Artist	PCT Music
2005	America's Best Independent Artist	PCT Music
2005	Hot AC Group of the Year (nominated)	New Music Weekly
2006	Best Band (Runner-Up)	International Music Awards
2007	Best Band (Runner-Up)	International Music Awards
2009	Best Pop Album (Winner)	Los Angeles Music Awards
2011	Entertainer of the Year - Ensemble (Winner)	Spotlight Awards
2012	Entertainment Act of the Year (Winner)	Biz Bash Readers Choice

== Trivia ==
BC Jean, a former member of the band, was signed to J Records (Sony Music Entertainment), by Clive Davis in 2009. She co-wrote the worldwide No. 1 hit "If I Were A Boy" for Beyoncé.

== Discography ==
Studio Albums

Year	Name	Label
2004	Supernova	Deep Blue Records
2010	Earth Passport	CD Baby
2015	Peace Anthems	Deep Blue Records
2015	Protest Anthems	Deep Blue Records
2015	Cosmic Covers	Deep Blue Records
2015	Rock Tribute	Deep Blue Records
2015	R&B Tribute	Deep Blue Records
2015	Blue Brass	Deep Blue Records
2015	Blue Ballads	Deep Blue Records
2015	Acoustic Blue	Deep Blue Records
2015	Trippin' 1960's Tribute	Deep Blue Records
2015	Dazed 1970's Tribute	Deep Blue Records
2015	Juiced 1980's Tribute	Deep Blue Records
2015	Blazed 1990's Tribute	Deep Blue Records
2015	Faded 2000's Tribute	Deep Blue Records
2015	Baked 2010's Tribute	Deep Blue Records

Charting Singles

Year	Name	Label	Details
2005	"Real"	Deep Blue Records	#1 Spins Tracking System (STS) Hot AC Top 30 Indie Label List
2010	"Earth Passport"	Deep Blue Records	#3 Billboard Dance Chart #12 Billboard Hot Singles

Compilations

Year	Name	Label
2017	Top Tracks	Deep Blue Records

Imports

Year	Name	Label
2005	Supernova (Chinese Import)	Shanghai Audio & Video
