= Talk to Me (NYC) =

Talk To Me is a cultural phenomenon first observed in New York City. In 2002, Bill Wetzel and Liz Barry started hanging out in lawn chairs on New York City street corners with a sign that said "Talk To Me". What surprised many was that the couple appeared genuinely interested in the subjects that were addressed and that there was no ulterior motive to their project.

Wetzel came up with the idea for this project in February 2002 out of the desire to have conversations with strangers. The duo spent more than three years in various New York City neighborhoods with their sign. They worked small jobs, and lived in part on an anonymous donation who provided them with one year's worth of their daily stipend, $7 each. They also hosted a Talk To Me Party in Bryant Park where they invited strangers that they met to talk to each other.

In 2005, Barry and Wetzel spent thirteen months biking from New York City to San Francisco and back, pausing en route with their sign and leaving from New York with only $2,000. When traveling around the country, they talked to strangers at malls, parks, gas stations, and bars, and were also invited to talk to strangers at weddings, prisons, and senior centers.

== See also ==
- Listening
- Dialogue
