= Renee Sands =

American singer and former child actress

- Born: Renee Ilene Sandstrom; Worcester, Massachusetts, U.S.
- Genres: Pop
- Occupations: Singer-songwriter, actress
- Instrument: Vocals
- Years active: 1983–present
- Labels: K-Tel, Sony, RCA, Yellow Brick, Walt Disney
- Formerly of: Wild Orchid
- Spouse: Robby Welles (m. 2008)

Renee Ilene Sandstrom, known professionally as Renee Sands, is an American singer and actress. She is known for playing Renee on Kids Incorporated and providing vocals for the American girl group Wild Orchid.

== Early life ==
Sands was born in Worcester, Massachusetts. Renee is the youngest of four children. She grew up singing and had a band with her family.

== Career ==
In 1983, Sands starred in the pilot of the hit 1980s musical children's show Kids Incorporated. It was never released on television, but was released on VHS in 1985. She starred on the show's first four seasons from 1984 to 1987, where she eventually became the oldest female character. She started on the show at the age of 10 and ended at 13.

As a child, she also finished second to Scott Grimes on a Boston talent show called, Community Auditions. Sands also opened for acts that include Wayne Newton, Bob Hope, and Debbie Reynolds. She sang in the children's chorus with other Kids Incorporated cast members on Martika's hit "Toy Soldiers".

From 1990 to 2003, alongside her former Kids Incorporated costar (TV sister), Stacy Ferguson, and her high school friend, Stefanie Ridel, Sands was a member of the 1990s band Wild Orchid. She was a member through the band's entirety.

Wild Orchid was an American girl group consisting of Stacy Ferguson, Stefanie Ridel, and Renee Sandstrom. Beginning under the name "NRG" in 1990, the group changed their name to Wild Orchid in 1992 and signed with RCA Records in 1994. The group released two albums, earning Billboard Music Awards nominations with their debut. In 2001, Ferguson left the group. Sandstrom and Ridel continued as a duo, releasing Wild Orchid's final album Hypnotic in 2003. In 2013, Us Weekly named the group number 18 of the 25 'Best Girl Groups of All Time'.

Sands sang "Just Like We Dreamed It" with Ruben Martinez as the 15th anniversary theme for Disneyland Paris. She had a role in the Disney Channel Original Movie Camp Rock, providing the singing voice for Jasmine Richards' character Margaret "Peggy" Dupree, singing the song "Here I Am". She sang "Love from Afar" on the soundtrack for Just Friends. In 2003, she and her Wild Orchid partner Stephanie Ridel starred in the movie, Pink Ladies.

In 2012, she sang "I Think I Like You" with the band Eagle Eye. The song was featured in season two of Dance Moms. In 2021, Sands sang the theme song for the new Disney Junior show The Chicken Squad.

== Personal life ==
On October 10, 2008, Renee was married in a private ceremony in Los Angeles, California to retirement investment expert Robby Welles. The couple has a daughter.
