= Fergie discography =

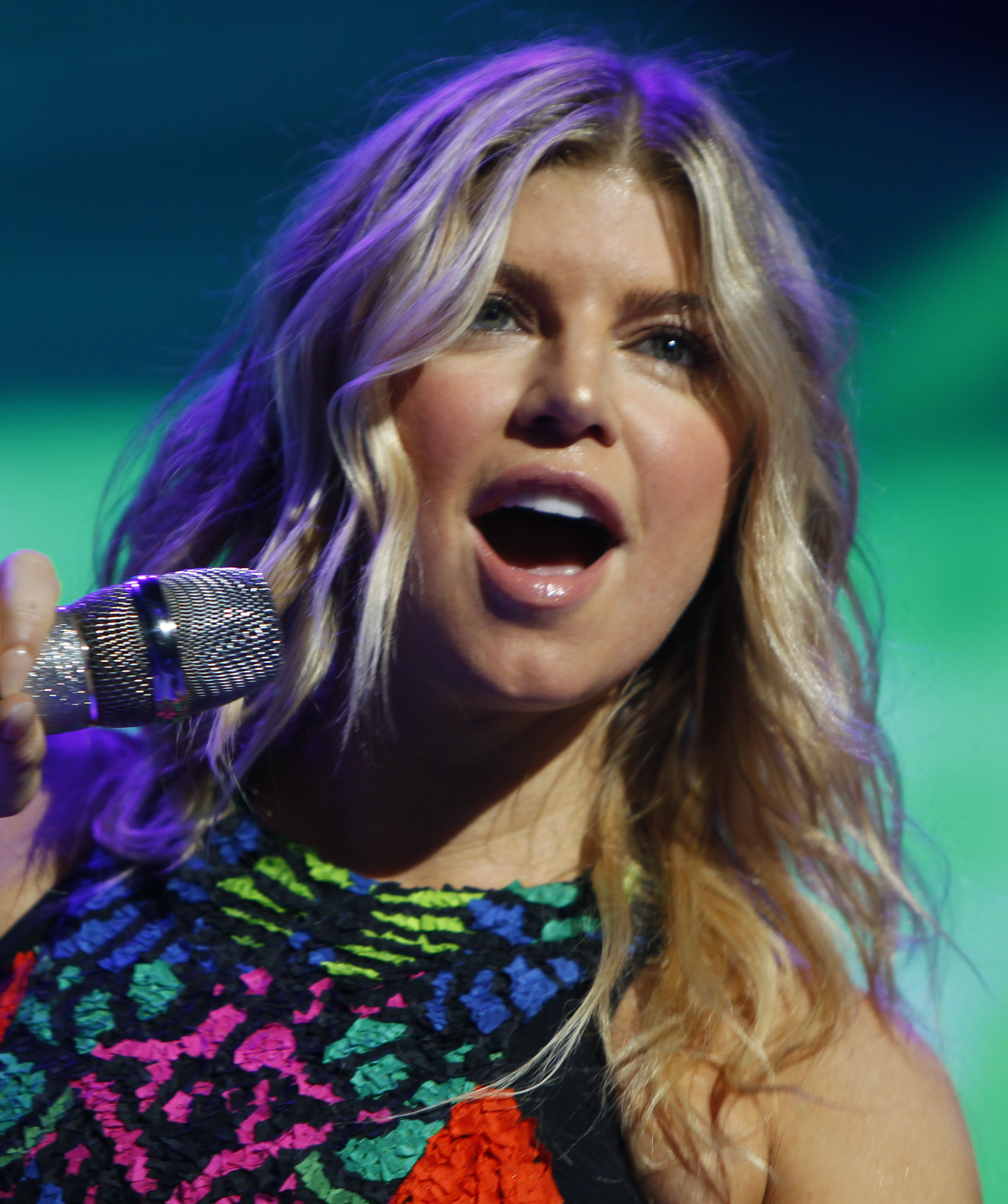
- Fergie performing in 2011
- Studio albums: 2
- Singles: 13
- Music videos: 21

American singer and songwriter Fergie has released two studio albums, 13 singles (including six as a featured artist), and 20 music videos. According to Recording Industry Association of America, Fergie has sold 27.5 million albums & singles in the United States. Fergie was ranked 16th on Billboard's 2000s Top Female Artist of the Decade, and 28th on their Top Women Artists of the 21st Century list.

In 2005, after releasing two studio albums with group the Black Eyed Peas, Fergie announced that she had begun working on a solo project, set for a release in late 2006. Fergie's debut album, The Dutchess, was released in September 2006 and debuted at number three on the Billboard 200 chart. Almost a year later, the album rose to number two. The album spawned five singles that peaked in the top five in the United States, making The Dutchess the first debut album to do so since Milli Vanilli's 1989 debut Girl You Know It's True. The singles "London Bridge", "Glamorous" with Ludacris and "Big Girls Don't Cry" reached number one on the Billboard Hot 100 chart ("London Bridge" reaching the spot in three weeks, the second fastest ascent in Hot 100 history). This made Fergie the first female artist with three number ones from one album since Christina Aguilera in 2000. The second single, "Fergalicious" with will.i.am, and the fifth single, "Clumsy", peaked at number two and number five, respectively. The singles sold over two million downloads each in the US, making The Dutchess the only album in its original release to spawn five singles to do so. The album became the third best-selling album of 2007 in the US, and the twentieth best-selling globally. The album has sold 3.9 million copies in the US, and 6 million worldwide.

Her second studio album Double Dutchess, was released on September 22, 2017. Its lead single, "L.A. Love (La La)" was released in September 2014, and was a commercial success overseas in the UK, peaking at number three on the UK Singles Chart. In the United States, meanwhile, the single peaked at number 27 on the Hot 100 and number five on the Hot Rap Songs. Fergie re-launched promotion of her second studio album Double Dutchess in 2016, with the release of two teaser videos, "Hungry" and the second single "M.I.L.F. $" in July 2016, which became an instant viral sensation, gaining over 244 million views. "M.I.L.F. $" peaked at No. 34 on the Hot 100 and No. 56 on the UK Singles Chart. The third single "Life Goes On" was released on November 11, 2016.

== Studio albums ==
List of studio albums, with selected chart positions, sales figures and certifications
Title	Album details	Peak chart positions										Sales	Certifications
Title	Album details	US	AUS	FRA	CAN	GER	IRE	NZ	SWE	SWI	UK	Sales	Certifications
The Dutchess	Released: September 19, 2006; Label: A&M, will.i.am; Formats: CD, LP, digital download	2	1	44	4	11	9	2	35	11	18	US: 3,900,000	RIAA: 5× Platinum; ARIA: 4× Platinum; BPI: Platinum; BVMI: Gold; IFPI SWI: Gold; MC: 3× Platinum; RMNZ: 4× Platinum
Double Dutchess	Released: September 22, 2017; Label: Dutchess Music, BMG; Formats: CD, LP, digital download	19	39	175	23	65	—	— (Note: Double Dutchess did not enter the NZ Top 40 Albums Chart, but peaked at number one on the NZ Heatseekers Albums Chart.)	—	69	49	US: 239,000	
"—" denotes releases that did not chart or were not released in that territory.

== Extended plays ==
List of extended plays, with selected chart positions
Title	EP details	Peak chart position
Title	EP details	US
5-Live Tracks (Wal-Mart Exclusive)	Released: November 20, 2007; Label: will.i.am, A&M; Format: Digital download	—
As Cinco Melhores	Released: December 2007; Label: will.i.am, A&M; Format: Digital download	—
The Dutchess Deluxe EP	Released: May 27, 2008; Label: will.i.am, A&M; Format: Digital download	46
Fergie Hit Pac – 5 Series	Released: August 2009; Label: will.i.am, A&M; Format: Digital download	—

== Singles ==
=== As lead artist ===
List of singles as lead artist, with selected chart positions and certifications, showing year released and album name
Title	Year	Peak chart positions										Certifications	Album
Title	Year	US	AUS	CAN	FRA	GER	IRE	NZ	SWE	SWI	UK	Certifications	Album
"London Bridge"	2006	1	3	— (Note: "London Bridge" did not enter the Canadian Hot 100 but did peak at number 2 on the Hot Canadian Digital Song Sales chart.)	27	3	8	1	13	6	3	RIAA: 2× Platinum; ARIA: Platinum; BPI: Silver; RMNZ: Platinum	The Dutchess
"Fergalicious" (featuring will.i.am)	2006	2	4	24	15	23	—	5	22	29	105	RIAA: 4× Platinum; ARIA: 2× Platinum; BPI: Gold; BVMI: Gold; RMNZ: 2× Platinum	The Dutchess
"Glamorous" (featuring Ludacris)	2007	1	2	12	32	16	3	9	—	38	6	RIAA: 3× Platinum; ARIA: 3× Platinum; BPI: Platinum; BVMI: Gold; RMNZ: 3× Platinum	The Dutchess
"Big Girls Don't Cry"	2007	1	1	1	11	6	1	1	4	3	2	RIAA: 4× Platinum; ARIA: 5× Platinum; BPI: 2× Platinum; BVMI: Gold; GLF: Gold; RMNZ: 4× Platinum	The Dutchess
"Clumsy"	2007	5	3	4	—	50	17	4	15	43	62	RIAA: 2× Platinum; ARIA: 2× Platinum; RMNZ: Platinum	The Dutchess
"Finally" (featuring John Legend)	2008	— (Note: "Finally" did not enter the Billboard Hot 100, but peaked at number one on the Bubbling Under Hot 100 Singles chart.)	—	61	—	—	—	—	—	—	—		The Dutchess
"A Little Party Never Killed Nobody (All We Got)" (with Q-Tip and GoonRock)	2013	77	43	72	27	10	89	3	14	59	90	RIAA: Platinum; ARIA: Gold; BPI: Silver; BVMI: Platinum; GLF: Platinum; RMNZ: 2× Platinum	The Great Gatsby
"L.A. Love (La La)"	2014	27	53	28	72	55	30	—	86	—	3	RIAA: Platinum; BPI: Gold; RMNZ: Gold	Double Dutchess
"M.I.L.F. $"	2016	34	26	28	89	89	78	— (Note: "M.I.L.F. $" did not enter the NZ Top 40 Singles Chart, but peaked at number 1 on the NZ Heatseekers Singles Chart.)	—	—	56	RIAA: Gold	Double Dutchess
"Life Goes On"	2016	—	—	—	—	—	—	—	—	—	—		Double Dutchess
"You Already Know" (featuring Nicki Minaj)	2017	— (Note: "You Already Know" did not enter the US Billboard Hot 100 but did peak at number 27 on the Digital Song Sales chart.)	95	— (Note: "You Already Know" did not enter the Canadian Hot 100 but did peak at number 19 on the Hot Canadian Digital Song Sales chart.)	—	—	—	—	—	—	96		Double Dutchess
"Save It Til Morning"	2017	—	—	—	—	—	—	—	—	—	—		Double Dutchess
"A Little Work"	2017	—	—	—	—	—	—	—	—	—	—		Double Dutchess
"—" denotes releases that did not chart or were not released in that territory.

=== As featured artist ===
List of singles as featured artist, with selected chart positions and certifications, showing year released and album name
Title	Year	Peak chart positions										Certifications	Album
Title	Year	US	AUS	CAN	FRA	GER	IRE	NZ	SWE	SWI	UK	Certifications	Album
"Impacto" (Remix) (Daddy Yankee featuring Fergie)	2007	56	—	—	—	—	—	—	—	—	—		El Cartel: The Big Boss
"Party People" (Nelly featuring Fergie)	2008	40	14	52	—	23	12	7	—	—	14		Brass Knuckles
"That Ain't Cool" (Kumi Koda featuring Fergie)	2008	—	—	—	—	—	—	—	—	—	—		Trick
"Gettin' Over You" (David Guetta and Chris Willis featuring Fergie and LMFAO)	2010	31	5	12	1	15	4	3	28	11	1	ARIA: 2× Platinum; BPI: Platinum; BVMI: Gold; GLF: Platinum	One More Love
"Beautiful Dangerous" (Slash featuring Fergie)	2010	— (Note: "Beautiful Dangerous" did not enter the Billboard Hot 100, but peaked at number eight on the Bubbling Under Hot 100 Singles chart.)	—	58	—	90	—	—	—	—	—		Slash
"—" denotes releases that did not chart or were not released in that territory.

=== Charity singles ===
Title	Year	Peak chart positions							Album
Title	Year	US	AUS	CAN	IRE	NZ	SWE	UK	Album
"Sing" (Annie Lennox featuring various artists (Note: The featured list includes Anastacia, Isobel Campbell, Dido, Céline Dion, Melissa Etheridge, Fergie, Beth Gibbons, Faith Hill, Angélique Kidjo, Beverley Knight, Gladys Knight, k.d. lang, Sarah McLachlan, Beth Orton, Pink, Bonnie Raitt, Shakira, Shingai Shoniwa, Joss Stone, Sugababes, KT Tunstall and Martha Wainwright.))	2007	—	—	—	—	—	—	—	Songs of Mass Destruction
"Just Stand Up!" (among Artists Stand Up to Cancer)	2008	11	39	10	—	19	51	26	Non-album singles
"We Are the World 25 for Haiti" (among Artists for Haiti)	2010	2	18	7	9	8	5	50	Non-album singles
"L.O.V.E. (Let One Voice Emerge)" (featuring various artists (Note: The featured list includes Patti Austin, Sheila E., Siedah Garrett, Lalah Hathaway, Judith Hill and Keke Palmer.))	2012	—	—	—	—	—	—	—	Non-album singles
"Love Song to the Earth" (among Artists for the Earth (Note: The supergroup was formed by Paul McCartney, Jon Bon Jovi, Sheryl Crow, Fergie, Colbie Caillat, Natasha Bedingfield, Leona Lewis, Sean Paul, Johnny Rzeznik, Krewella, Angélique Kidjo, Kelsea Ballerini, Christina Grimmie, Nicole Scherzinger, Victoria Justice and Q'orianka Kilcher.))	2015	—	—	—	—	—	—	—	Non-album singles
"—" denotes releases that did not chart or were not released in that territory.

== Promotional singles ==
List of promotional singles, with selected chart positions and certifications, showing year released and album name
Title	Year	Peak chart positions				Album
Title	Year	US	AUS	CAN	NZ	Album
"Pick It Up"	2007	—	—	—	—	The Dutchess
"Labels or Love"	2008	—	15	28	—	Sex and the City
"Here I Come"	2008	— (Note: "Here I Come" did not enter the Billboard Hot 100, but peaked at number twenty-two on the Bubbling Under Hot 100 Singles chart.)	22	—	39	The Dutchess
"Feel Alive" (featuring Pitbull and DJ Poet)	2012	—	—	—	—	Step Up Revolution
"Netflix" (2 Chainz featuring Fergie)	2013	—	—	—	—	B.O.A.T.S. II: Me Time
"Hungry" (featuring Rick Ross)	2017	—	—	—	—	Double Dutchess
"—" denotes releases that did not chart or were not released in that territory.

== Other charted songs ==
Title	Year	Peak chart positions			Album
Title	Year	CAN	SWE	SWI	Album
"Barracuda"	2008	— (Note: "Barracuda" did not enter the Canadian Hot 100, but did peak at number 74 on the Hot Canadian Digital Song Sales chart.)	—	—	The Dutchess (Deluxe)
"Beat It 2008" (Michael Jackson featuring Fergie)	2008	77	8	26	Thriller 25
"Paradise City" (Slash featuring Fergie and Cypress Hill)	2010	75	—	—	Slash
"—" denotes releases that did not chart or were not released in that territory.

== Guest appearances ==
List of non-single guest appearances, with other performing artists, showing year released and album name
Title	Year	Other artist(s)	Album
"Mash Out"	2003	will.i.am, MC Lyte	Must B 21
"Keep Bouncin' (Street)"	2006	Too Short, will.i.am, Snoop Dogg	Blow The Whistle
"All Night Long"	2006	P. Diddy	Press Play
"I'm Chillin'"	2006	The Game	Doctor's Advocate
"Glad You're Here"	2007	Macy Gray	Big
"Beat It 2008"	2008	Michael Jackson	Thriller 25
"The Look Of Love"	2008	Sérgio Mendes	Encanto
"Back to the Future	2009	Pitbull	International Takeover: The United Nations
"Quando, Quando, Quando"	2009	will.i.am	Nine
"Paradise City"	2010	Slash, Cypress Hill	Slash
"Feel Alive"	2012	Pitbull, DJ Poet	Step Up Revolution
"LA"	2015	The Game, will.i.am, Snoop Dogg	The Documentary 2

== Music videos ==
=== As lead artist ===
List of music videos, showing year released and directors
Title	Year	Director(s)	Ref.
"London Bridge"	2006	Marc Webb	
"Fergalicious"	2006	Fatima Robinson	
"Glamorous"	2007	Dave Meyers	
"Big Girls Don't Cry"	2007	Anthony Mandler	
"Clumsy"	2007	Rich Lee; Marc Webb	
"Finally" (Unreleased)	2008	Marc Webb	
"A Little Party Never Killed Nobody (All We Got)"	2013	Philip Andelman; Fatima Robinson	
"L.A. Love (La La)" (Remix)	2014	Rich Lee	
"M.I.L.F. $"	2016	Colin Tilley	
"Life Goes On"	2016	Chris Marrs Piliero	
"Hungry"	2017	Bruno Ilogti	
"You Already Know"	2017	Bruno Ilogti	
"Enchanté (Carine)"	2017	Bruno Ilogti	
"Just Like You"	2017	Bruno Ilogti	
"Like It Ain't Nuttin'"	2017	Ben Mor	
"Save It Till Morning"	2017	Alek Keshishian	
"A Little Work"	2017	Jonas Åkerlund	
"Love Is Blind"	2017	Chris Ullens	
"Love Is Pain"	2017	Nina McNeely	
"Tension"	2017	Fatima Robinson	
"Tension" (Version 2)	2017	Fatima Robinson	
"Too Much x London Bridge"	2025	Lena Dunham	

=== As featured artist ===
List of music videos, showing year released and directors
Title	Year	Director(s)	Ref.
"Impacto" (Remix) (Daddy Yankee featuring Fergie)	2007	The Saline Project	
"Party People" (Nelly featuring Fergie)	2008	Marc Webb	
"That Ain't Cool" (Kumi Koda featuring Fergie)	2008	Fatima Robinson	
"It's A New Day" (will.i.am)	2008	Ben Mor	
"We Are the World 25 for Haiti" (Fergie among Artists for Haiti)	2010	Paul Haggis	
"Gettin' Over You" (David Guetta and Chris Willis featuring Fergie and LMFAO)	2010	Rich Lee	
"Beautiful Dangerous" (Slash featuring Fergie)	2010	Rich Lee	
"L.O.V.E. (Let One Voice Emerge)" (featuring various artists)	2012	David Galvez, Jr	
