= List of awards and nominations received by Fergie =

Fergie awards and nominations
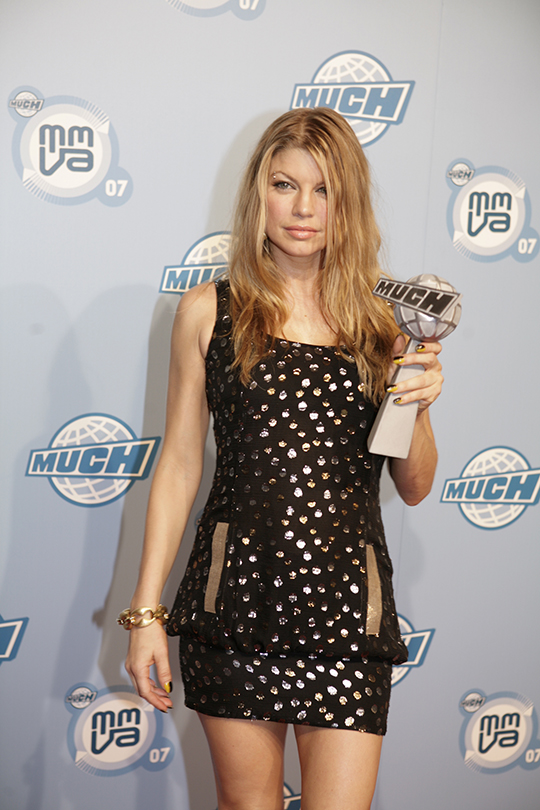
Awards and nominations
Award	Wins	Nominations
American Music Awards	9	12
Grammy Awards	8	20

Totals (Note: Certain award groups do not simply award one winner. They acknowledge several different recipients, have runners-up, and have third place. Since this is a specific recognition and is different from losing an award, runner-up mentions are considered wins in this award tally. For simplification and to avoid errors, each award in this list has been presumed to have had a prior nomination.)
- Wins: 70
- Nominations: 170

Fergie is an American singer, songwriter, rapper, fashion designer and actress. She has won a total of 70 (career solo and Black Eyed Peas) awards.

== ALMA Awards ==
Year	Recipient	Award	Result
2009	The Black Eyed Peas	Year in Music Special Achievement Honoree	Nominated

== American Music Awards ==
The American Music Awards are an award show created in 1973.

Year	Recipient	Award	Result
2003	The Black Eyed Peas	Favorite Rap/Hip-Hop Band/Duo/Group	Nominated
2005	The Black Eyed Peas	Favorite Pop/Rock Band/Duo/Group	Won
2005	The Black Eyed Peas	Favorite Rap/Hip-Hop Band/Duo/Group	Won
2006	The Black Eyed Peas	Favorite Rap/Hip-Hop Band/Duo/Group	Won
2006	The Black Eyed Peas	Favourite Soul/R&B Band/Duo/Group	Won
2006	Monkey Business (Black Eyed Peas album)	Favorite Rap/Hip-Hop Album	Won
2007	Fergie	Favorite Pop/Rock Female Artist	Won
2007	Fergie	Artist Of The Year	Nominated
2009	The E.N.D (Black Eyed Peas album)	Favorite Soul/R&B Album	Nominated
2009	The Black Eyed Peas	Favorite Soul/R&B Band/Duo/Group	Won
2009	The Black Eyed Peas	Favorite Pop/Rock Band/Duo/Group	Won
2010	The Black Eyed Peas	Favorite Pop/Rock Band/Duo/Group	Won

== ASCAP ==
Year	Recipient	Award	Result
2008	Big Girls Don't Cry"	Song of the Year	Won
2008	Big Girls Don't Cry	Most Performed Song	Won
2008	"Fergalicious"	Most Performed Song	Won
2008	"Glamorous"	Most Performed Song	Won
2009	"Clumsy"	Most Performed Song	Won
2009	"Big Girls Don't Cry"	Most Performed Song	Won
2011	I Gotta Feeling {Black Eyed Peas song}	Most Performed Song	Won
2011	Imma Be (Black Eyed Peas song)	Most Performed Song	Won
2011	Meet Me Halfway (Black Eyed Peas song)	Most Performed Song	Won
2012	"Just Can't Get Enough" (Black Eyed Peas song)	Most Performed Song	Won
2012	All of the Lights (Kanye West song)	Award-winning R&B/hip-hop song	Won

== Berlin Music Video Awards ==
Berlin Music Video Awards is an annual festival and networking event that puts creators working behind the camera in the spotlight.The event takes place in Berlin, Germany and consists of music video marathons, live performances, filmmaking workshops and networking events. Creators can apply to several different categories including: Best Animation, Best Song, Best Narrative, Best Concept, Best Director, Best Editor, Best Experimental, Best Visual Effects, Most Trashy, Most Bizarre, Best Production Company, Best Low Budget and Best Art Director. The winners of each category, picked by a professional jury panel, compete in the finals, the Best Music Video and the main prize is 3.000€. Berlin Music Video Awards was founded in 2013 by a producer and event planner Aviel Silook.

Year	Recipient	Award	Result
2018	"Love Is Blind"	Best Animation	Nominated

== BET Awards ==
Year	Recipient	Award	Result
2010	The Black Eyed Peas	Best Group	Nominated

== Billboard Women in Music ==
Established in 2007, the Billboard Women in Music recognizes influential female artists and music executives who have made significant contributions to the business and who, through their work and continued success, inspire generations of women to take on increasing responsibilities within the field.

Year	Recipient	Award	Result
2010	Fergie	Woman of the Year	Won

== BRIT Awards ==
Year	Recipient	Award	Result
2004	The Black Eyed Peas	Best Pop Act	Nominated
2004	The Black Eyed Peas	International Group	Nominated
2006	The Black Eyed Peas	International Group	Nominated
2010	The E.N.D (Black Eyed peas album)	International Album	Nominated
2011	The Black Eyed Peas	International Group	Nominated

== Channel [V] Thailand Music Video Awards ==
Year	Recipient	Award	Result
2006	The Black Eyed Peas	Popular International Group	Won
2011	The Black Eyed Peas	Popular International Group	Won

== ECHO Awards, Germany ==
Year	Recipient	Award	Result
2006	The Black Eyed Peas	Best International Pop/Rock Group	Nominated
2010	The Black Eyed Peas	Best International Pop/Rock Group	Nominated

== Do Something Awards ==
Year	Recipient	Award	Result
2011	Fergie	Do Something Style	Nominated

== Glamour Awards ==
Year	Recipient	Award	Result
2010	Fergie	Glamour Woman of The Year	Won

== Grammy Awards ==
Year	Recipient	Award	Result
2004	"Where is the Love?" (The Black Eyed Peas song with Justin Timberlake)	Best Rap/Sung Collaboration	Nominated
2004	"Where is the Love?" (The Black Eyed Peas song with Justin Timberlake)	Record of the Year	Nominated
2005	"Let's Get It Started" (with The Black Eyed Peas)	Best Rap Performance by a Duo or Group	Won
2005	"Let's Get It Started" (with The Black Eyed Peas)	Record of the Year	Nominated
2006	"Don't Phunk with My Heart" (with The Black Eyed Peas)	Best Rap Performance by a Duo or Group	Won
2006	"Don't Phunk with My Heart" (with The Black Eyed Peas)	Best Rap Song	Nominated
2006	"Gone Going" (The Black Eyed Peas song with Jack Johnson)	Best Pop Collaboration with Vocals	Nominated
2006	"Don't Lie" (with The Black Eyed Peas)	Best Pop Performance by a Duo or Group with Vocal	Nominated
2007	"My Humps" (with The Black Eyed Peas)	Best Pop Performance by a Duo or Group with Vocal	Won
2007	"Mas Que Nada" (with Sérgio Mendes and The Black Eyed Peas)	Best Urban/Alternative Performance	Nominated
2008	"Big Girls Don't Cry"	Best Female Pop Vocal Performance	Nominated
2010	"I Gotta Feeling" (with The Black Eyed Peas)	Best Pop Performance by a Duo or Group with Vocal	Won
2010	"I Gotta Feeling" (with The Black Eyed Peas)	Record of the Year	Nominated
2010	"Boom Boom Pow" (with The Black Eyed Peas)	Best Short Form Music Video	Won
2010	"Boom Boom Pow" (with The Black Eyed Peas)	Best Dance Recording	Nominated
2010	"The E.N.D." (with The Black Eyed Peas)	Best Pop Vocal Album	Won
2010	"The E.N.D." (with The Black Eyed Peas)	Album of the Year	Nominated
2012	"All of the Lights" (with Kanye West, Rihanna and Kid Cudi)	Song of the Year	Nominated
2012	"All of the Lights" (with Kanye West, Rihanna and Kid Cudi)	Best Rap/Sung Collaboration	Won
2012	"All of the Lights" (with Kanye West, Rihanna and Kid Cudi)	Best Rap Song	Won

== IFPI Hong Kong Top Sales Music Awards ==
Year	Recipient	Award	Result
2005	Monkey Business (Black Eyed peas album)	Top 10 Best Selling Foreign Albums	Won

== Juno Awards ==
Year	Recipient	Award	Result
2006	Monkey Business (Black Eyed Peas album)	International Album Of The Year	Won
2008	The Dutchess	International Album of the Year	Nominated
2010	The E.N.D (Black Eyed Peas album)	International Album Of The Year	Nominated

== Mnet Asian Music Awards ==
Year	Recipient	Award	Result
2005	"Don't Lie" (Black Eyed Peas song)	Best International Artist	Won

== MOBO Awards ==
Year	Recipient	Award	Result
2006	The Black Eyed Peas	Best Group	Won
2010	The Black Eyed Peas	Best International Act	Nominated

== MTV Awards ==
=== Los Premios MTV Latinoamérica ===
Year	Recipient	Award	Result
2007	Fergie	Mejor Artista Nuevo Internacional (Best New International Artist)	Won

=== MTV Asia Awards ===
Year	Recipient	Award	Result
2006	The Black Eyed Peas	Favorite Pop Act	Nominated

=== MTV Australia Music Video Awards ===
Year	Recipient	Award	Result
2006	"Don't Phunk with my Heart" (Black Eyed Peas video)	Best Hip-Hop Video	Nominated
2008	Fergie	Favorite International Artist	Nominated
2008	"Clumsy"	Music Video of the Year	Nominated
2007	"Fergalicious"	Sexiest Video	Won
2007	"Fergalicious"	Best Female Artist	Nominated
2007	"London Bridge"	Best Hip-Hop Video	Nominated

=== MTV Europe Music Awards ===
Year	Recipient	Award	Result
2004	Elephunk	Best Album	Nominated
2004	The Black Eyed Peas	Best Group	Nominated
2004	The Black Eyed Peas	Best Pop Act	Won
2005	The Black Eyed Peas	Best Pop Act	Won
2005	The Black Eyed Peas	Best Group	Nominated
2006	The Black Eyed Peas	Best Group	Nominated
2009	The Black Eyed Peas	Best Group	Nominated
2009	"I Gotta Feeling" (Black Eyed peas song)	Best Song	Nominated

=== MTV Russia Music Award ===
Year	Recipient	Award	Result
2005	The Black Eyed Peas	Best International Act	Won
2006	The Black Eyed Peas	Best International Act	Won

=== MTV Video Music Awards Japan ===
Year	Recipient	Award	Result
2008	"Big Girls Don't Cry"	Best Female Video	Won

=== MTV Video Music Awards ===
Year	Recipient	Award	Result
2004	"Hey Mama" (Black Eyed Peas song)	Best Hip-Hop Video	Nominated
2004	"Hey Mama" (Black Eyed Peas song)	Best Dance Video	Nominated
2004	"Hey Mama" (Black Eyed Peas song)	Best Choreography in a Video	Won
2005	"Dont Phunk with my Heart" (Black Eyed Peas song)	Best Group Video	Nominated
2006	"My Humps" (Black Eyed Peas song)	Best Hip-Hop Video	Won
2006	"My Humps" (Black Eyed Peas song)	Ringtone of the Year	Nominated
2007	Fergie	Female Artist of the Year	Won
2016	"M.I.L.F. $"	Best Art Direction	Nominated
2016	"M.I.L.F. $"	Best Editing	Nominated

=== MTV Music Video Awards Japan ===
Year	Recipient	Award	Result
2004	"Where is the Love?" (Black Eyed Peas video)	Best Group Video	Nominated
2005	"Let's Get It Started" (Black Eyed Peas video)	Best Hip-Hop Video	Nominated
2006	"Don't Phunk with my Heart" (Black Eyed Peas video)	Best Group Video	Nominated
2006	"Don't Phunk with my Heart" (Black Eyed Peas video)	Best Pop Video	Nominated
2006	The E.N.D (Black Eyed peas album)	Album of the Year	Nominated
2010	"I Gotta Feeling" (Black Eyed peas song)	Best Karaokee! Song	Nominated
2010	"My Humps" (Black Eyed peas video)	Best Group Video	Nominated
2011	"The Time (Dirty Bit)"	Best Group Video	Nominated

== MuchMusic Video Awards ==
Year	Recipient	Award	Result
2005	"Let's Get It Started" (Black Eyed Peas song)	People's Choice: Favorite International Group	Nominated
2005	"Let's Get It Started" (Black Eyed Peas song)	Best International Video - Group	Nominated
2006	"My Humps" (Black Eyed peas song)	Best International Group	Nominated
2006	"My Humps" (Black Eyed peas song)	People's Choice: Favorite International Group	Nominated
2007	"Fergalicious"	Best International Video – Artist'	Won
2007	Fergie	People's Choice: Favorite International Artist	Nominated
2008	"Clumsy"	Best International Video – Artist	Nominated
2008	"Big Girls Don't Cry"	MuchMusic.com Most Watched Video	Nominated
2009	"Boom Boom Pow" (with the Black Eyed Peas video)	International Video of the Year - Group	Won
2010	"I Gotta Feeling" (Black Eyed peas video)	International Video of the Year - Group	Nominated

== NAACP Awards ==
Year	Recipient	Award	Result
2006	The Black Eyed Peas	Outstanding Duo or Group	Nominated
2010	The Black Eyed Peas	Outstanding Duo, Group or Collaboration	Won
2010	"Boom Boom Pow" (Black Eyed Peas video)	Outstanding Music Video	Nominated
2011	The Black Eyed Peas	Outstanding Group/Duo or Collaboration	Nominated

== NewNowNext Awards ==
Year	Recipient	Award	Result
2013	Fergie	Honor - Always Next, Forever Now Award	Won

== Nickelodeon Kids' Choice Awards ==
Year	Recipient	Award	Result
2006	The Black Eyed Peas	Favorite Music Group	Nominated
2007	The Black Eyed Peas	Favorite Music Group	Won
2008	Fergie	Favorite Female Singer	Nominated
2008	Big Girls Don't Cry	Best Song	Nominated
2010	The Black Eyed Peas	Favorite Music Group	Won
2010	"I Gotta Feeling" (Black Eyed peas song)	Favorite Song	Nominated
2011	The Black Eyed Peas	Favorite Music Group	Won
2012	The Black Eyed Peas	Favorite Music Group	Nominated

== Meus Prêmios Nick, Brazil ==
Year	Recipient	Award	Result
2007	Fergie	Best International Artist	Won

== NRJ Music Awards ==
Year	Recipient	Award	Result
2006	Monkey Business (Black Eyed peas album)	International Album Of The Year	Won
2006	The Black Eyed Peas	International Group Of The Year	Won
2007	The Black Eyed Peas	International Group Of The Year	Nominated
2008	Fergie	International Female Artist of the Year	Nominated
2010	The Black Eyed Peas	International Group Of The Year	Nominated
2010	The E.N.D (Black Eyed peas album)	International Album Of The Year	Nominated
2010	"I Gotta Feeling" (Black Eyed peas song)	International Song Of The Year	Won
2011	The Black Eyed Peas	International Group Of The Year	Won
2011	The Black Eyed Peas	Concert Of The Year	Won
2012	The Black Eyed Peas	International Group Of The Year	Nominated

== NRJ Radio Awards ==
Year	Recipient	Award	Result
2004	"Where is the Love?" (Black Eyed Peas song)	Best International Song	Won

== People's Choice Awards ==
Year	Recipient	Award	Result
2006	The Black Eyed Peas	Favorite Group	Nominated
2007	The Black Eyed Peas	Favorite Group	Nominated
2008	Fergie	Female Singer	Nominated
2008	"Big Girls Don't Cry"	Favorite Pop Song	Nominated
2009	"Labels or Love"	Favorite Song From a Soundtrack	Nominated
2010	The Black Eyed Peas	Favorite Pop Act	Nominated

== Premios 40 Principales ==
The Premios 40 Principales is an annual Spanish awards show that recognises the people and works of pop musicians.

Year	Recipient	Award	Result
2009	The Black Eyed Peas	Best International Artist	Won
2009	"I Gotta Feeling" (Black Eyed peas song)	Best International Song	Won

== Radio Music Awards ==
Year	Recipient	Award	Result
2005	The Black Eyed Peas	Artist of the Year/Mainstream Hit Radio	Nominated

== Rock (The Vote) Awards ==
Year	Recipient	Award	Result
2005	The Black Eyed Peas	Patrick Lippert Award	Won

== Satellite Awards ==
Year	Recipient	Award	Result
2009	Nine cast: Daniel Day-Lewis, Marion Cotillard, Sophia Loren, Judi Dench, Nicole Kidman, Penélope Cruz, Fergie and Kate Hudson	Satellite Award for Best Cast – Motion Picture	Won

== Soul Train Music Awards ==
Year	Recipient	Award	Result
2006	"My Humps (Black Eyed Peas song)"	Best Soul/R&B or Rap Dance Cut	Nominated

== Screen Actors Guild Awards ==
Year	Work	Category	Result
2009	Nine	Outstanding Performance by a Cast in a Motion Picture	Nominated

== Teen Choice Awards ==
Year	Recipient	Award	Result
2004	"Where is the Love?" (Black Eyed Peas song)	Rap/Hip-Hop Track	Won
2005	"Don't Phunk With My Heart" (Black Eyed Peas song)	Party Starter	Won
2006	The Black Eyed Peas	Rap Artist	Won
2007	Fergie	Choice Female Artist	Won
2009	Fergie	Choice Celebrity Dancer	Nominated
2009	"Boom Boom Pow" (Black Eyed Peas song)	Rap/Hip-Hop track	Won
2009	The E.N.D (Black Eyed Peas album)	Group Album	Nominated
2010	The Black Eyed Peas	Best Group	Nominated
2011	The Black Eyed Peas	Choice Music: Group	Nominated
2011	"Just Cant Get Enough"	Choice Music: R&B/Hip-Hop Track	Nominated
2011	"The Time (Dirty Bit)"	Choice Music: Single	Nominated

== TMF Awards (Netherlands) ==
Year	Recipient	Award	Result
2006	The Black Eyed Peas	Best Act International	Won

== UK Music Video Awards ==
Year	Recipient	Award	Result
2016	"M.I.L.F. $"	Best Production Design	Nominated

== Vibe Awards ==
Year	Recipient	Award	Result
2005	The Black Eyed Peas	Best Group	Nominated

== Washington DC Area Film Critics Association Awards ==
Year	Recipient	Award	Result
2009	Nine cast: Daniel Day-Lewis, Marion Cotillard, Sophia Loren, Judi Dench, Nicole Kidman, Penélope Cruz, Fergie and Kate Hudson	Best Ensemble	Nominated

== World Music Awards ==
Year	Recipient	Award	Result
2005	The Black Eyed Peas	Best Selling Pop Group	Nominated
2007	Fergie	World's Best Selling R&B Artist	Nominated
2007	Fergie	World's Best Selling New Artist	Nominated
2010	The E.N.D (Black Eyed peas album)	Best Selling Album	Nominated
2010	"I Gotta Feeling" (Black Eyed peas song)	Best Selling Single	Nominated

== Young Entertainer Awards ==
Year	Recipient	Award	Result
2016	Fergie	Lifetime Achievement Award	Won
