= Baddiewinkle =

American internet personality (1928–2025)

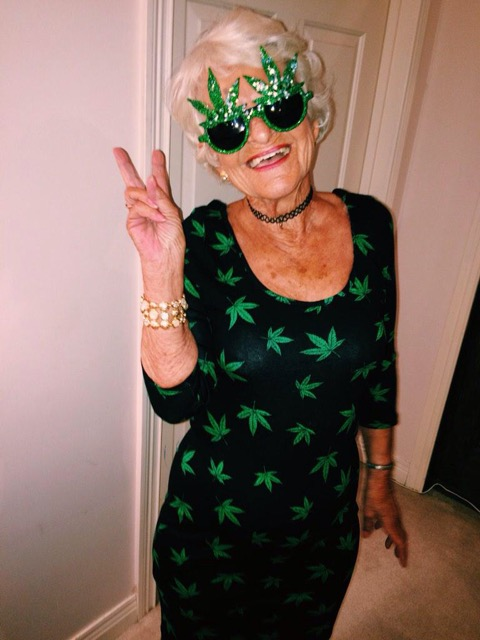
- Baddiewinkle in 2015
- Born: Helen Ruth Elam; July 18, 1928; West Liberty, Kentucky, U.S.
- Died: September 4, 2025 (aged 97); Richmond, Kentucky, U.S.
- Other name: Baddie
- Occupations: Internet personality; model
- Years active: 2014–2025
- Spouse: Earl George Van Winkle (m. 1947; died 1983)
- Children: 2

Helen Elam Van Winkle (July 18, 1928 – September 4, 2025), better known as Baddiewinkle or Baddie Winkle, was an American Internet personality. She became an Internet sensation at the age of eighty-five. Her popular social media tag line was, "Stealing Your Man Since 1928".

Winkle had millions of followers and views on social media, where she posted photos and videos of herself, often with suggestive clothing with peculiar prints, or little clothing in order to encourage body positivity and the celebration of the physiques of elderly people.

== Early life ==
Elam was born in West Liberty, Kentucky, on July 18, 1928, and grew up on a farm in Richmond. She spent 28 years working for Dresser Industries, ordering gauges for machines.

== Career ==
Winkle started posting on the internet in 2014, after initially getting help from her great-granddaughter, Kennedy Dechet, to upload an image to Twitter, while wearing her great-granddaughter's clothes. She was subsequently followed by Rihanna, and thereafter received a worldwide following. In 2015, she reached one million followers on Instagram. That year, she appeared on Today Australia.

She was known for her humor and for fighting against ageism through her personal style and messaging, characterized by wearing eccentric clothes, promoting the legalization of medical marijuana, and her innuendo. Winkle was an activist and influencer whose self-expression was a statement of disapproval of the beauty industry and the false limitations it imposes on individuals, and especially on women.

In 2015, Grit Creative Group used her as the face of their website launch campaign, where she dressed as Kurt Cobain, Kate Moss, and others. Winkle appeared on the second-season premiere of Nicole Richie's Candidly Nicole on VH1. She also appeared on the red carpet at the Netflix promotion for Orange Is the New Black. She attended the 2015 MTV Video Music Awards as a guest of Miley Cyrus and MTV. Furthermore, in 2015, she starred in LunchMoney Lewis' "Ain't Too Cool" music video.

In August 2016, she was a guest on MTV's Ridiculousness. Time magazine included Winkle in its "30 Most Influential People on the Internet" list in March 2016. Winkle was also named "Instagrammer of the Year" at the 2016 Shorty Awards on April 11, 2016. In 2016, the fashion brand Missguided announced Baddie Winkle as their Christmas campaign spokeswoman. Winkle appeared in her first national commercial for Smirnoff ICE Electric Flavors as part of the company's "Keep It Moving" campaign in 2016. She starred in Fergie's "Life Goes On" music video in 2016. In 2017, Winkle published her first book, titled Baddiewinkle's Guide to Life.

In 2019, Winkle collaborated with INC.redible Cosmetics. Winkle was the face of the hair care brand Aussie's Blonde Hydration range in 2020. Winkle partnered with Tillamook Ice Cream to present their campaign in 2021. She featured in Sally Beauty's ad campaign which focused on self-expression and empowerment through brightly colored hair.

== Personal life and death ==
Elam was married to Earl George Van Winkle from 1947 until his death in a car accident in 1983, on their 36th wedding anniversary. Her son, Kenneth David, died of bone cancer in 1999. She also had a daughter, Belinda Lovell. She also had five grandchildren, three great-grandchildren and one great-great-grandchild.

Winkle died on September 4, 2025, at her home in Richmond, Kentucky at the age of 97. She was buried at Flatwoods Cemetery, in Waco, Kentucky.
