= You Already Know =

Single by Fergie featuring Nicki Minaj

from the album Double Dutchess
- Released: August 25, 2017
- Studio: The Future (Hollywood, CA); The Village Recorder (Los Angeles, CA); AIR Studios (London, England); Milkboy Studios (Philadelphia, PA)
- Genre: Hip house
- Length: 4:08 (single version); 6:28 (album version)
- Label: Retrofuture; BMG
- Songwriters: Fergie Duhamel; William Adams; Onika Tanya Maraj; James Brown; Antonio Hardy
- Producer: will.i.am

Fergie singles chronology
"Life Goes On" (2016)	"You Already Know" (2017)	"Save It Til Morning" (2017)

Nicki Minaj singles chronology
"You da Baddest" (2017)	"You Already Know" (2017)	"MotorSport" (2017)

Music video
- "You Already Know" on YouTube

"You Already Know" is a song recorded by the American singer Fergie, featuring guest vocals from rapper Nicki Minaj. It was released on August 25, 2017, alongside the promotional single "Hungry" as the third single from Fergie's second studio album, Double Dutchess (2017), the same day the album was made available for pre-order. "You Already Know" impacted mainstream and rhythmic radio on September 12, 2017. As of September 2017, "You Already Know" moved almost 56,600 copies in the United States according to Nielsen SoundScan.

== Background ==
"You Already Know" has been described as a song with 1990s house influences. It samples "It Takes Two" by Rob Base and DJ E-Z Rock, which in turn samples the Lyn Collins 1972 song "Think (About It)". Prior to the song's release, a lyric about Minaj's ex-boyfriend Meek Mill, was changed following their breakup in January 2017. The single was written by Fergie and Minaj, with will.i.am handling the song's production. Fergie first teased the collaboration in a radio interview in late 2014 while promoting "L.A. Love (La La)". The song was performed live for the first time on Rock in Rio Lisboa on May 20, 2016.

Fergie spoke about the song, saying:

This is about us standing together as #Girlbosses. We have both worked very hard for what we have, and still continue to do so. I'm a fighter! And so is she! We have the same goal. I'm all about women not being pitted against each other. I'm about, 'Let's stand strong'.

— Fergie, Entertainment Weekly

== Critical reception ==
Jordan Miller of Breathe Heavy reacted positively towards the song, calling it "fresh to death". In particular he praised Minaj's verse. Stereogum placed the song as the third best track of the week, with the senior editor Tom Breihan calling it a monster: "It's a big, shameless endorphin-rush pop megablast, a riot of synth-bloop hooks and James Brown drum-breaks and house pianos and ecstatic diva-wails.". Breihan also shows surprise with Fergie's rap skills. It was considered the fortieth best song of 2017 by Rolling Stone.

== Personnel ==
Taken from Tidal.

- Fergie – vocals, performer, songwriter
- Nicki Minaj – vocals, featured artist, performer, songwriter
- will.i.am – producer
- Joel Metzler – vocal producer
- Aubrey Delaine – vocal producer
- Johannes Raasina – mixing engineer
- Padraic Kerin – engineer
- Joe Peluso – engineer

== Charts ==
Chart (2017)	Peak position
Australia (ARIA)	95
Canadian Digital Song Sales (Billboard)	9
UK Singles (OCC)	96
UK Indie (OCC)	19
US Digital Song Sales (Billboard)	27

== Release history ==
Region	Date	Format	Label	Ref.
Various	August 25, 2017	Digital download	Dutchess Music	
United States	September 12, 2017	Contemporary hit radio	BMG	
United States	September 12, 2017	Rhythmic contemporary	BMG	
