= Life Goes On (Fergie song) =

Single by Fergie

from the album Double Dutchess
- Released: November 11, 2016
- Recorded: 2016
- Studio: Kite Music Studios (Los Angeles, CA); HQ Studios (North Hollywood, CA)
- Genre: Tropical house
- Length: 3:50 (single version); 4:26 (album version)
- Label: Retrofuture; BMG; Interscope
- Songwriters: Fergie Duhamel; Toby Gad; Tristan Prettyman; Keith Harris; George Pajon, Jr.
- Producers: Toby Gad; Keith Harris; Fergie Duhamel

Fergie singles chronology
"M.I.L.F. $" (2016)	"Life Goes On" (2016)	"You Already Know" (2017)

Music video
- "Life Goes On" on YouTube

"Life Goes On" is a song recorded by American singer Fergie for her second studio album, Double Dutchess (2017). It was released as a single on November 11, 2016, by Retrofuture Productions and BMG. The song serves as the second single from Fergie's second studio album, following "M.I.L.F. $". "Life Goes On" was written by Fergie, Tristan Prettyman, Keith Harris and Toby Gad.

The song marks Fergie's final release for Interscope Records, after the singer left the label in May 2017 to form her own record label, Dutchess Music, under BMG.

== Background and release ==
Fergie was first expected to release "You Already Know", a song featuring Nicki Minaj, as the third single from Double Dutchess. In an unexpected move, "Life Goes On" was released instead. It was meant to showcase a more vulnerable side to the record after “L.A. Love (La La)” and “M.I.L.F. $”, two uptempo tracks. Some critics commented on how the song was unintentionally topical, in that its release coincided with the week that Donald Trump was elected as the 45th President of the United States.

About the claims, the singer stated that “It all felt like the right sentiment at the right time. The universe works in really weird ways. It just felt like the world needs healing,” before adding: “I just wanted to... peel back the layers and show my vulnerable side because there’s so much vulnerability on my album that I just wanted people to know that it’s not just one thing.”

== Promotion ==
Fergie performed the song on The Late Show with Stephen Colbert on December 2, 2016. She additionally performed the song on The Today Show on the same day.

== Critical reception ==
Many critics noted how the single was a change in genre from Fergie's previous single, M.I.L.F. $, with Rap-Up calling it more "Top 40-ready". Samantha Benitz of Hollywood Life praised Fergie's strong vocals and "swag filled persona". Hugh McIntyre of Forbes referred to the song as "existing somewhere in between lounge fodder and the dancefloor, perhaps not perfect for either, but still welcome none the less", and also claimed that Fergie's fanbase was "as patient as any pop star could expect over the years when it comes to solo music from the singer", referring to the delayed release of her long-awaited second album.

== Commercial performance ==
In the United States, it was Fergie's first solo single to not charting on Billboard Hot 100 since "Labels or Love", managing only to peak on the lower ends of the Adult Top 40.

It charted on Russia's music chart at number 155, failing to impact any other country's main chart.

== Music video ==
The music video for the song was released on December 16, 2016, and features Instagram personality Baddiewinkle and Musical.ly breakout star Baby Ariel. In the Chris Marrs Piliero-directed video, Fergie is seen cruising down a highway in a convertible before she picks up Winkle and Ariel, who are hitchhiking, and brings them along to a beach party in the California coast.

== Track listing ==
Digital download
No.	Title	Length
1.	"Life Goes On"	3:50

Digital download - Life Goes On (Remixes)
No.	Title	Length
1.	"Life Goes On (Ryan Riback Remix)"	3:17
2.	"Life Goes On (Trinix Remix)"	3:01
3.	"Life Goes On (KLYMVX Remix)"	3:57
4.	"Life Goes On (NOTD Remix)"	3:03
5.	"Life Goes On (Smle Remix)"	3:35
6.	"Life Goes On (Monsieur Adi Remix)"	3:53
7.	"Life Goes On (Willem Remix)"	4:14

== Charts ==
Chart (2016)	Peak position
Canada Hot AC (Billboard)	44
Russia Airplay (Tophit)	155
US Adult Pop Airplay (Billboard)	39

== Release history ==
Region	Date	Format	Version	Label	Ref.
Worldwide	November 11, 2016	Digital download	Original	Interscope; will.i.am	
United States	November 21, 2016	Hot adult contemporary	Original	Interscope; will.i.am	
Brazil	January 27, 2017	Digital download	Remixes	Interscope; will.i.am	
