= A Little Work =

Single by Fergie

from the album Double Dutchess
- Released: November 14, 2017
- Studio: Mixstar Studios (Virginia Beach, VA); Eightysevenfourteen Studios (Los Angeles, CA)
- Genre: Pop rock; electropop; R&B
- Length: 4:05
- Label: Retrofuture; BMG
- Songwriters: Fergie Duhamel; Lukasz Gottwald; Theron Thomas; Timothy Thomas; Henry Walter
- Producer: Cirkut

Fergie singles chronology
"Save It Til Morning" (2017)	"A Little Work" (2017)

Music videos
- "A Little Work [Short Film]" on YouTube; "A Little Work [Video Cut]" on YouTube

"A Little Work" is a song recorded by American singer Fergie for her second solo studio album, Double Dutchess (2017). The song was released as the album's fifth and final single and distributed to contemporary hit radio on November 14 in the United States by Dutchess Music and BMG Rights Management.

An accompanying music video, directed by Jonas Åkerlund, was released alongside the album.

== Promotion ==
Fergie first performed the song live on The Today Show on September 22, 2017, at the launch of Double Dutchess. After the song was chosen as a single, it was promoted on The Talk on October 24, and then on The Late Late Show with James Corden on October 30. She additionally performed the song on Miss Universe on November 26 during the evening gown competition. The song was later performed on Late Night with Seth Meyers on December 14, 2017.

== Music video ==
The complete video for "A Little Work" runs for over 11 minutes and was directed by Jonas Åkerlund. Deemed a short film, it begins showing scenes of the singer battling her demons in a padded room and in a straitjacket as Fergie herself narrates how she often felt watched and how difficult it was leaving in constant fear due to drug abuse. It was then that she saw an empty church on Wilshire Boulevard, Los Angeles, and in fear of her own demons, tried to hide through the different aisles and started praying. As Fergie continues to share her story, the video also shows visions of soldiers in war before she embraces one, who wears her surname - Ferguson - on his name badge, as a kind of homage to her late grandfather, whom she calls her "guardian angel", and then flashbacks of his funeral, as she believes he was the one that guided her in the right direction. At the ending, Fergie is shown walking out of the church, holding hands with her son Axl as she realizes that she needed to honor herself, and she still works on it even today.

It enlights a specific situation in the singer's life she once narrated to Oprah Winfrey in an episode of Oprah's Next Chapter back in 2012 when talking about her previous addiction issues. "I got into a scene. I started going out and taking ecstasy. From ecstasy, it went to crystal meth. With any drugs, everything is great at the beginning, and then slowly your life starts to spiral down." She described her worst moment as being paranoid in a church and thinking that the FBI and SWAT teams were waiting for her outside. When she emerged from the building and discovered drugs were playing tricks on her and she had imagined the whole thing, she finally decided to quit it for good. To Women's Wear Daily, she said:

Jonas found this church that was going to be torn down very soon, and all this amazing graffiti that was on there [...] Part of that whole song is just a battle in your mind about overcoming negativity and anything that’s in your way, and just powering through that and finding your tools to overcome that, whatever they may be. And being in that church, there was a presence and it was thick. It was a moment, for sure.

The idea to dramatize Fergie's previous experience with addiction came after Åkerlund conducted an in-depth conversation with the singer about her life in her own home, footage which was also used in the final cut. In an interview for Rolling Stone, Fergie spoke of its conception: "It was very interesting, the idea of wanting to play that out in the cinema – and not only that, but make it larger than life, make it grand." On October 30, 2017, right before the song got serviced to radios, a short edit of the video running over 3 minutes long was uploaded to online outlets.

== Personnel ==
Taken from Tidal.

- Fergie Duhamel – vocals, performer, songwriter
- Henry Russell Walter – producer, vocals, songwriter
- Serban Ghenea – mixing engineer
- John Haynes – mixing engineer
- Rachel Findlen – engineer
- Clint Gibbs – engineer
- Jacob Kasher Hindlin – vocals
- Theron Thomas – vocals, songwriter
- Kevin Fisher – vocals
- Sophia Black – vocals
- Lukasz Gottwald – vocals, songwriter
- Chloe Angelides – vocals
- Timothy Thomas – vocals, songwriter
- Tyler Sheppard – vocals
- Jennifer Eashoo – vocals
- Cameron Montgomery – assistant engineer

== Charts ==
Chart (2017–18)	Peak position
Canada AC (Billboard)	29
Canada Hot AC (Billboard)	47
US Adult Pop Airplay (Billboard)	39
US Pop Airplay (Billboard)	36

== Release history ==
Region	Release date	Format	Label	Ref.
Various	September 22, 2017	Digital download	Dutchess Music	
United States	November 14, 2017	Contemporary hit radio	BMG	
