= Hungry (Fergie song) =

Promotional single by Fergie featuring Rick Ross

from the album Double Dutchess
- Released: August 27, 2017
- Studio: The Village Recorder (Los Angeles, CA)
- Genre: Hip hop; pop
- Length: 3:23
- Label: Dutchess; BMG
- Songwriters: Fergie Duhamel; Lisa Gerrard; Brendan Perry; William Roberts
- Producers: Young Yonny; JP Did This; Donut; Fergie Duhamel; Stevie Mackey; Venus Brown

Music video
- "Hungry" on YouTube

"Hungry" is a song recorded by American singer Fergie, featuring guest vocals from American rapper Rick Ross. It was released officially on August 25, 2017, as a promotional single from Fergie's second studio album, Double Dutchess. Although the song was officially released in August 2017, Fergie began teasing the song in June 2016, posting "Hungry (1st Byte)" and "Hungry (2nd Byte)". Musically, the song is a hip hop/pop track with a "stuttering beat" and Middle Eastern elements. The track contains a sample of Dead Can Dance's 1987 song "Dawn of the Iconoclast".

The song received a positive feedback from music critics, with most praising Fergie's vocals and the production, although some felt the track came across as more of an interlude. The music video was directed by Bruno Ilogti.

== Critical reception ==
Upon release, the song received generally positive reviews. Jon Wiederhorn of Radio.com praised for "stuttering beat and sensual vocals". Idolator's Mike Wass described the song as "hypnotic hip-hop track" and believed that it "sounds more like an interlude than an actual song". Tara Joshi of The Guardian said that the song "is all sassy delivery and theatrical production that prove Fergie an unstoppable force of hip-hop-infused pop".

== Music videos ==
"Hungry (1st Byte)" was released on June 9, 2016. After its release, it was presumed that "Hungry" would be an intro track for Fergie's second album. In the video, there are snakes, spiders, fire and a broken glass. MTV's Madeline Roth described the music video as "exciting, promising sign of more to come". Brennan Carley of Spin called it "stylish as hell".

"Hungry (2nd Byte)" was released on June 28, 2016. In the video, it confirmed the title of Fergie's second studio album, as her husband Josh Duhamel said in an interview, Double Dutchess. The official music video was released on August 24, 2017. It was directed by Bruno Ilogti and Giovanni Bianco.

The official music video was released on August 24, 2017. It features Rick Ross is featured on it, and was also directed by Bruno Ilogti and Giovanni Bianco.

== Credits and personnel ==
Recording and management

- Recorded at The Village Recorder (Los Angeles, California)
- Mixed at Brownsville Studios (New York City)
- Mastered at Engine Room (New York City)
- Headphone Junkie Publishing (ASCAP); BMG Gold Songs (ASCAP) on behalf of Momentum Music Ltd.; Beggars Banquet Music Ltd. (PRS); 4 Blunts Lit at Once/Sony/ATV Songs LLC
- Contains excerpts from "Dawn of the Iconoclast" written by Lisa Gerrard and Brendan Perry and published by Momentum Music Ltd. C/o BMG Gold Songs (ASCAP); Beggars Banquet Music Ltd. (PRS) used by permission. All rights reserved
- Rick Ross appears courtesy of Epic Records.

Personnel

- Fergie Duhamel – vocals, songwriting, vocal production
- Lisa Gerrard – songwriting
- Brendan Perry – songwriting
- William Roberts – guest vocals, songwriting
- Young Yonny – production
- JP Did This – production
- Donut – co-production
- Venus Brown – mixing, additional vocal producer
- Stevie Mackey – vocal production
- Patrizio Pigliapoco – mixing
- Alex Williams – engineering
- Mark Christiansan – mastering

Credits adapted from Double Dutchess liner notes.

== Release history ==
Region	Date	Format	Label
United States	August 25, 2017	Digital download	Dutchess Music
