= Dennis Woodruff =

American actor (1952–2024)

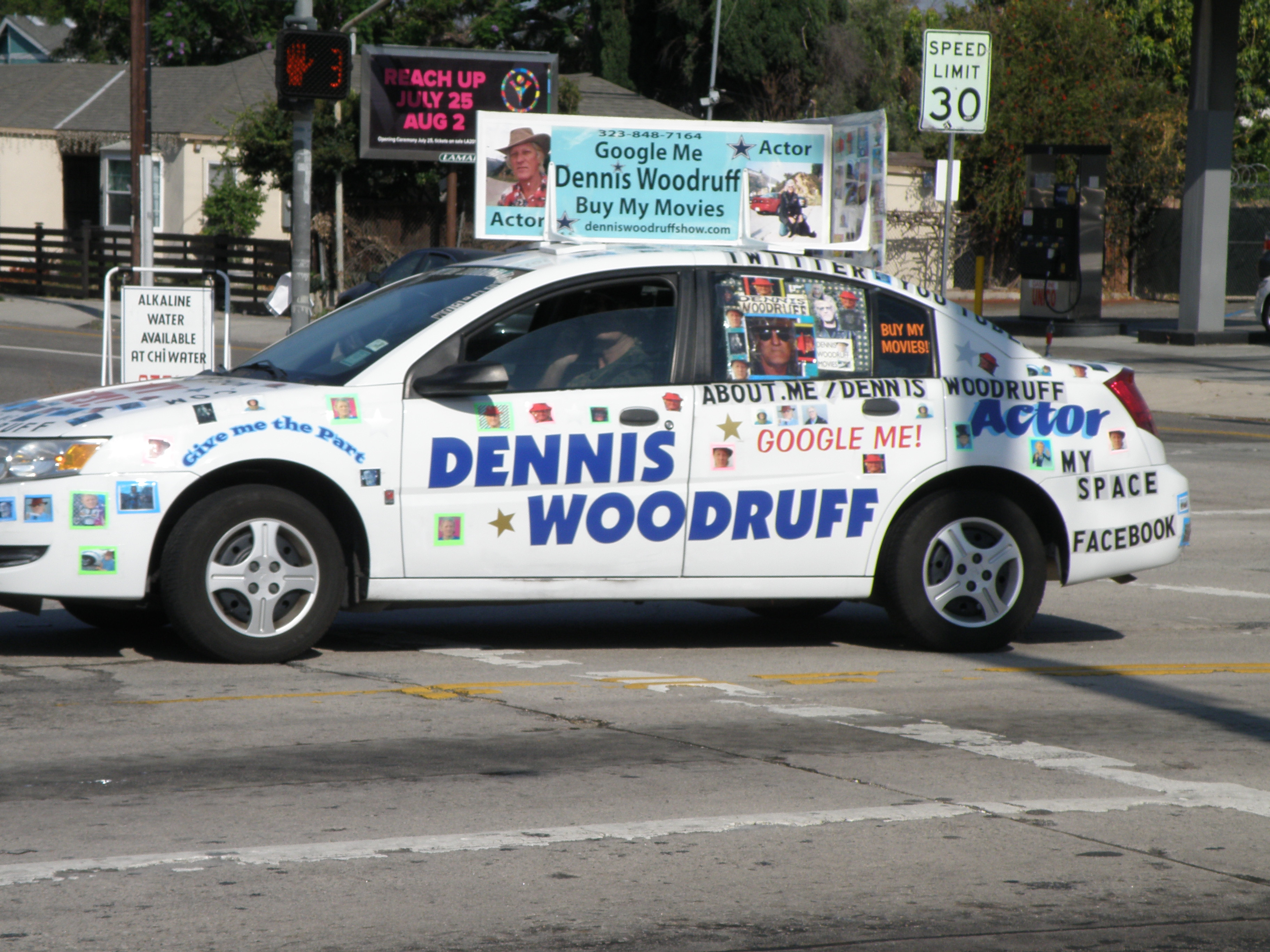
- Woodruff in his car, 2015
- Born: July 16, 1952; Huntington Beach, California, U.S.
- Died: October 1, 2024 (aged 72); Los Angeles, California, U.S.
- Occupations: Actor, producer, director
- Website: denniswoodruffshow.com

Dennis Woodruff (July 16, 1952 – October 1, 2024) was an American actor, producer, and director who was based in Los Angeles. He was known for his ostentatious self-promotion of his services as an actor, and for his fleet of hand decorated "art cars". Much of his fame was derived from his lack of success in the movie industry.

== Career ==
In the 1980s, Woodruff began to decorate cars in order to advertise his acting career. He was producing his own movies by the 2000s. He would leave his cars parked in prominent places to serve as personal promotion. He would also hand out flyers to movie producers and distributors at Hollywood events. He started a production company, Dennis Woodruff Entertainment, with his brother Scott. They ran it out of a mobile home in Los Angeles.

Woodruff was given background roles in works such as Quantum Leap, RoboCop 2, Serious Money, and Toys. He featured in Harrod Blank's documentary Automorphosis, which focused on art cars and their artists.

In 2020, Woodruff stated that he had created 28 movies and 3 television programs alongside collaborator Keith Kurlander. He declared that he had "made more movies than Tarantino or anyone in Hollywood". He sold physical copies of his films from the trunk of his car, and claimed to make $100,000 doing so annually. He was also known for giving tours on Hollywood Boulevard and selling his movies to tourists.

== Personal life ==
Woodruff was born in Huntington Beach, California. He was the grandson of S. H. Woodruff, a prominent developer of Hollywoodland. In 2000, the Los Angeles Times wrote that it was "hard to live in L.A. and not know who Dennis Woodruff is". He stated that his public persona was a character that he played.

On October 2, 2024, Keith Kurlander announced the death of Woodruff. He died alone at his West Hollywood apartment on October 1. He had no close next of kin.
