= L.A. Love (La La) =

Single by Fergie

from the album Double Dutchess
- Released: September 29, 2014
- Recorded: 2014
- Studio: Windmark Recording Studios (Los Angeles, CA); Westlake Recording Studios (Los Angeles, CA)
- Genre: Pop rap
- Length: 3:12; 3:31 (remix)
- Label: will.i.am; Interscope
- Songwriters: Fergie Duhamel; Dijon McFarlane; Shomari Wilson; Royce Thomas; Theron Thomas
- Producers: Mustard; Shonuff; Fergie

Fergie singles chronology
"A Little Party Never Killed Nobody (All We Got)" (2013)	"L.A. Love (La La)" (2014)	"M.I.L.F. $" (2016)

Music video
- "L.A. Love (La La)" on YouTube

"L.A. Love (La La)" is a song recorded by American singer Fergie. It was co-written by Fergie and the song's producer DJ Mustard, with additional writing credits from Shomari Wilson, Royce Thomas, and Theron Thomas. The remix version of the song, which features California rapper and DJ Mustard colleague YG, was included on her second studio album Double Dutchess (2017). "L.A. Love (La La)" was used as background music in commercials for the 2015 Chrysler 200 and was also used as the theme song for the reality television series Kourtney and Khloé Take The Hamptons and Togetherness and video game NBA 2K16.

== Background ==
In January 2014, Fergie began work on a second studio album. The first single from the album, "L.A. Love (La La)", was produced by DJ Mustard and released on September 30, 2014, by Interscope Records. The song was available for digital download and released to contemporary hit radio on September 30, 2014. Prior to the song's official release, an unfinished looped version leaked online. The official remix was released on October 21, 2014, featuring Compton rapper YG, which ultimately became the version used in the music video for the song and later on the album.

== Critical reception ==
"L.A.LOVE (la la)"
A sample of "L.A.LOVE (la la)"

"L.A. Love (La La)" received mixed reviews from music critics. Lauren Stampler for Time Magazine wrote that "It's a pop song that lists off as many random city names it can in approximately three minutes' time. A beloved but often unheralded genre, it's long overdue for some recognition." Bradley Stern of MuuMuse wrote that "Fergie Ferg keeps things squarely in hip-pop territory just as she did nearly a decade ago (but with fresher beats), spitting above a murky '2 On'-ish #SomethingMoreUrban beat while delivering a series of shout-outs to every city, state and country 'round the globe that you (may or may not) already know." Direct Lyrics review said that "Fergie thinks she's still living in the early 2000s and I love it. 'L.A Love (La La)' is certainly taking me back to those years when pop music felt more fun, fresh and unaffected." Lewis Cornor from Digital Spy gave the song four out of five stars saying that "'L.A. Love' is just as catchy and addictive as anything on The Dutchess". Maximum Pop! wrote that, after an eight-year break, "Fergie has instantaneously captured our attention with a regenerated DJ Mustard beat that will get stuck in your head for weeks."

Alexa Camp of Slant Magazine wrote that "Fergie swaps London for, despite the song's title, 'every city, every state, every country, you know,' and at one point even crams three terrible accents—British, Jamaican, and French—into one bar. While the DJ Mustard-produced track is a definite earworm, hopefully the singer, ever the crossover-pop diplomat, has some more multi-format tricks up her sleeve." Robbie Daw for Idolator wrote that "the DJ Mustard-produced track finds the 39-year-old Black Eyed Peas diva surprisingly stuck in creative rut, spouting out a slew of hip-hop-lite cliches that, to be honest, we would have expected her to have left behind sometime around The E.N.D." While calling it "irritating" and "infectious", Carolyn Menyes for Music Times says, "though the song itself isn't a massive standout, featuring repetitive lyrics and a melody that could have been jacked from any Iggy Azalea single, it's hard not to walk away from the track without humming the melody."

Lindsey Weber of Vulture gave a negative review, writing that "the long-awaited Fergie comeback is upon us ... and it sounds a lot like 'Rack City'. 'L.A. Love (La La)' just happens to be the Animaniacs' 'Nations of the World' for our new pop generation — but it only features cool places like Puerto Rico, Vegas, Rio, Tokyo, São Paulo, Miami, and Jamaica. It's a party-hopper's geography lesson, okay?" Jacques Peterson for Pop Dust panned the song, writing that "there isn't a whole lot more to 'L.A. Love (La La)' than a mindless geography lesson over the top of one of those hot DJ Mustard beats that we've already heard ten times before, which is a damn shame when you remember that Fergie is one of the biggest female artists of the 2000s."

== Music video ==
The video for the song was directed by Rich Lee, who had worked with Fergie before on music videos for "Clumsy", "Imma Be Rocking That Body", "Gettin' Over You", "The Time (Dirty Bit)" and "Beautiful Dangerous". It was released on November 10, 2014.

The centerpiece of the video is a double-decker Day of the Dead-style party bus inspired by art cars at Burning Man. The bus design had to change from its initial concept, which was conceived by Fergie as she recorded the song. "It was made of clouds originally, and it has spinners, but the spinners were eyes", Fergie explained, adding, "It's kind of psychedelic, which possibly has to do with all the psychedelia I'm seeing in these kids cartoons that I'm watching [...] This trip around the world that this bus takes, it's also a trip in your mind."

The singer busts into the track while all over Los Angeles in the bus with many celebrity cameos, beginning with YG, who guests in the song, and DJ Mustard, who produced it. Hilary Swank, Kelly Osbourne, Tommy Chong, Wilmer Valderrama, Mike Will Made It, Rae Sremmurd, Blake Griffin, Taboo, Apl.de.ap, Sen Dog, Ryan Seacrest, Koda Kumi, Dean and Dan Caten, Dennis Woodruff, Josh Richman, Big Kim, James Goldstein, Chris Paul, DeAndre Jordan, Big Boy and Louie G can all be briefly seen. Chelsea Handler is credited as "the irresponsible raver mom".

== Commercial performance ==
"L.A. Love (La La)" debuted on the Billboard Hot 100 at number 97 for the week dated October 25, 2014. In its second week, the song jumped to number 81. In its third week, the song jumped to number 63, where it remained for an additional two weeks. It then jumped to number 41. A week later, it jumped into the top 40 at number 36, later peaking at number 27. The song debuted at number 39 on the Pop Songs chart and also debuted at number 40 on the Rhythmic chart. As of November 30, 2014, it has peaked at number 16 on Rhythmic Songs, number eight on Hot Rap Songs, number 24 on Digital Songs, and number 20 on Pop Songs radio chart.

== Track listings ==
- Digital download
1. "L.A. Love (La La)" — 3:12
- Digital download (Album Version)
1. "L.A. Love (La La)" featuring YG — 3:31
- Digital download (Remix)
1. "L.A. Love (La La)" (Remix) featuring YG — 3:31
- Digital download (Remix Movement)
1. "L.A. Love (La La)" (Jodie Harsh Remix) — 3:28
2. "L.A. Love (La La)" (Moto Blanco Remix) — 2:46
3. "L.A. Love (La La)" (Afsheen and Non Fiction Remix) — 3:01
4. "L.A. Love (La La)" (Sikdope Remix) — 4:11
- Digital download (Remix Movement) — UK version
1. "L.A. Love (La La)" (Remix) featuring YG — 3:31
2. "L.A. Love (La La)" (Jodie Harsh Remix) — 3:28
3. "L.A. Love (La La)" (Moto Blanco Remix) — 2:46
4. "L.A. Love (La La)" (Afsheen and Non Fiction Remix) — 3:01
5. "L.A. Love (La La)" (Sikdope Remix) — 4:11

== Charts ==
Weekly chart performance
Chart (2014–2015)	Peak position
Australia (ARIA)	53
Australia Urban (ARIA)	5
Belgium (Ultratip Bubbling Under Flanders)	34
Belgium Urban (Ultratop Flanders)	26
Belgium (Ultratip Bubbling Under Wallonia)	11
Canada Hot 100 (Billboard)	28
Canada CHR/Top 40 (Billboard)	30
Czech Republic Airplay (ČNS IFPI)	62
Czech Republic Singles Digital (ČNS IFPI)	24
France (SNEP)	72
Germany (GfK)	55
Hungary (Stream Top 40)	34
Ireland (IRMA)	30
Israel International Airplay (Media Forest)	10
Netherlands (Dutch Top 40 Tipparade)	19
Poland Dance (ZPAV)	20
Scottish Singles Sales (Official Charts)	4
Slovakia Singles Digital (ČNS IFPI)	25
South Korea International (GAON)	95
Sweden (Sverigetopplistan)	90
UK Singles (Official Charts)	3
UK Hip Hop/R&B (Official Charts)	1
US Billboard Hot 100	27
US Hot Rap Songs (Billboard)	5
US Pop Airplay (Billboard)	20
US Rhythmic Airplay (Billboard)	14

== Certifications ==
Certifications and sales
Region	Certification	Certified units/sales
New Zealand (RMNZ)	Platinum	30,000^{‡}
United Kingdom (BPI)	Gold	400,000^{‡}
United States (RIAA)	Platinum	1,000,000^{‡}
^{‡} Sales+streaming figures based on certification alone.

== Release history ==
Country	Date	Format	Label	Ref.
France	September 29, 2014	Digital download	Polydor	
Germany	September 29, 2014	Digital download	Universal	
Italy	September 29, 2014	Digital download	Universal	
Spain	September 29, 2014	Digital download	Universal	
United States	September 30, 2014	Contemporary hit radio	Interscope	
United States	October 27, 2014	Digital download (Remix)	Interscope	
Germany	October 31, 2014	Digital download (Remix)	Universal	
France	November 3, 2014	Digital download (Remix)	Polydor	
Italy	November 3, 2014	Digital download (Remix)	Universal	
Spain	November 3, 2014	Digital download (Remix)	Universal	
Italy	January 2, 2015	Contemporary hit radio	Universal	
France	January 13, 2015	Digital download (Remix Movement)	Polydor	
Germany	January 13, 2015	Digital download (Remix Movement)	Universal	
Italy	January 13, 2015	Digital download (Remix Movement)	Universal	
Spain	January 13, 2015	Digital download (Remix Movement)	Universal	
United States	January 13, 2015	Digital download (Remix Movement)	Interscope	
United Kingdom	January 25, 2015	Digital download	Polydor	
United Kingdom	January 25, 2015	Digital download (Remix Movement)	Polydor	
