= Double Dutchess =

Studio album by Fergie
- Released: September 22, 2017
- Recorded: 2014–2017
- Studios: Los Angeles, California (The Village Recorder, Record Plant, Roccage, Eightsevenfourteen, Kite Music, Chalice, Conway, Windmark; The Future; HQ); Santa Monica, California (No Excuses, Interscope); Virginia Beach, Virginia (Mixstar); London, UK (AIR)
- Genre: Hip-hop
- Length: 56:54
- Labels: Dutchess; Retrofuture; BMG
- Producers: Alesso; DJ Ammo; Philip "DJ Hardwerk" Constable; Cirkut; Fixyn; Mr. Franks; Toby Gad; Keith Harris; Adam Kapit; JP Did This; Dr. Luke; Dijon "DJ Mustard" McFarlane; Polow da Don; will.i.am; Yonni; Leon "RoccStar" Youngblood

Fergie chronology
The Dutchess (2006)	Double Dutchess (2017)

Singles from Double Dutchess
- 1. "M.I.L.F. $" Released: July 1, 2016; 2. "Life Goes On" Released: November 11, 2016; 3. "You Already Know" Released: August 25, 2017; 4. "Save It Til Morning" Released: November 10, 2017; 5. "A Little Work" Released: November 14, 2017

Double Dutchess is the second studio album by American singer Fergie. It was released on September 22, 2017. The album is the singer's first to be released under her own imprint, Dutchess Music, in a partnership with Retrofuture Productions and BMG Rights Management, and first since her solo debut, The Dutchess (2006). Promotion for the album began with the release of the album's first single "M.I.L.F. $" in July 2016, followed by the release of "Life Goes On" in November that same year. "You Already Know" was released as the third single on September 12, 2017. The album includes collaborations with Nicki Minaj, YG, Rick Ross, and Fergie's son Axl Jack.

== Background ==
After concluding two worldwide tours with the Black Eyed Peas in support of The E.N.D. (2009) and The Beginning (2010) from 2009 to 2011, Fergie decided to take a break from the group to concentrate on her solo career, mentioning that she had begun writing on her own for her second studio album – a follow-up to The Dutchess (2006) – although she didn't want to "rush anything out." She made her comeback as a solo artist in June 2013 with the song "A Little Party Never Killed Nobody (All We Got)", which was included on the soundtrack of Baz Luhrmann's The Great Gatsby (2013). Featuring rappers Q-Tip and GoonRock, the track experienced commercial success. In August 2013, Fergie gave birth to her first son with husband Josh Duhamel, Axl Jack. This was followed by an announcement that the singer was in the beginning stages of recording her sophomore solo set in January 2014, scheduled for an early 2015 release. She stated in an interview with radio host Ryan Seacrest that the Black Eyed Peas bandmate and longtime collaborator will.i.am would be handling the production.

== Production ==
Fergie sought to assume more prominent creative control over the album, having co-produced 12 out of 13 tracks on the record and co-written all of them. She stated: "Becoming a mom and getting pregnant reset me. I just got on my game. I've never taken on this much responsibility and I kept wanting to make it better and better. I wanted to strive for greatness," adding, "You have to at a certain point just let go and say, 'This song is done.'" That first resulted in "L.A. Love (La La)", a DJ Mustard-produced song with hip-hop and pop influences reminiscent of her first record that was released on September 30, 2014. Amid moderate success and mixed reactions to the single, work on the album continued, with Mike Will Made It, RoccStar and Philip "Hardwork" Constable all expected to be involved. About the sound of the record, RoccStar said it was "The Dutchess mixed in with Rihanna", with more edge and ahead of the current musical movement. Charlie Puth revealed he worked with Fergie on a song he defined as a 2015 "My Humps", but it did not make the final cut. Despite previous reports, the singer announced in June 2015 that she was still putting the finishing touches on the album and had moved out of her own house to do so without any disruptions. She spent some time located in the Morning View Studios living facility, situated inside a mansion on a secluded estate in Malibu, the same location where parts of The Dutchess were recorded about nine years earlier.

In January 2016, a video of dancers dancing to "Like It Ain't Nuttin'" surfaced online along with a still of the video, suggesting the track could be the new lead single off the record. A month later, a demo for the song was leaked. In the meantime, Fergie's husband Josh Duhamel slipped in an interview that the album would be titled Double Dutchess and most likely be out in March of that same year. At that point, due to overall frustration, she had decided to do a video for every song to make up for so many delays. Fergie revealed she had gotten off to Paris and London to shoot art for the album and had shot several videos to coincide with the launch. One of the directors for these videos was Ben Mor, who had worked with the singer previously on the visuals for "I Gotta Feeling" and "Don't Stop the Party".

Fergie performed "You Already Know" and "Love is Pain" live for the first time during her Rock in Rio Lisboa performance on May 20, 2016. Interludes with new songs "Just Like You" and "Hungry" were also used, while the latter had its video snippet uploaded to Fergie's Instagram account that same day. A new teaser titled "Hungry (1st Byte)" was uploaded to Fergie's Vevo channel on June 9, 2016, being followed by "Hungry (2nd Byte)" on June 22, which also confirmed the rumored album title. A few days later it was officially announced that a new song titled "M.I.L.F. $" would be released; produced by Polow da Don, it was made available for purchase on July 1, 2016. Fergie was inspired to write the empowering song after becoming a mother. On November 11, 2016, Fergie released the third single from the record, "Life Goes On". In a Facebook Live Q&A, Fergie announced that the album was to be released in January 2017, however it was delayed and was rescheduled to be released in the first quarter of 2017. During the live chat, she stated: "[I've] put blood, sweat and tears into this album and there's personal stuff, there's pop stuff, hip-hop stuff, throwback stuff – I always like a little throwback – some reggae, R&B, ballads, fun, silly, all of the above. [...] So it's kind of, I'm going to use the word 'cornucopia' again because it's Thanksgiving time."

In May 2017, it was announced that Fergie had parted ways – by mutual decision – with longtime label Interscope and would launch her own imprint, Dutchess Music, as part of a global partnership with BMG, taking her catalogue along with her. In announcing the signing, the label's executive vice president Jon Cohen stated: “What Fergie has put together with Double Dutchess is so inventive it redefines her as an artist. Her prolific output has already made our collaboration one of my most exciting times with BMG and we can't wait for its reveal.” In July, an unfinished version of the entire album leaked onto the internet after the songs were accidentally uploaded to a BMG database in the midst of transitioning to the label. On August 5, Fergie took to social media to respond to the leak, sharing a mysterious teaser with the words "Exposed, but not fully." The album was made available for pre-order from August 25, 2017, with a September 22 release date.

== Title and artwork ==
The album's title, Double Dutchess, is a nod to Fergie's first record, going as further to be described as "The Dutchess part two", though it goes a bit deeper than that: it also refers to “the duality of my personality, the dark and the light, the hard and the soft, the girl with the mask on with all the frills and stuff, and then taking away that mask and seeing what's underneath all that,” as the singer explained. The album's art was shot by Mert and Marcus in London and styled by Carine Roitfeld. Giovanni Bianco, who collaborated with Madonna on her 2012 The MDNA Tour, artistic-directed the album. The Target exclusive edition cover of the album has a red background unlike the entirely black-and-white standard artwork.

== Music and lyrics ==
When putting the record together, Fergie was influenced by Amy Winehouse, Jhené Aiko, Ed Sheeran, Robert Plant, Guns N' Roses and old-school rap artists. Much like 2006's The Dutchess, Double Dutchess is a mainly pop album that tackles a wide spectrum of sounds, swinging from hip-hop, R&B influences to jazz, reggae vibes along with alternative '80s rock references. The singer further explained the mix and why she refused to stick just to one genre or to follow current musical trends: "The Dutchess was all over the place too. That album had all kinds of different styles, but the common thread was that they're all organic to me. I can't put out an album of just one style of music — of just what's 'on trend'. I would feel like a fraud." After giving birth to first son Axl Jack in August 2013, Fergie felt very motherly and casual, far from the tomboy-ish persona the public had come to know with the Black Eyed Peas and her first solo record. She credits Brazilian creative director Giovanni Bianco as being the one who helped her get back in touch with the artist she was back then, pushing her to "pulling that tough side of me back out."

"I'm pretty much the same crazy girl who has listened to N.W.A all her life. So I don't have any real new boundaries in that way [...] I do like to play with my sexuality. And I like to have a good time, and a lot of it is with a wink."

— Fergie talks about how experiencing motherhood influenced her songwriting with Billboard

Lyrically, the album touches on a variety of empowering, emotional and fun themes, such as motherhood, inner strength, relationships and her former meth addiction. In a Q&A interview for Entertainment Weekly, Fergie explained that "There was a lot of emotional stuff that I needed to clean out from inside me. I really opened my heart on this album. [...] I would go to these different producers and I'd have this stack of composition notebooks." Though she split from husband Josh Duhamel amidst the development process of the record and many songs have dramatic lyrics about love, Fergie insisted that the songs are "about many different relationships, some of them romantic, some of them not," going on to say "It's kind of like a photo album of the last few years of my life."

Fergie dedicated the song "Enchanté (Carine)" to Carine Roitfeld, whom she worked extensively with in the visuals for the record to approach a more sensual, softer side of herself. "She's a legend – she knows what she wants, she's very detail-orientated, which I love. [...] She would teach me these chic little things and talk about Brigitte Bardot and such. You can't help but be attracted to that and learn from it," she said about the homage. The singer brought home a demo of the song and as she was playing it, her son picked up on it and kept singing the French lyrics from the chorus. Fergie immediately started to follow him around with her phone secretly on recorder until she got a take that was decent and usable, and it ended up on the final version of the track.

In one of the lyrics for "A Little Work", the album's most powerful song as described by Fergie, she sings "I'm gonna rip it open and show the world what's there," as she explains: “It's not all pretty all the time. There are laughs, there's crying, there's anger, there's severe happiness, there's flirting, there's having fun. [The album] really encompasses the full me, and the full puzzle that makes up the misfit that I am, that doesn't fit into any one category."

Fergie described the writing sessions as a therapeutic process, saying: "I would just say that you need to have therapy somewhere, and be able to express your thoughts and feelings, and for me, it's with pen and paper, and it always has been, and I like the drama of it all, so I like to go into it and create the most dramatic way to express my feelings.”

== Singles ==
"L.A. Love (La La)" was released as the lead single on September 29, 2014. A remix of the song featuring Compton rapper YG was released a month later and was included on the album as the main version of the song, also being used in its video. It reached number twenty-seven on the US Billboard Hot 100. "M.I.L.F. $" was released as the second single from the album in July 2016. It reached number thirty-four on the Billboard Hot 100. "Life Goes On" was released in November that same year, reaching number thirty-nine on the US Mainstream Top 40. The album's fourth single, "You Already Know", featuring Nicki Minaj, was made available for purchase on August 25, 2017. It officially impacted contemporary hit and rhythmic radio on September 12, 2017. On October 24, 2017, Fergie performed "A Little Work" on The Talk, later on, the song was announced as the album's fifth North American single on Beats 1.

=== Promotional singles ===
"Hungry", featuring Rick Ross, was released as a promotional single on August 25, 2017. The song and its music video were used as teasers over a year leading up to the release of the album.

== Double Dutchess: Seeing Double ==
The visuals for the songs on the album were combined into one film titled Double Dutchess: Seeing Double that premiered exclusively at iPic Theaters throughout the United States, as a one-night only event, on September 20, 2017. The event included a previously recorded special Q&A featurette with Fergie totaling 100 minutes, and each ticket purchase also included an exclusive digital download of the album. The duration of Double Dutchess: Seeing Double itself is 62 minutes and 51 seconds. In Canada, the film premiered simultaneously on both Much and MTV on September 22, 2017.

The film features segments directed by Bruno Ilogti, Alek Keshishian, Rich Lee, Ben Mor, Chris Marrs Piliero, Fatima Robinson, Colin Tilley, Nina McNeely, Chris Ullens and Jonas Åkerlund. There are appearances from Jay Hernandez, Mark Vanderloo, Kendall Jenner and many other personalities. In the "Like It Ain't Nuttin'" visual, Fergie wears a dress by Dean and Dan Caten, from Dsquared2's 2015 collection. In "Save It Til Morning", she wears a shimmery bodycon dress by Tom Ford. In "Love is Pain", the singer's standing on a pedestal wearing a sheer Francesco Scognamiglio lace gown. Styling was done by Carine Roitfeld, guided by the artistic direction of Giovanni Bianco.

"Tension" has two videos, both directed by Fatima Robinson, the first video was released on Seeing Double but later removed from streaming services due to censorship, and a second video which has an appearance from Joanne the Scammer was uploaded to Fergie's Vevo account on October 4, 2017; it was later also added to the film as the first version was excluded.

"You Already Know" was not initially included in the iTunes film, although it was added later. Notably, it is still missing from the Apple Music version of the film.

== Critical reception ==
Professional ratings
Aggregate scores
Source	Rating
Metacritic	53/100
Review scores
Source	Rating
ABC News	3/5 stars
AllMusic	2.5/5 stars
The Guardian	3/5 stars
Slant Magazine	3/5 stars

Double Dutchess received generally mixed reviews from critics. At Metacritic, which assigns a normalized rating out of 100 to reviews from mainstream publications, the album received an average score of 53, based on four reviews. Allan Raible from ABC News stated in his review: "She's a shape shifter with a fun new album", adding: "On her own, Fergie remains a versatile, exciting performer, further establishing her growing clout as an entertainer. This record will have its detractors, but at the very least it provides a fun ride." Alexa Camp of Slant Magazine stated in her review: "Lyrically, the songs on the album rely heavily on braggadocious hip-hop tropes. 'M.I.L.F. $' is an aggro party track that finds Fergie splitting rapid-fire verses about the size of her bank account and her supposed ability to run the club. Conversely, tracks like 'Just Like You' and 'A Little Work' find a happy medium between hard and soft, with heavy beats, melodic pop hooks, and lyrics that aim to empower rather than boast. A handful of Caribbean-flavored songs, including the trap-house-infused 'Enchanté (Carine)' and the breezy 'Love Is Blind', further elevate Double Dutchess, lending a fresh, modern twist to what too often feels like an old game." In The Guardian's review, Tara Joshi stated: "Double Dutchess is fun and gloriously confident, cementing Fergie's place in pop royalty."

== Commercial performance ==
Double Dutchess debuted on the US Billboard 200 at number 19 with first-week sales of 21,000 units (16,000 in pure album sales) in the United States.

== Track listing ==
Standard edition
No.	Title	Writer(s)	Producer(s)	Length
1.	"Hungry" (featuring Rick Ross)	Stacy Ann Ferguson; Lisa Gerrard; Brendan Perry; William Roberts	Yonni; JP Did This; Donut^{[a]}; Fergie^{[b]}; Stevie Mackey^{[b]}; Venus Brown^{[c]}	3:23
2.	"Like It Ain't Nuttin'"	Ferguson; William Adams; Damien LeRoy; Kirk Robinson; Roy Hammond	will.i.am; DJ Ammo; Fergie^{[c]}; V. Brown^{[c]}	3:45
3.	"You Already Know" (featuring Nicki Minaj)	Ferguson; Adams; Onika Tanya Maraj; James Brown; Antonio Hardy	will.i.am; Fergie^{[c]}; V. Brown^{[c]}; Aubrey "Big Juice" Delaine^{[b]}; Joel Metzler^{[b]}	6:28
4.	"Just Like You"	Ferguson; Leon "Roccstar" Youngblood; Steve Franks; Taylor Parks	Youngblood; Mr. Franks; Fergie^{[c]}; V. Brown^{[c]}	3:52
5.	"A Little Work"	Ferguson; Lukasz Gottwald; Theron Thomas; Timothy Thomas; Henry Walter	Cirkut; Dr. Luke; Fergie^{[c]}; V. Brown^{[c]}	4:05
6.	"Life Goes On"	Ferguson; Toby Gad; Tristan Prettyman; Keith Harris; George Pajon, Jr.	Gad; Harris; Fergie^{[b]}	4:26
7.	"M.I.L.F. $"	Ferguson; Jamal Jones; Jocelyn Donald; Webster Gradney; Jeremy Allen; Torence Hatch; Melvin Vernell	Polow da Don; Fergie^{[b]}; Mackey^{[b]}; Blanco "The Ear"^{[c]}	2:42
8.	"Save It Til Morning"	Ferguson; Gad	Gad; Fergie^{[c]}; V. Brown^{[c]}	4:09
9.	"Enchanté (Carine)" (featuring Axl Jack)	Ferguson; Tal Meltzer; Philip Patterson; David Riff	Fixyn; Riff^{[a]}; Fergie^{[b]}; Mackey^{[b]}; V. Brown^{[b]}	4:27
10.	"Tension"	Ferguson; Justin Tranter; Diana Gordon; Alessandro Lindblad	Alesso; Fergie^{[b]}; V. Brown^{[b]}	3:23
11.	"L.A. Love (La La)" (featuring YG)	Ferguson; Dijon "DJ Mustard" McFarlane; Shomari Wilson; Royce Thomas; Thomas; Keenon Daequan Ray Jackson	McFarlane; Shonuff^{[d]}; Fergie^{[b]}	3:31
12.	"Love Is Blind"	Ferguson; Philip "DJ Hardwerk" Constable; Alvin Ranglin	Constable; Fergie^{[c]}	5:34
13.	"Love Is Pain"	Ferguson; Gad	Gad	7:09
Total length:				56:54

iTunes Store Deluxe Visual Experience edition (bonus video)
No.	Title	Length
14.	"Double Dutchess Deluxe Visual Experience"	62:51
Total length:		118:49

=== Notes ===
- Interludes produced by Terrace Martin and Venus Brown.
- ^{^[a]} indicates a co-producer
- ^{^[b]} indicates a vocal producer
- ^{^[c]} indicates an additional vocal producer
- ^{^[d]} indicates an additional producer

=== Sample credits ===
- "Hungry" contains excerpts from "Dawn of the Iconoclast", written by Lisa Gerrard and Brendan Perry and performed by Dead Can Dance.
- "Like It Ain't Nuttin" contains excerpts from "Top Billin'", written by Kirk Robinson and Roy Hammond and performed by Audio Two.
- "You Already Know" contains excerpts from "Think (About It)", written by James Brown and performed by Lyn Collins.
- "Love Is Blind" contains a sample of "Bam Bam", written and performed by Sister Nancy and co-written with Winston Riley.

== Charts ==
Chart performance for Double Dutchess
Chart (2017)	Peak position
Australian Albums (ARIA)	39
Belgian Albums (Ultratop Flanders)	120
Belgian Albums (Ultratop Wallonia)	94
Canadian Albums (Billboard)	23
Czech Albums (ČNS IFPI)	83
French Albums (SNEP)	175
German Albums (Offizielle Top 100)	65
Japan Hot Albums (Billboard Japan)	68
Japanese Albums (Oricon)	69
New Zealand Heatseeker Albums (RMNZ)	1
Scottish Albums (Official Charts)	48
Slovak Albums (IFPI)	89
Spanish Albums (Promusicae)	61
Swiss Albums (Schweizer Hitparade)	69
UK Albums (Official Charts)	49
UK Independent Albums (Official Charts)	14
UK R&B Albums (Official Charts)	1
US Billboard 200	19
US Independent Albums (Billboard)	4

== Release history ==
List of release dates, showing region, edition(s), format(s), record label(s) and reference(s)
Region	Date	Edition(s)	Format(s)	Label(s)	Ref.
Various	September 22, 2017	Standard; Deluxe Visual Experience	CD; digital download; streaming	Dutchess; Retrofuture; BMG	
Japan	October 18, 2017	Japanese	CD	Warner Music Japan	
United States	November 3, 2017	Standard	LP	Dutchess; Retrofuture; BMG	
