= M.I.L.F. $ =

Single by Fergie

from the album Double Dutchess
- Released: July 1, 2016
- Studio: Chalice Studios (Los Angeles, CA); The Village Recorder (Los Angeles, CA)
- Length: 2:42
- Label: will.i.am; Interscope
- Songwriters: Fergie Duhamel; Jamal Jones; Jocelyn Donald; Webster Gradney; Jeremy Allen; Torence Hatch; Melvin Vernell
- Producers: Polow da Don; Fergie Duhamel; Steve Mackey; Blanco "The Ear"

Fergie singles chronology
"L.A. Love (La La)" (2014)	"M.I.L.F. $" (2016)	"Life Goes On" (2016)

Music video
- "M.I.L.F. $" on YouTube

"M.I.L.F. $" (pronounced "MILF Money") is a song recorded by American singer Fergie for her second solo studio album, Double Dutchess (2017). It debuted at number 34 on the US Billboard Hot 100 with 65,000 in first-week sales.

== Composition ==
"This is definitely empowering moms to have fun. Being a mom and having a career, taking care of yourself and still being able to be flirty and fun and a little naughty sometimes - there's nothing wrong with that. Society tries to tell moms what they should and shouldn't be, and it's just a little freeing to have fun with pushing those limits a bit. I might do it a little bit more than others, but that's just who I am."

— Fergie talks about the meaning behind the track with Billboard

Fergie was inspired to write the song after the birth of her son, Axl Jack. About its double meaning, she stated "Changing the acronym ["MILF: Moms I'd Like to Fuck"] is about empowering women who do it all. They have a career, a family, and still find the time to take care of themselves and feel sexy. With a wink of course." In a radio interview on Zach Sang Show, Fergie said "I'm not running away from the fact that I am a mom [...] So I'm just gonna embrace it in a funny way," adding "What new mom doesn't want to be called a 'MILF' even though it feels wrong to say because originally what it stood for? Everybody's following somebody so why not just make it 'Moms I'd Like to Follow'."

== Critical reception ==
Alexa Camp from Slant Magazine compared the song favorably to her previous single, "L.A. Love (La La)", saying "'M.I.L.F. $' makes her previous effort sound like something you might hear on Lite FM."

== Music video ==
=== Background ===
The music video for "M.I.L.F. $" was conceptualized by Fergie and filmed with director Colin Tilley in Los Angeles. Set in a stereotypical 1950s candy-colored town called "Milfville" albeit with modern vehicles, it features Fergie with a group of famous mothers, including Ciara, Chrissy Teigen, Alessandra Ambrosio, Kim Kardashian, Gemma Ward, Devon Aoki, Angela Lindvall, Isabeli Fontana, Amber Valletta, and Natasha Poly as the lingerie-clad housewives.

Later in the video, Fergie is shown waitressing at a soda shop, teaching a classroom full of rowdy, letterman jacket-wearing teens, and taking a bath in a tub filled with milk. (Specifically, she wears a body-briefer and rests on her belly, half-submerged in the milk.) The video ends with several mothers each shooting their own "Got Milf?" ads. Male models Jon Kortajarena and Jordan Barrett appear as a milkman and a bartender, respectively. Ambrosio's daughter Anja and Teigen's daughter Luna make appearances.

The video premiered online on Vevo on July 1, 2016. As of July 2023, the video has reached over 326 million views on YouTube.

=== Filming ===
Teigen's daughter, Luna, was three weeks old when the video was filmed, so the crew took extra efforts to be considerate on set. According to Teigen, the set was closed, the air conditioning was turned off and people were cleared out. Teigen was accompanied by her husband John Legend on set.

=== Fashion ===
To prepare for the video, Swedish stylist B. Åkerlund planned for about two weeks, then took two more weeks to assemble the cast and select their clothing and accessories. Teigen wore an outfit from Moschino Couture while shooting her breastfeeding scene. For the milk shower scene, Kardashian wore a custom-made layered nude body suit from designer Atsuko Kudo to give an illusion of her being naked, while Fergie wore a yellow crop top that references the original album cover of Bon Jovi's Slippery When Wet.

== Formats and track listings ==
Digital download
No.	Title	Length
1.	"M.I.L.F $"	2:42

In addition to the single track as a digital download, a remix EP was released.

Digital download (remixes)
No.	Title	Length
1.	"M.I.L.F. $" (Dave Audé remix)	3:26
2.	"M.I.L.F. $" (Polow da Don remix)	2:53
3.	"M.I.L.F. $" (Slushii remix)	3:23
4.	"M.I.L.F. $" (Nick Talos remix)	2:39
5.	"M.I.L.F. $" (Suspect 44 remix)	3:44
6.	"M.I.L.F. $" (Jodie Harsh remix)	3:07

== Charts ==
Chart performance for "M.I.L.F. $"
Chart (2016)	Peak position
Australia (ARIA)	26
Canada Hot 100 (Billboard)	28
France (SNEP)	89
Germany (GfK)	89
Hungary (Single Top 40)	22
Ireland (IRMA)	78
Netherlands (Dutch Top 40 Tipparade)	21
Portugal (AFP)	95
Scottish Singles Sales (Official Charts)	28
UK Singles (Official Charts)	56
US Billboard Hot 100	34
US Hot Rap Songs (Billboard)	7

== Certifications ==
Region	Certification	Certified units/sales
Brazil (Pro-Música Brasil)	Gold	20,000^{‡}
United States (RIAA)	Gold	500,000^{‡}
^{‡} Sales+streaming figures based on certification alone.

== Release history ==
Release dates and formats for "M.I.L.F. $"
Region	Date	Format	Version	Label	Ref.
Various	July 1, 2016	Digital download	Original	Interscope; will.i.am	
Italy	July 8, 2016	Radio airplay	Original	Universal	
Various	September 16, 2016	Digital download	Remixes	Interscope; will.i.am	
