= Fergie (singer) =

American singer and songwriter (born 1975)

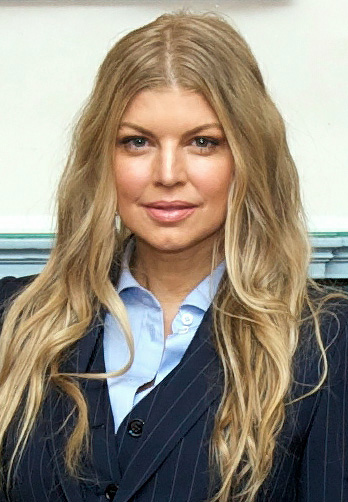
- Fergie in 2014
- Born: Stacy Ann Ferguson; March 27, 1975 (age 51); Hacienda Heights, California, U.S. (Note: The confusion of whether she was born in Whittier or Hacienda Heights may be due to the local hospital being located in Whittier. However, the Whittier Daily News says she was born in Hacienda Heights.)
- Other name: Fergie Duhamel (Note: Up until 2019.)
- Occupations: Singer; songwriter; actress; businesswoman
- Years active: 1984–present
- Works: Discography
- Spouse: Josh Duhamel (m. 2009; div. 2019)
- Children: 1
- Awards: Full list
- Musical career
- Genres: Pop; R&B; hip-hop
- Instrument: Vocals
- Labels: RCA; will.i.am; Interscope; BMG; Dutchess Music
- Formerly of: Wild Orchid; Black Eyed Peas
- Website: fergie.com

Stacy Ann "Fergie" Ferguson (/ˈfɜːrɡi/ FUR-ghee; born March 27, 1975) is an American singer, songwriter, actress, and businesswoman. After earning recognition as a child actress in the 1980s, Fergie achieved international fame as a member of the Black Eyed Peas from 2002 to 2018. During her tenure with the group, she also achieved success with her solo career, film and television appearances, and business ventures.

As a child, Fergie starred on the children's television series Kids Incorporated from 1984 to 1989, and voiced Sally Brown in two Peanuts television specials and in The Charlie Brown and Snoopy Show (1984–1986). She later co-founded the girl group Wild Orchid, performing on two of the group's albums. Fergie then joined the Black Eyed Peas in 2002, from which she achieved her commercial breakthrough and with whom she recorded four albums. Her debut solo album, The Dutchess (2006), peaked at number two on the US Billboard 200 and spawned the Billboard Hot 100 number-one singles "Big Girls Don't Cry", "Glamorous" and "London Bridge", as well as the top-five singles "Clumsy" and "Fergalicious". Her second solo album, Double Dutchess (2017)—accompanied by a namesake film subtitled Seeing Double—peaked at number 19 on the Billboard 200 and spawned the top 40 singles "L.A. Love (La La)" and "M.I.L.F. $".

Fergie continued acting into the 2000s, appearing in the disaster film Poseidon (2006), the double feature Grindhouse (2007), the musical drama Nine (2009), and the comedy film Marmaduke (2010). She also pursued other ventures, releasing the fragrance Outspoken with Avon Products in 2010, and launching four other fragrances and two footwear lines. She began hosting the reality series The Four: Battle for Stardom in 2018.

Fergie has sold over 30 million records within the United States alone, and her accolades include eight Grammy Awards and a Screen Actors Guild Award nomination. Billboard named her Woman of the Year in 2010, and ranked her among the top female artists of the 2000s decade and the 21st century.

== Early life, family and education ==
Stacy Ann Ferguson was born on March 27, 1975, in Hacienda Heights, California, a suburb of Los Angeles. Her parents are Terri (née Gore) and Jon Patrick Ferguson. She has a younger sister named Dana Ferguson; their ancestry includes English, Irish, Mexican, and Scottish. Ferguson was raised Catholic.

She attended Mesa Robles Middle School and Glen A. Wilson High School. She was a cheerleader, straight-A student, spelling bee champion, and Girl Scout.

== Career ==
=== 1984–2001: Early acting and Wild Orchid ===
Fergie studied dance and began providing voiceovers. She was the voice for Charlie Brown's sister Sally in two made-for-television Peanuts cartoons, It's Flashbeagle, Charlie Brown (1984) and Snoopy's Getting Married, Charlie Brown (1985), as well as on four episodes of The Charlie Brown and Snoopy Show.

From 1984 to 1989, Fergie starred on the TV show Kids Incorporated and was the longest running cast member. She starred in the first six of the show's nine seasons.

Additionally, she was a member of the female trio Wild Orchid, which she fronted with Stefanie Ridel and fellow Kids Incorporated star Renee Sandstrom. By 1992, the girls began meeting with record labels, but they could not get a recording contract. They eventually signed a music publishing deal with Sony Publishing before signing a record contract with RCA Records in 1994.

Wild Orchid released their self-titled debut album in March 1997, which charted at No. 153 on the Billboard 200. In September 1998, they released their second album, Oxygen, which was a commercial failure, only selling 200,000 copies worldwide. From June 16 to August 28, 1999, they opened for Cher's Do You Believe? tour alongside Cyndi Lauper, which took them to 52 cities across the US and Canada. They completed a third album, which their record label declined to release, and Fergie left the group in September 2001. In 2006, Fergie told Entertainment Weekly that both frustrations with the band's image and personal drug problems led her to leave Wild Orchid.

=== 2002–2005: Breakthrough with the Black Eyed Peas ===
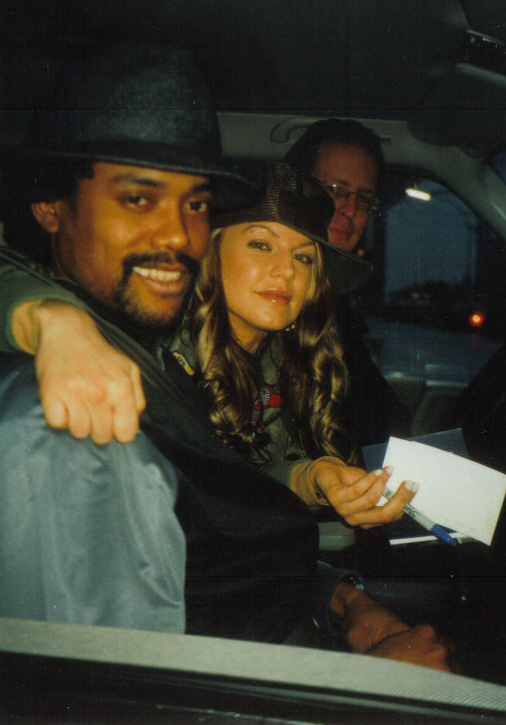
Fergie with apl.de.ap of the Black Eyed Peas in 2005

The Black Eyed Peas were recording their third album, Elephunk (2003), when A&R Music Coordinator Dante Santiago asked will.i.am to invite Fergie to try out for the song "Shut Up". She secured the gig and instantly bonded with the trio, going on to record five additional songs on the album. The following spring, shortly before Elephunk came out, Interscope Records chairman Jimmy Iovine offered Fergie a permanent spot to take over vocal duties and fill the void left by background singer Kim Hill's departure in 2000. In a positive review of the Black Eyed Peas' newfound style, Rolling Stone noted that since 2002, when the group "hired a blond bombshell named Stacy 'Fergie' Ferguson and gave up their pursuit of backpack-rapper cred, they have made a kind of spiritual practice of recording futuristic songs — a total aesthetic commitment that extends from their garish wardrobes to their United Colors of Benetton worldview." From Elephunk came "Where Is the Love?", which became the Black Eyed Peas' first major hit: it peaked at number eight on the Billboard Hot 100 and topped the charts in several other countries. The album subsequently spawned "Shut Up", which topped the charts in many markets. The third single from the album, "Hey Mama", reached the top 10 in several European countries and later peaked at number twenty-three in the United States in 2004.

Their next album, Monkey Business, was released on June 7, 2005; it debuted at number two on the US Billboard 200 albums chart. The album sold over 295,000 copies in its first week; it was later certified triple platinum by the Recording Industry Association of America (RIAA). Their next and last commercially released single from the album was "Pump It", which borrows much of its sound from "Misirlou", specifically Dick Dale's version; it peaked at number 8 in Australia and 18 in America. The album's first single, "Don't Phunk with My Heart", was a hit in the United States, reaching number three on the U.S. Hot 100 and earned them another Grammy for Best Rap Performance by a Duo or Group. "Don't Lie", the second single from the album, saw success on the U.S. Hot 100, reaching No. 14, although becoming somewhat more successful in the UK and Australia, reaching a peak of No.6 in both countries. "My Humps", another song from the album, immediately achieved commercial success in the US and fairly substantial radio play despite the sexually suggestive lyrics, reaching number three on the U.S. Hot 100 and number one in Australia, making it their fourth Australian number one single. However, many mocked the song for its lyrics. John Bush, writing for AllMusic, described it as "one of the most embarrassing rap performances of the new millennium". Later in 2005, the Black Eyed Peas toured with Gwen Stefani as a supporting act. In December 2005, they embarked on the "European Tour". In March 2006, the Black Eyed Peas toured again, as the featured headliner for the Honda Civic Tour.

=== 2006–2008: The Dutchess and expansion ===
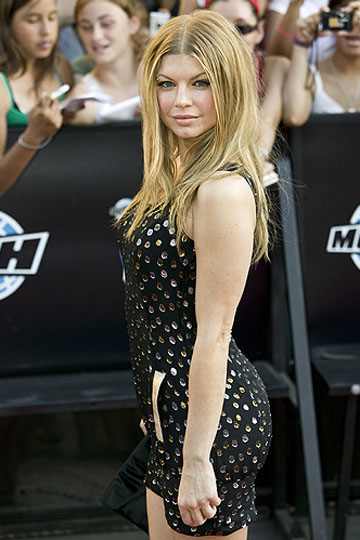
Fergie at the 2007 MuchMusic Video Awards

Fergie's debut solo album, The Dutchess, was released in September 2006. It was initially recorded in 2005. The songs on the album are "from a seven-year period, but [Interscope CEO] Jimmy Iovine heard some [tracks] and was like, 'This is great, let's put it out'. One of the album's executive producers and fellow Black Eyed Peas member will.i.am stated that she was "writing about her personal struggles and casting her demons away and feminine power. [It's] her singing for young girls to be strong, and what they're going through in life, just growing up in this world of uncertainty." "London Bridge" was released as the album's lead single on July 18, 2006, to radio stations and on August 7, 2006, on the iTunes Store. The urban pop track caused controversy due to its double entendre title. It became a huge success, topping the Billboard Hot 100 (for three weeks) and New Zealand charts, while also reaching the top-ten in over twelve countries. The music video for the song features the Black Eyed Peas members as well as Fergie on the Tower Bridge, among other scenes.

The following single, "Fergalicious", was released on October 23, 2006. The track, which features will.i.am, reached number two on the Billboard Hot 100, the top-five in Australia and New Zealand, although it peaked lower than "London Bridge" in Europe. Its music video features Fergie as Willy Wonka in a candy factory. "Glamorous" was released as the third single from the album, on February 20, 2007. The track, which features Ludacris, became another number-one single for Fergie in the United States, and also reached the top-ten in over seven countries. The fourth single, "Big Girls Don't Cry", was released on May 22, 2007. The ballad became a worldwide hit, topping the charts of ten countries, including Australia, Canada and the US; it was also the album's most successful single in Europe. It earned Fergie a nomination for the Grammy Award for Best Female Pop Vocal Performance. The music video for the song features American actor Milo Ventimiglia as her love interest. "Clumsy" was the fifth and final single from the album. It was released on September 25, 2007 and became a top-ten hit in five countries, including in Australia and the US, becoming her fifth consecutive top-five hit in the US.

In 2007, the Black Eyed Peas embarked on the Black Blue & You World Tour and visited more than 20 countries. Fergie returned to acting in 2006, appearing as a lounge singer in the Poseidon remake. She later had supporting roles in 2007's Grindhouse and the 2009 musical film Nine. Fergie and other members of the cast of Nine won the Satellite Award for Best Cast – Motion Picture and received nominations for the Critics' Choice Movie Award for Best Acting Ensemble and Screen Actors Guild Award for Outstanding Performance by a Cast in a Motion Picture for their performances. On December 31, 2006, Fergie began hosting Dick Clark's New Year's Rockin' Eve on ABC for the pre-taped Hollywood segments after the New Year Ball came down in Times Square in New York City.

=== 2009–2012: Continued success with the Black Eyed Peas ===
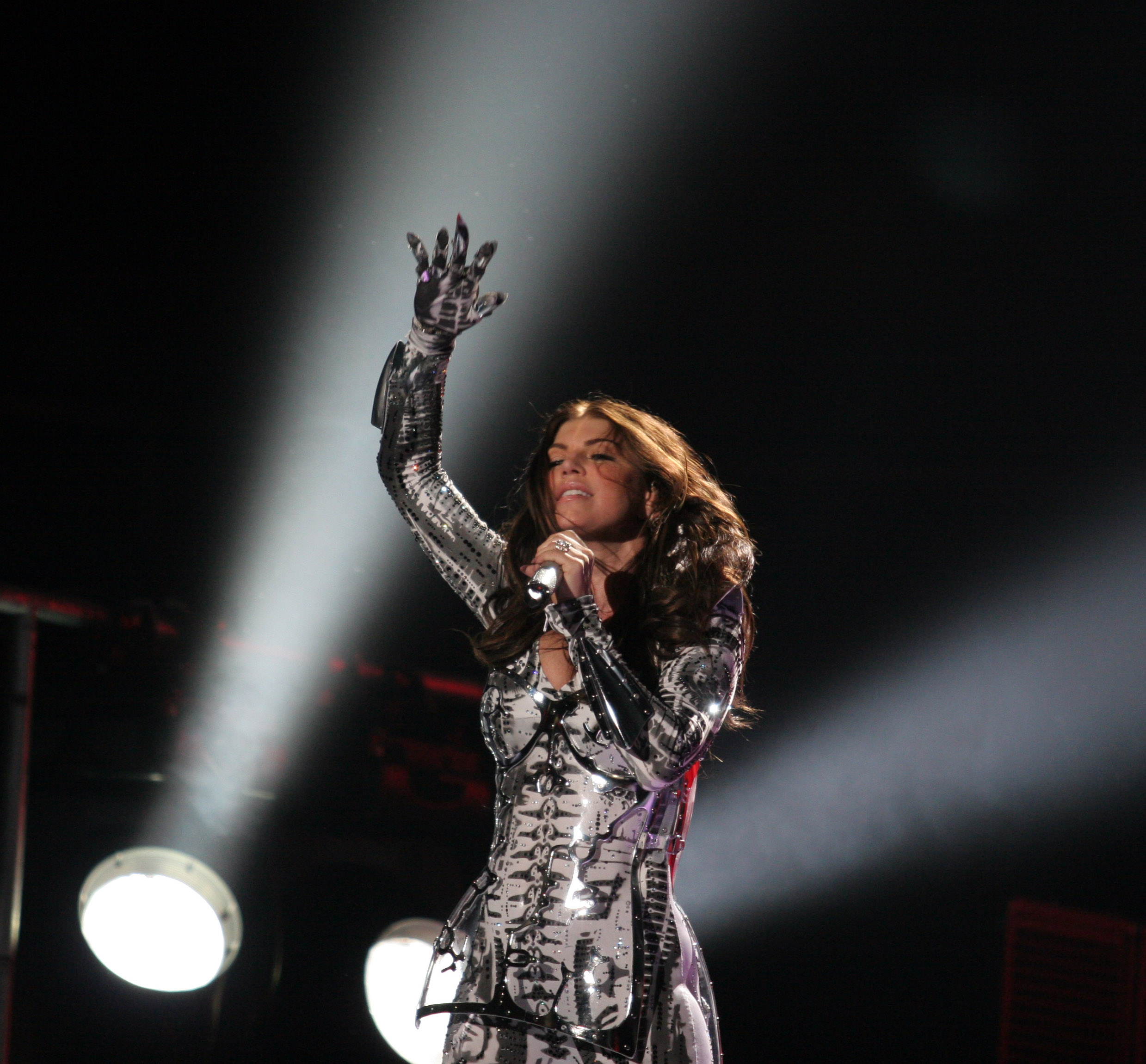
Fergie performing at Jacksonville Veterans Memorial Arena, 2010

In early 2009, Fergie and the group left A&M Records; both remained with Interscope Records. The group's fifth studio album, The E.N.D ("The Energy Never Dies"), was released on June 9, 2009. The overall sound of the album has a more electro hop beat rather than the usual hip pop/R&B feeling of their previous albums. In its first week, the album sold 304,000 copies and debuted at number 1 on the Billboard 200. They released "Boom Boom Pow" as the lead single from The E.N.D. in March 2009. It reached number one on the US charts and became the group's first chart topper. As of March 2011, the album has sold over 3,000,000 copies in the US alone. In France, the album spent 55 weeks inside of the top 10 with 11 at No. 1. They subsequently released a second single from the album, "I Gotta Feeling", which proved an even greater success than the first: it moved from number two behind "Boom Boom Pow" to the top spot in July, and stayed for 14 straight weeks at number one on the Billboard Hot 100, the longest stay at the top of 2009. The two hit singles back to back kept the Black Eyed Peas on the top for 26 consecutive weeks, from April 18 through October 16. Fergie bought a stake in the professional football team the Miami Dolphins in 2009, and has performed at the team's football games numerous times.

"Meet Me Halfway" was released as the third single from the album in September 2009. The single reached number one in the UK and Australia. It also peaked at seven on the Billboard Hot 100. In October 2009, Fergie became a part owner of the Miami Dolphins. "Imma Be" was released as the fourth single; it reached number one on the Billboard Hot 100 for two weeks. "Rock That Body" was then released as the fifth single and reached number nine on the US charts. In September 2009, the group embarked on The E.N.D World Tour, visiting Japan, Thailand, Malaysia, Australia and New Zealand. In October 2009, they also were the opening acts for 5 concerts of the U2 360° Tour North America leg.

The Black Eyed Peas performed at the 2010 Grammy Awards on January 31, 2010. They performed a mash-up of "Imma Be"/"I Gotta Feeling". They won three out of the six awards they were nominated for; they won awards for Best Pop Vocal Album for The E.N.D., Best Pop Vocal Performance by a Group for "I Gotta Feeling" and Best Short Form Video for "Boom Boom Pow". On July 27, 2010, the Black Eyed Peas released a remix album: The E.N.D. Summer 2010 Canadian Invasion Tour: Remix Collection. It was released on iTunes in Canada only, during the Canadian leg of The E.N.D. World Tour. It mostly features remixes of the singles taken from The E.N.D. It also features a remix of "Let's Get It Started" taken from Elephunk; the remix was also a bonus track on the deluxe edition of The E.N.D.. She launched her debut fragrance, Outspoken, under Avon in May 2010. Her performance of Gimme Shelter with Mick Jagger and U2 at the Rock and Roll Hall of Fame 25th Anniversary in 2010 has over 13 million views.

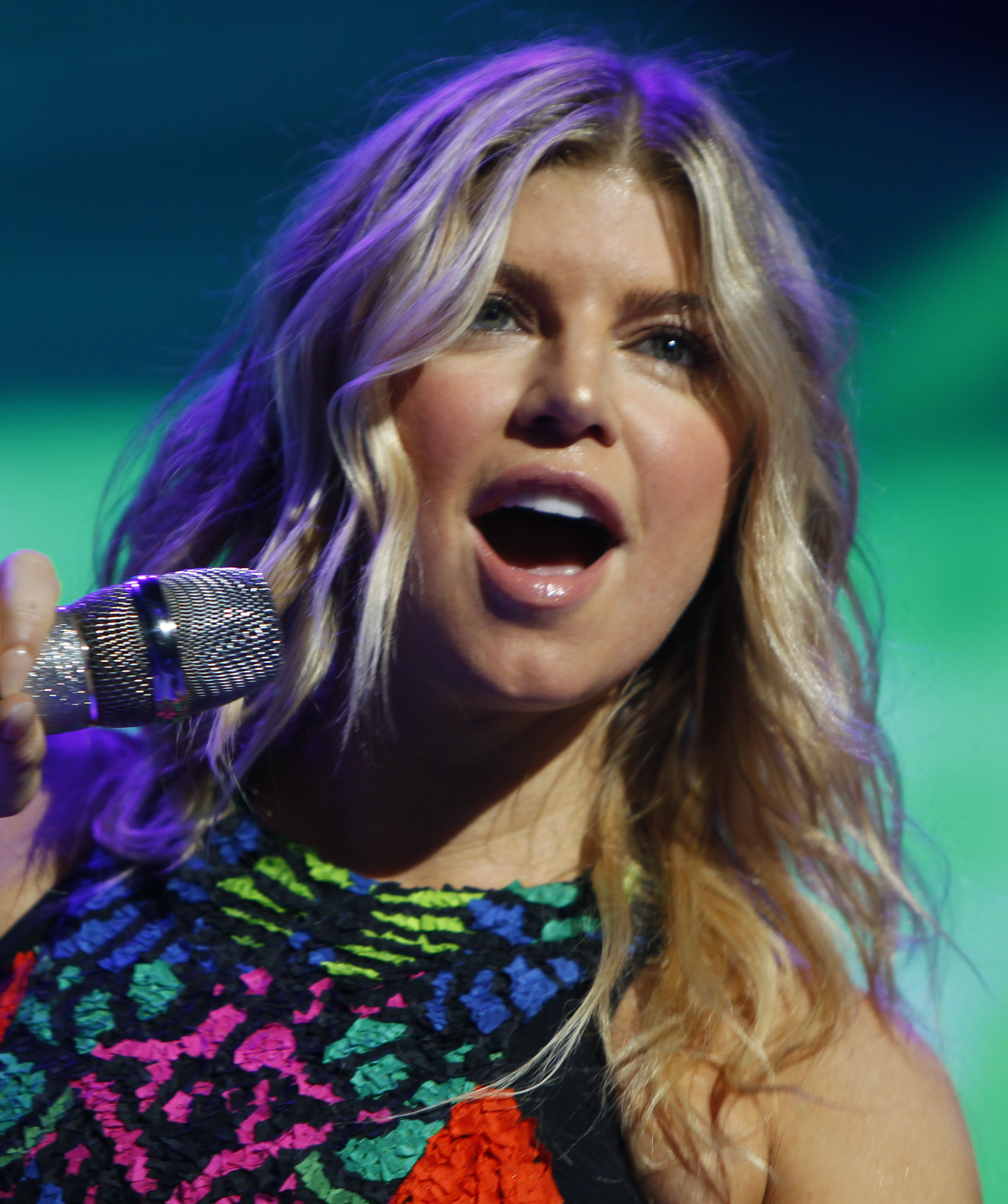
Fergie performing during Walmart Shareholders' Meeting in 2011

Their sixth studio album, The Beginning, was released on November 30, 2010, and received mixed reviews. The album's first single release was called "The Time (Dirty Bit)". In January 2011, she began appearing in commercials for the soda pop, Dr Pepper Cherry. "Just Can't Get Enough", the album's second single, was released on February 18, 2011. The music video was released on March 16, 2011, and it was filmed in Tokyo, one week before the earthquake and the tsunami. The video was directed by Ben Mor. The group's third single was "Don't Stop the Party" and it was released on May 10, 2011. On the same day, a music video for the song was released on iTunes, along with the single. The video, directed by Ben Mor, features on stage and backstage footage of the group during The E.N.D. World Tour in 2009–10. The video premiered on Vevo on May 12, 2011. On May 22, the group appeared on the 2011 Billboard Music Awards and won 1 of their 4 nominations, for "Top Duo/Group". On the July 6, 2011 during a concert at Alton Towers in Staffordshire, the Black Eyed Peas announced they are taking an indefinite hiatus following the completion of their current tour, as they did between 2005 and 2009. On September 22, Fergie visited Madame Tussauds for the unveiling of her wax figure in Las Vegas, Nevada. In 2012, she became the owner and celebrity partner for Voli Light Vodkas, a low-calorie vodka with natural flavors.

=== 2013–2017: Double Dutchess ===
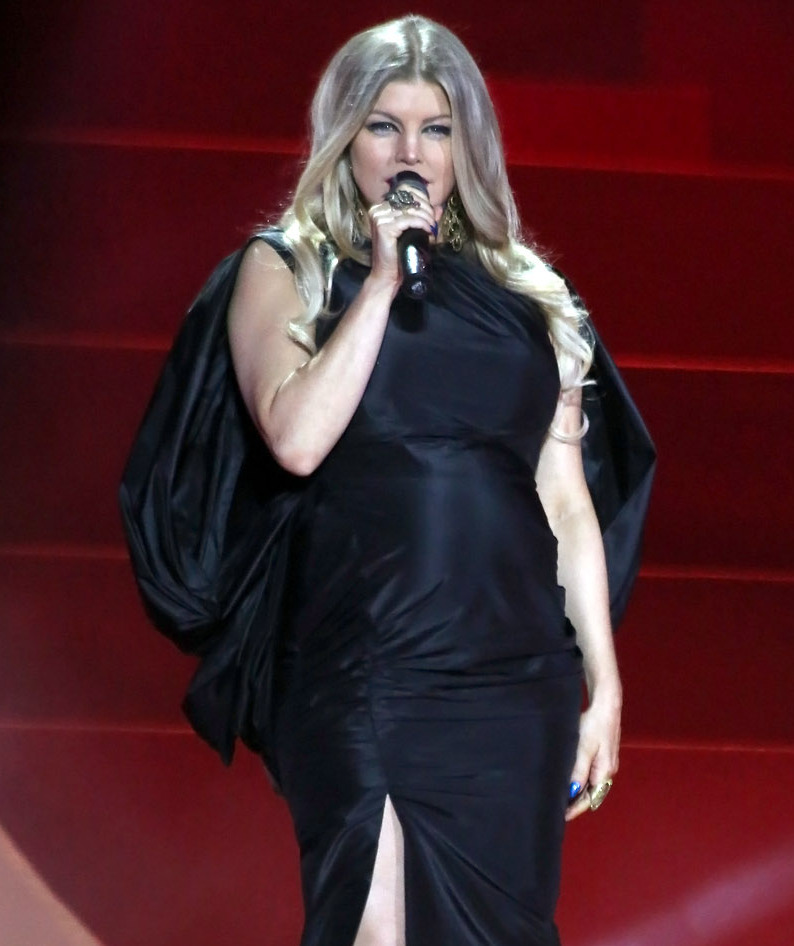
Fergie at the 2013 Life Ball Vienna

In 2013, Fergie announced that she had begun writing her second solo studio album. The same year, Fergie filed a claim at the Los Angeles County Superior Court to legally change her name to Fergie Duhamel and take the last name of her husband, Josh Duhamel. On January 6, 2014, it was announced, again, that Fergie was beginning the process of her second studio album. She stated in an interview with radio host Ryan Seacrest that will.i.am would be handling the production, with a release through Interscope. Later that year with Billboard, she revealed that her experiences with motherhood influenced her songwriting. In September 2014, it was announced that Fergie's second studio album had been slated for a 2015 release. Her single, "L.A. Love (La La)", was released to contemporary hit radio on September 30, 2014. The song debuted on the Billboard Hot 100 at number 97 and peaked at number 27. It also reached number 16 on the Rhythmic Songs, number eight on Hot Rap Songs, number 24 on the Digital Songs and number 20 on the Pop Songs radio chart.

On April 22, 2015, the singer performed a song with the Black Eyed Peas at the 2015 Coachella Valley Music and Arts Festival as part of David Guetta's set. Fergie announced in June 2015 that she was putting the finishing touches on her second album, Double Dutchess. A teaser for the album titled "Hungry (1st Byte)" was released on June 9, 2016. On July 1, she released a new single, titled "M.I.L.F. $". Fergie was inspired to write the song after the birth of her son, Axl. The music video was conceptualized by Fergie and features a group of famous mothers as lingerie-clad 1950s housewives. On November 11, 2016, Fergie released the album's third single, "Life Goes On". In November 2016, during a live Facebook chat, Fergie confirmed that the album would see its release in 2017.

In May 2017, it was announced that Fergie had parted ways—by mutual decision—with Interscope and would launch her own imprint, Dutchess Music, as part of a global partnership with BMG Rights Management. On June 2, 2017, a Billboard article rumored that Fergie was departing from the Black Eyed Peas. Band frontman will.i.am dismissed this, but stated that Fergie was taking a break from the group opting to concentrate on her solo career whilst the remaining members are working on a side project. The pre-order of Double Dutchess was made available on August 25, 2017, along with instant downloads of "Hungry" and "You Already Know", collaborations with Rick Ross and Nicki Minaj respectively, with the latter being the fourth single from the album. On September 16, 2017, Fergie performed a solo set live from the Rock in Rio stage in Rio de Janeiro for over a hundred thousand people with surprise guests Pabllo Vittar, Sergio Mendes and Gracinha Leporace. On September 20, 2017, a film, Double Dutchess: Seeing Double, was released as a one-night only event. Double Dutchess was finally released on September 22, 2017; on that same day, Double Dutchess: Seeing Double was screened in Canada. The album debuted on the US Billboard 200 at number 19, with first-week sales of 21,000 units in the United States.

=== 2018–present: Television and hiatus ===
On February 18, 2018, will.i.am confirmed Fergie's departure from the band in an interview with the Daily Star. That same day, at the 2018 NBA All-Star Game, Fergie performed a controversial rendition of "The Star-Spangled Banner"; People described it as a "slowed-down jazzy rendition" and Deadline reported it as being "bluesy" and "breathy". She would later acknowledge that "clearly this rendition didn't strike the intended tone." Also in 2018, Fergie hosted the singing competition series The Four: Battle for Stardom, which ran for two seasons on Fox. In September 2018, Fergie re-recorded The Wendy Williams Show's theme song "Feel It" to celebrate the show's 10th season.

In May 2019, Fergie competed against actress Octavia Spencer on VH1's variety show Martha & Snoop's Potluck Dinner Party. Spencer and Fergie competed on who can make the best brunch spread for Mother's Day. Variety reported that after Jack Harlow's sampling of "Glamorous" for "First Class", her song had a 70% increase in streams and 125% increase in digital song sales. Fergie and Harlow opened the 2022 MTV Video Music Awards with a live performance of "First Class", which marked her first televised performance in four years. The New York Post called it one of the best performances of the night.

In January 2025, Fergie played a teacher in the music video for "Trippin" by Sturdyyoungin, which samples her song "Clumsy". In July 2025, Fergie filmed a second "London Bridge" music video for the Netflix drama series Too Much, which takes place at its titular location; the original took place at Tower Bridge. Fergie said that, despite being on hiatus, "I loved this idea, and I loved—especially at this time in my life—just being a little bit messier, a little bit goofier, and just having fun with life." Also appearing in the video are Megan Stalter and other cast members of Too Much. In October 2025, Fergie joined Ludacris at a show in Atlanta to perform "Glamorous".

== Other ventures ==
=== Business ===
In 2007, Fergie launched two handbag collections for Kipling. In 2008, she signed a deal with Brown Shoe to create a licensed footwear brand. In 2010, Fergie launched her first fragrance, Outspoken by Fergie, under direct selling beauty and cosmetics company, Avon and release more fragrances in her Outspoken line, including Outspoken Intense in 2011, Viva by Fergie in 2012, Outspoken Fresh in 2013 and Outspoken Party! in 2015. Her tagline to her fragrance line is "Say What You Mean It".

In 2012, Fergie released a 24-piece nail polish collection with the Wet 'n' Wild. She debuted her cosmetics line for Wet 'n' Wild in 2013, consisting of numerous make-up products such as lip gloss, primer, lipstick, eyeliner and mascara. In 2019, Fergie visited Toronto, Ontario, Canada to promote her two footwear lines, Fergalicious by Fergie and Fergie Footwear, which became available at Canadian luxury goods department store Hudson's Bay in 2015. Fergie Footwear is an upscale line, sold at luxury department such as Nordstrom, while Fergalicious by Fergie is sold at lower prices at outlets such as Famous Footwear stores.

In 2020, Fergie and her father Pat Ferguson's winery Ferguson Crest, which was founded in 2006, released three new wines called 2012 Syrah, 2012 Fergalicious and 2013 Viognier. The wines were named after song lyrics by Fergie and the Black Eyed Peas. In 2023, Architectural Digest reported that she sold the vineyard property in Solvang, California for $3.7 million.

List of product lines by Fergie
Year	Name	Brand	Notes
2007–2008	"Fergie for Kipling"	Kipling	Handbag collection
2009–present	"Fergalicious by Fergie"	Brown Shoe Company	Footwear line
2009–present	"Fergie Footwear"	Brown Shoe Company	Footwear line
2012	"Fergie by Wet 'n' Wild"	Wet 'n' Wild	Nail color collection
2013–2016	"The Fergie CenterStage Collection"	Wet 'n' Wild	Cosmetics line

=== Modeling ===
Fergie has been featured on the cover of numerous lifestyle and fashion magazines such as Marie Claire, Paper, Harper's Bazaar, Cosmopolitan, Lucky, Cleo, Elle, Glamour, Allure, Shape and Seventeen. She has appeared in ad campaigns for Voli, MAC Cosmetics' Viva Glam, C&A Mexico, Candie's and Philipp Plein. She has appeared in commercials for Case-Mate, Motorola Rokr U9, Pepsi, Hewlett-Packard, Dr Pepper and Doritos.

Fergie was signed to Wilhelmina Models from 2007 to 2011. Through Wilhelmina Models, she worked with brands such as Dsquared, Calvin Klein and Marchesa. In 2010, she became a spokesperson for Avon's haircare line Advanced Techniques, appearing in advertisements and commercials for the brand. In 2012, Fergie became a global beauty ambassador for Wet 'n' Wild.

=== Philanthropy ===
Fergie has supported charity organizations such as Habitat For Humanity, Lopez Family Foundation, Red Cross, Stand Up To Cancer, The Trevor Project and Treatment Action Campaign. In April 2011, Fergie and the Black Eyed Peas teamed up with children's clothing brand P.S. from Aeropostale to design a charity T-shirt that will benefit the band's Peapod Foundation.

In April 2013, Fergie received the "Always Next, Forever Now" award from Logo TV in recognition of her work in the LGBT community. On March 20, 2014, as Avon Foundation's global brand ambassador, Fergie announced the launch of a new global initiative, the Justice Institute on Gender-Based Violence, with Avon Foundation, Vital Voices, and the U.S. Department of State in Washington, D.C. The public-private initiative aims to improve the enforcement of laws around the globe protecting victims of domestic and gender violence.

In 2020, 100 percent of the proceeds from Fergie Footwear's holiday shoe were donated to Dress For Success, a global nonprofit organization that provides professional attire for low-income women.

== Artistry and media image ==
Fergie does not consider herself a rapper. In a 2006 interview with Rolling Stone, Fergie said of her vocal style: "I love imitating instruments, sometimes you can't understand what I'm saying because I'm going for an instrumental sound. It would ruin the sound if I pronunciated [sic] correctly." She cites Selena as her first influence. Roxanne Shante, Monie Love, Salt-N-Pepa, and J. J. Fad are artists she looks up to, and The Dutchess pays homage to them. In an interview with Entertainment Tonight, she said Beyoncé was a major influence for her album Double Dutchess. Other influences for her sophomore record are Amy Winehouse, Jhené Aiko, Ed Sheeran, Robert Plant, and Guns N' Roses.

Fergie has received attention for her work with the Black Eyed Peas and for her solo music. Leah Greenblatt of Entertainment Weekly said that, with The Dutchess, "she's earned her Black Eyed independence – and perhaps even her new royal title." Retrospectively, Jason Lipshutz of Billboard called Fergie "a fearlessly individual female artist that had been hiding in plain sight. [...] Fergie deserves retroactive praise for an uncompromising first look". With the release of Double Dutchess, Allan Raible of ABC News wrote: "On her own, Fergie remains a versatile, exciting performer, further establishing her growing clout as an entertainer." Tara Joshi of The Guardian agreed, deeming Fergie "pop royalty".

In a retrospective Paper article analyzing her image, Katherine Gillespie called her an "imperfect popstar" who "managed to rise above these manufactured circumstances and establish a unique onstage persona that relied on fashion just as much as music to get its point across. [...] She featured in Worst Dressed columns, but also inspired millions of 14-year-olds to spend their allowances on cargo pants. That's real influence."

Artists who have been influenced by Fergie include Ariana Grande, Jack Harlow, Alessia Cara and Ava Max. Harlow's Billboard Hot 100 number one song "First Class", released in April 2022, samples Fergie's song "Glamorous".

== Achievements ==
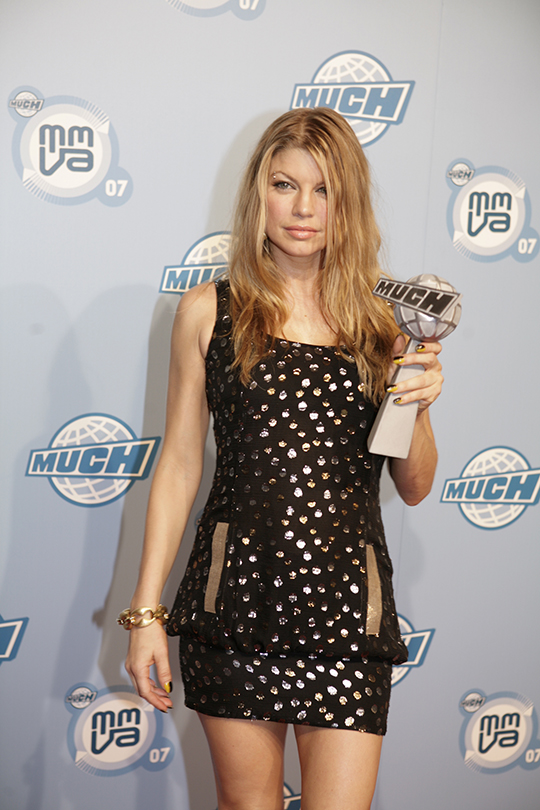
Fergie after winning the MuchMusic Video Award for Best International Video ("Fergalicious") in 2007

As a solo artist, Fergie has sold over 7.2 million albums and 29 million singles worldwide. According to the Recording Industry Association of America (RIAA), she has sold 27.5 million albums and singles in the United States. With her debut album The Dutchess, she became the first singer to have five singles from a debut album peak within the top five of the Billboard Hot 100 since Milli Vanilli's Girl You Know It's True (1989). With those singles selling over two million digital downloads individually in the United States, she set a record in the digital era for the most multi-platinum singles from one album, which she held until 2012. She is the second female to achieve three Billboard Hot 100 topping singles from one album in the 21st century, the first being Christina Aguilera. In 2006, her single "London Bridge" had the second fastest ascent in Hot 100 history at the time; it peaked at the top in three weeks.

Fergie has been nominated for five Brit Awards with the Black Eyed Peas. She has been nominated for twenty Grammy Awards, of which she has won eight: Best Rap Performance by a Duo or Group in 2005 and 2006; Best Pop Performance by a Duo or Group with Vocals in 2007; Best Pop Performance by a Duo or Group with Vocals, Best Pop Vocal Album, and Best Music Video in 2010; and Best Rap/Sung Collaboration and Best Rap Song in 2012. Blender named Fergie their woman of the year in 2007. Billboard named Fergie Woman of the Year in 2010; the same publication ranked her 16th on the 2000s Top Female Artists of the Decade list, and 28th on their Top Women Artists of the 21st Century list.

== Personal life ==
Fergie is bisexual. She said "I've been in show business since I was a little girl, so [homosexuality] was always very normal to me. My mom taught me that every human is God's child. You have to live your own life and not judge other people. Love is a great thing."

While performing with Wild Orchid, Fergie developed an addiction to crystal methamphetamine, which continued after her departure from the group in 2001. In September 2006, she called crystal "the hardest boyfriend I ever had to break up with". Fergie also stated "It's the drug that's addicting. But it's why you start doing it in the first place that's interesting. A lot of it was being a child actor; I learned to suppress feelings." She has stated in several interviews that she is an avid user of hypnotherapy, which she used to overcome her crystal meth addiction and to relax.

Fergie began dating actor Josh Duhamel in September 2004, after she met him when she and the Black Eyed Peas filmed a cameo appearance for an episode of Duhamel's show Las Vegas. Fergie and Duhamel became engaged in December 2007; they married in a Catholic ceremony on January 10, 2009. They have one son. On September 14, 2017, Fergie and Duhamel announced that they had separated earlier that year. On June 1, 2019, the couple filed for divorce after two years of separation. The divorce was finalized in November 2019.

In 2013, Fergie constructed a house in Solvang, California, which she sold in 2023. Her home in Brentwood, Los Angeles was saved from the January 2025 Southern California wildfires by firefighters.

== Discography ==
Solo albums

- The Dutchess (2006)
- Double Dutchess (2017)

With Wild Orchid

- Wild Orchid (1997)
- Oxygen (1998)

With the Black Eyed Peas

- Elephunk (2003)
- Monkey Business (2005)
- The E.N.D. (2009)
- The Beginning (2010)

== Tours ==
Headlining

- Verizon VIP Tour (2007)

Opening act

- FutureSex/LoveShow (2007)
- The Police Reunion Tour (2008)

== Filmography ==
=== Film ===
Key
†	Denotes films that have not yet been released

Year	Title	Role	Notes	Ref.
1986	Monster in the Closet	Lucy		
1998	Outside Ozona	Girl		
2000	Gentleman B.	Zeke's Girlfriend		
2005	Be Cool	Herself		
2006	Poseidon	Gloria	Credited as Stacy Ferguson	
2007	Grindhouse – Planet Terror	Tammy Visan		
2008	Immigrants	Christina Aguilera / Skinny Woman / Additional Voices	Voice role	
2008	Madagascar: Escape 2 Africa	Hippo Girlfriend	Voice role	
2009	Arthur and the Revenge of Maltazard	Replay	Voice role	
2009	Nine	Saraghina		
2010	Marmaduke	Jezebel	Voice role	
2011	Steve Jobs: One Last Thing	Herself	Documentary	
2017	Double Dutchess: Seeing Double	Fenix/Herself	Also executive producer	

=== Television ===
Year	Title	Role	Notes	Ref.
1984–1989	Kids Incorporated	Stacy	Main role	
1984	It's Flashbeagle, Charlie Brown	Sally Brown	Voice role; television special	
1985	Snoopy's Getting Married, Charlie Brown	Sally Brown	Voice role; television special	
1985–1986	The Charlie Brown and Snoopy Show	Sally Brown / Patty	Main voice role	
1986	Mr. Belvedere	Beth	Episode: "Valentine's Day"	
1986	Kids Incorporated: Rock in the New Year	Stacy	Television film	
1994	Married... with Children	Ann	Episode: "Nooner or Later"	
1995	California Dreams	Christy	Episode: "Tiffani's Gold"	
1998–2001	Great Pretenders	Herself	Host; season 1–3	
2003	Rocket Power	Shaffika	Voice role; episode: "Reggie's Big (Beach) Break"	
2004	Las Vegas	Herself	Episode: "Montecito Lancers"	
2006	Instant Def	Ella Fitzpatrick (Tag) / Bad Seed Ella	Main role	
2007–2016	Dick Clark's New Year's Rockin' Eve	Herself	Host; Hollywood concert segments	
2007	Class of 3000	Mrs. Claus	Voice role; episode: "Class of 3000 Christmas Special"	
2009–2012	The Cleveland Show	Jane / Mrs. Richter / Vanessa	Voice role; 3 episodes	
2011	Avon Voices	Herself	Judge/mentor	
2012	Fanboy & Chum Chum	Copy Kitten / Teacher's Pet	Episode: "Super Chums"	
2012	Kick Buttowski: Suburban Daredevil	April	Voice role; episode: "Bromance"	
2013	Fashion Police	Herself	Mentor; episodes: "April 12, 2013", "June 11, 2013"	
2018	The Four: Battle for Stardom	Herself	Host	
2018	The Launch	Herself	Mentor; episode: "Soldier of Love"	
2018	The Talk	Herself	Guest host; episode: "8.186"	
2019	Martha & Snoop's Potluck Dinner Party	Herself	Also contestant; episode: "Mother of All Battles"	

=== Music videos ===
Guest appearances in music videos by Fergie
Year	Title	Artist(s)	Role
2025	"Trippin"	Sturdyyoungin, Ohthatsmizz, and Zeddy Will	Teacher

== See also ==
- List of celebrities who own wineries and vineyards
