= I Don't Want Your Love =

Single by Duran Duran

from the album Big Thing
- B-side: "I Don't Want Your Love" (album version)
- Released: 19 September 1988
- Genre: Dance-pop; house; freestyle; funk
- Length: 3:47 (7″ mix); 4:06 (album version); 7:35 (Big mix); 7:36 (dub mix)
- Label: EMI; Capitol
- Songwriters: Simon Le Bon; John Taylor; Nick Rhodes
- Producers: Duran Duran; Jonathan Elias; Daniel Abraham

Duran Duran singles chronology
"Meet El Presidente" (1987)	"I Don't Want Your Love" (1988)	"All She Wants Is" (1988)

Music video
- "I Don't Want Your Love" on YouTube

"I Don't Want Your Love" is a song by the English pop rock band Duran Duran, released on 19 September 1988 as the first single from their fifth studio album, Big Thing (1988).

Cash Box called it "a serviceable single" with "a funky bass and percussive counterpoint" and "more of a mixed vocal arrangement, relying less on [Simon] Lebon's strained style."

== Music video ==
The music video for "I Don't Want Your Love" was filmed by the director Steve Lowe and produced by the Molotov Brothers, and first aired on 26 September 1988.

The video features the band in a raucous courtroom filled with spectators and tabloid reporters, "testifying" by singing the song into the court's witness microphones. The instrumental bridge in the song is accompanied by images of a young man and woman dancing or fighting (or both).

The other musicians in the video are guitarist Warren Cuccurullo (playing Chester Kamen's guitar part) and David Palmer, former drummer for ABC.

== B-sides, bonus tracks and remixes ==
The single version of "I Don't Want Your Love" was a remix by the American club DJ Shep Pettibone. It was backed by the album version for the B-side.

A UK promo 12" includes the dub mix of "I Don't Want Your Love", which was unreleased elsewhere until 1999's Strange Behaviour remix collection (which strangely didn't use the lead 12" mix entitled "Big mix").

== Formats and track listings ==
=== 7": EMI / YOUR 1 United Kingdom ===
1. "I Don't Want Your Love" (7″ mix) – 3:47
2. "I Don't Want Your Love" (album version) – 4:06
- Track 1 features additional production and mix by Shep Pettibone.

=== 12": EMI / 12 YOUR 1 United Kingdom ===
1. "I Don't Want Your Love" (Big mix) – 7:33
2. "I Don't Want Your Love" (album version) – 4:05
3. "I Don't Want Your Love" (7″ mix) – 3:47
- Also available on CD (CD YOUR 1).

=== 12": EMI / 12 YOUR DJ 1 (Promo) United Kingdom ===
1. "I Don't Want Your Love" (Big mix) – 7:35
2. "I Don't Want Your Love" (dub mix) – 7:36

=== 7": Capitol / B-44237 United States ===
1. "I Don't Want Your Love" (Big and 7 inch mix) – 3:47
2. "I Don't Want Your Love" (album version) – 4:05

=== 12": Capitol / V-15417 United States ===
1. "I Don't Want Your Love" (Big mix) – 7:35
2. "I Don't Want Your Love" (album version) – 4:05
3. "I Don't Want Your Love" (7″ mix) – 3:47

=== CD: The Singles 1986–1995 box set ===
1. "I Don't Want Your Love" (7″ mix) – 3:47
2. "I Don't Want Your Love" (album version) – 4:05
3. "I Don't Want Your Love" (Big mix) – 7:35

== Chart performance ==
"I Don't Want Your Love" debuted at number 20 and peaked the following week at number 14 on the UK singles chart, but did much better in the rest of Europe, especially in Italy where it spent six non-consecutive weeks at number 1, and was the best-selling single of 1988 in that country. It also did very well in the US, reaching number 4 on the Billboard Hot 100, and number 1 on the Billboard Hot Dance Club Play chart.

== Charts ==
=== Weekly charts ===
Weekly chart performance for "I Don't Want Your Love"
Chart (1988–1989)	Peak position
Australia (ARIA)	23
Belgium (Ultratop 50 Flanders)	15
Canada Top Singles (RPM)	6
Germany (GfK)	31
Ireland (IRMA)	8
Israel (IBA)	2
Italy (Musica e dischi)	1
Italy Airplay (Music & Media)	7
Netherlands (Single Top 100)	11
New Zealand (Recorded Music NZ)	12
Spain (AFYVE)	31
Spain Airplay (Top 40 Radio)	22
Switzerland (Schweizer Hitparade)	15
UK Singles (Official Charts)	14
US Billboard Hot 100	4
US Modern Rock Tracks (Billboard)	13
US Hot Dance Club Play (Billboard)	1

=== Year-end charts ===
Year-end chart performance for "I Don't Want Your Love"
Chart (1989)	Position
US Billboard Hot 100	62

== Personnel ==
Duran Duran

- Simon Le Bon – vocals
- John Taylor – bass
- Nick Rhodes – keyboards

Additional musicians

- Steve Ferrone – live drums
- Marc Chantereau – percussion
- Warren Cuccurullo – rhythm guitar
- Chester Kamen – noise guitar, rhythm guitar
- Stan Harrison – saxophone
- Patrick Bourgoin – saxophone
- Mac Gollehon – trumpet
- Joniece Jamison – backing vocals
- Carole Fredericks – backing vocals

Technical

- Duran Duran – producer
- Jonathan Elias – producer
- Daniel Abraham – producer
- Shep Pettibone – remixer
- Bob Rosa – remix engineer
