= Big Thing (Duran Duran album) =

Studio album by Duran Duran
- Released: 17 October 1988
- Recorded: 1987–1988
- Studio: Davout (Paris)
- Genres: Synth-pop; house; alternative dance; experimental rock
- Length: 44:48
- Label: EMI
- Producers: Duran Duran; Jonathan Elias; Daniel Abraham

Duran Duran chronology
Notorious (1986)	Big Thing (1988)	Decade (1989)

Singles from Big Thing
- 1. "I Don't Want Your Love" Released: 19 September 1988; 2. "All She Wants Is" Released: 28 December 1988; 3. "Do You Believe in Shame?" Released: 10 April 1989

Professional ratings
Review scores
Source	Rating
AllMusic	2.5/5 stars
Classic Pop	4/5 stars
The Encyclopedia of Popular Music	2/5 stars
MusicHound Rock	3/5 stars
PopMatters	6/10 stars
Orlando Sentinel	2/5 stars
Rolling Stone	3/5 stars
The Rolling Stone Album Guide	2/5 stars
Spin Alternative Record Guide	2/10

Big Thing is the fifth studio album by the English pop rock band Duran Duran. It was released on 17 October 1988 by EMI Records. Produced by the band, Jonathan Elias and Daniel Abraham, it continued the change in musical direction the band began with their previous album Notorious (1986).

The band features drummer Steve Ferrone and guitarist Warren Cuccurullo, who previously started work with the band on Notorious after the departure of Andy Taylor. Cuccurullo would become a full member of the group in 1989, whilst Feronne stayed as a session musician.

The album was a moderate commercial success, reaching number 15 on the UK Albums Chart and number 24 on the US Billboard 200. The album received mixed reviews by critics, but some praised the experimental compositions and the band's evolving musical style. The album featured two top 20 hits: the first, "I Don't Want Your Love", which went to number 14 in the UK and number 4 in the US, with the second single "All She Wants Is" reaching number 9 in the UK and number 22 in the US, the last of Duran Duran's top 10 hits during the 1980s.

A CD reissue (with one bonus track) was released in 1994. The album was reissued again by EMI in 2010.

== Singles ==
1. "I Don't Want Your Love" (September 1988) #14 UK, #4 US
2. "All She Wants Is" (December 1988) #9 UK, #22 US
3. "Do You Believe in Shame?" (April 1989) #30 UK, #72 US

=== Promotional singles ===
1. "Official Bootleg: LSD Edit" (as the Krush Brothers)
2. "Big Thing" (UK and Mexico only)
3. "Too Late Marlene" (Brazil only)

== Track listing ==
=== 1988 original release ===
All songs written and arranged by Duran Duran.

Side one
No.	Title	Length
1.	"Big Thing"	3:41
2.	"I Don't Want Your Love"	4:06
3.	"All She Wants Is"	4:34
4.	"Too Late Marlene"	5:08
5.	"Drug (It's Just a State of Mind)"	4:36

Side two
No.	Title	Length
6.	"Do You Believe in Shame?"	4:23
7.	"Palomino"	5:19
8.	"Interlude One"	0:32
9.	"Land"	6:12
10.	"Flute Interlude"	0:32
11.	"The Edge of America"	2:37
12.	"Lake Shore Driving"	3:03

Bonus track on 2006 CD reissue
No.	Title	Length
13.	"Drug (It's Just a State of Mind)" (Daniel Abraham mix)	4:20

As neither of the UK CDs show the track listings the difference between them can be identified by the catalogue numbers. These are:

- 0777 7 909582 7 (UK: CDDDB 33) Original 12 track CD
- 0777 7 898342 2 (UK: CDPRG 1007) 1994 reissue with bonus track

=== 2010 reissue ===
CD one
No.	Title	Length
1.	"Big Thing (Nocymb)"	3:41
2.	"I Don't Want Your Love"	4:06
3.	"All She Wants Is"	4:34
4.	"Too Late Marlene"	5:08
5.	"Drug (It's Just a State of Mind)*"	4:18
6.	"Do You Believe in Shame?"	4:23
7.	"Palomino"	5:19
8.	"Interlude One"	0:32
9.	"Land"	6:12
10.	"Flute Interlude"	0:32
11.	"The Edge of America"	2:37
12.	"Lake Shore Driving"	3:03

- "Drug" as included here is actually the Daniel Abraham mix included on previous releases, which is how the song was originally meant to be included on the album. The version which appeared on the original album, remixed by Joe Dworniak and Duncan Bridgeman, is included on disc two, labelled "remix".

CD two: Singles and B-sides
No.	Title	Length
1.	"I Don't Want Your Love" (7" mix)	3:47
2.	"All She Wants Is" (45 mix)	4:36
3.	"I Believe/All I Need to Know" (full version)	6:21
4.	"The Krush Brothers LSD Edit"	3:30
5.	"God (London)"	1:40
6.	"This Is How a Road Gets Made"	0:47
7.	"Palomino" (edit)	3:30
8.	"Drug (It's Just a State of Mind)" (remix)	4:36
9.	"Big Thing" (7" mix)	3:53

Mixes
No.	Title	Length
10.	"I Don't Want Your Love" (Big mix)	7:24
11.	"All She Wants Is" (US master mix)	7:19
12.	"Big Thing" (12" mix)	6:40
13.	"All She Wants Is" (Eurohouse mix)	7:34

- Tracks 3, 9 and 12 are previously unreleased.

DVD: Big Thing Live – Palatrussardi, Milan, Italy, 12 December 1988
No.	Title	Length
1.	"Introduction/God"	1:57
2.	"Big Thing"	4:10
3.	"I Don't Want Your Love"	4:48
4.	"Hungry Like the Wolf"	4:28
5.	"Do You Believe in Shame?"	4:39
6.	"All She Wants Is/Planet Earth"	5:47
7.	"This Is How a Road Gets Made/Winter Marches On"	4:20
8.	"Palomino"	5:47
9.	"Too Late Marlene"	5:52
10.	"Girls on Film"	3:43
11.	"Notorious"	4:54
12.	"Skin Trade"	5:58
13.	"Is There Something I Should Know?"	4:56
14.	"The Wild Boys/Drug"	8:02
15.	"Band Introduction/Save a Prayer"	7:48
16.	"The Reflex"	4:03
17.	"Rio"	3:41
18.	"The Edge of America"	9:42

The Videos
No.	Title	Length
19.	"I Don't Want Your Love"
20.	"All She Wants Is"
21.	"Do You Believe in Shame?"

=== Japanese bonus disc ===
Toshiba EMI also released Big Thing in a two-disc set, which featured not only the complete album, but a five-song live CD, Previously released as Duran Goes Dutch (US promo EP, 1987):

1. "Notorious" (live)
2. "Vertigo (Do the Demolition)" (live)
3. "New Religion" (live)
4. "Hungry Like the Wolf" (live)
5. "American Science" (live)

== Personnel ==
Duran Duran

- Simon Le Bon – lead vocals
- Nick Rhodes – keyboards
- John Taylor – bass guitars

Additional musicians

- Warren Cuccurullo – guitars (tracks: 1–7, 9–12)
- Steve Ferrone – drums (tracks: 1–4, 6, 9, 12)
- Chester Kamen – guitars (tracks: 2, 3)

Technical

- Jonathan Elias – co-producer
- Daniel Abraham – co-producer and mixer
- Ted Jensen – mastering

== Charts ==
=== Weekly charts ===
Weekly chart performance for Big Thing
Chart (1988)	Peak position
Australian Albums (ARIA)	46
Canada Top Albums/CDs (RPM)	21
Canadian Albums (The Record)	29
Dutch Albums (Album Top 100)	77
European Albums (Music & Media)	29
German Albums (Offizielle Top 100)	31
Italian Albums (Musica e dischi)	5
Japanese Albums (Oricon)	9
New Zealand Albums (RMNZ)	34
Swedish Albums (Sverigetopplistan)	27
Swiss Albums (Schweizer Hitparade)	19
UK Albums (Official Charts)	15
US Billboard 200	24

2024 weekly chart performance for Big Thing
Chart (2024)	Peak position
Hungarian Physical Albums (MAHASZ)	9

=== Year-end charts ===
Year-end chart performance for Big Thing
Chart (1989)	Position
US Billboard 200	83

== Certifications ==
Certifications for Big Thing
Region	Certification	Certified units/sales
United Kingdom (BPI)	Silver	60,000^{^}
United States (RIAA)	Gold	500,000^{^}
^{^} Shipments figures based on certification alone.
