= Disney Channel =

American children's pay television channel

- Logo used since February 1, 2025

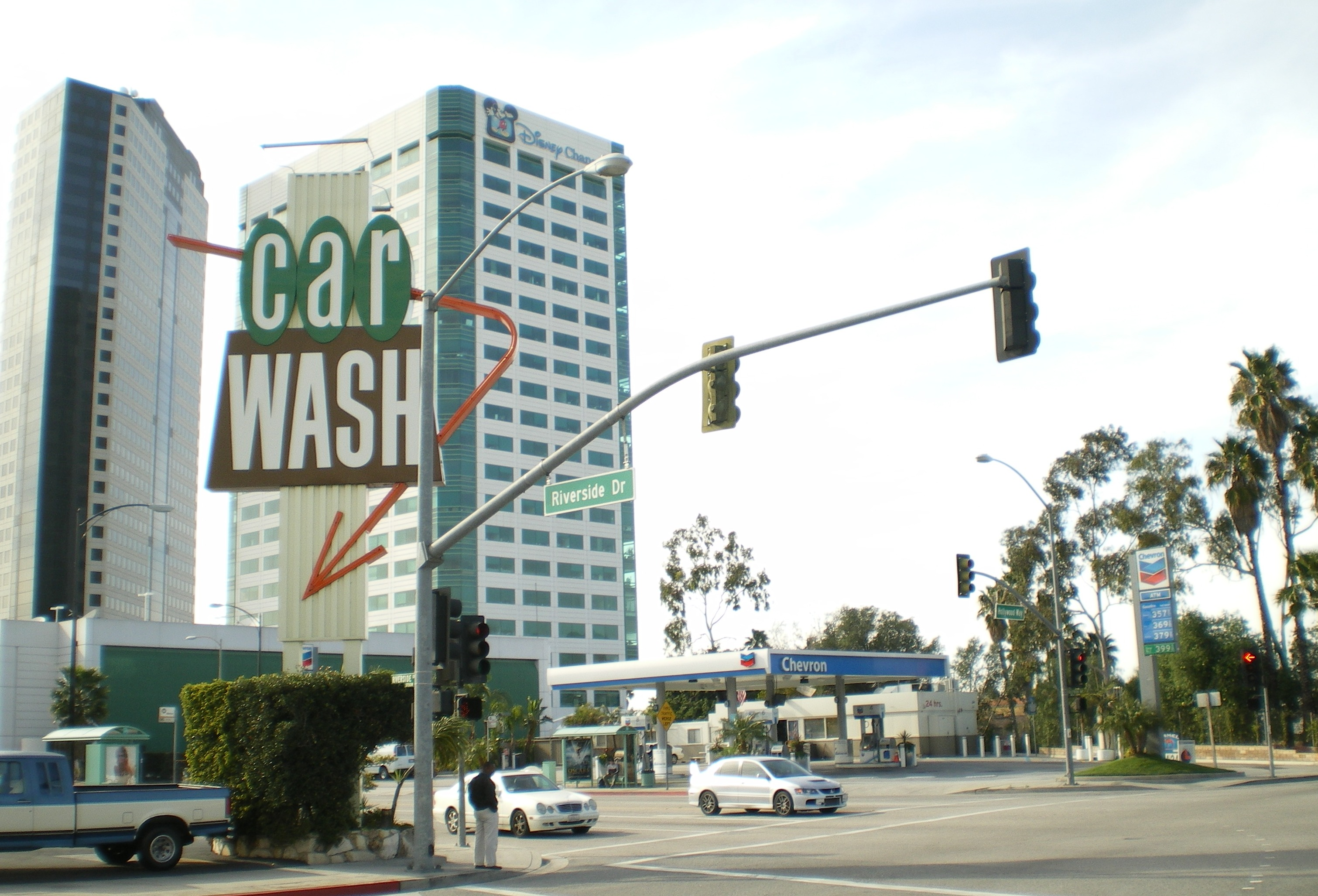
- Headquarters located at 3800 W. Alameda Ave, Burbank, California. Pictured on March 3, 2008.
- Country: United States
- Broadcast area: Nationwide
- Headquarters: Burbank, California, U.S.

Programming
- Languages: English; Spanish (via SAP audio track)
- Picture format: 720p HDTV (downscaled to letterboxed 480i for the SDTV feed)

Ownership
- Owner: Disney Entertainment
- Parent: Disney Kids & Family
- Sister channels: List: Disney Jr.; Disney XD; ABC; A&E; ACC Network; Lifetime; LMN; Localish; ESPN; SEC Network; Freeform; FX; FXX; FXM; FYI; C&I; History; National Geographic; Nat Geo Wild

History
- Launched: April 18, 1983; 43 years ago
- Former names: The Disney Channel (1983–1997)

Links
- Webcast: Watch live
- Website: Official website

Availability

Streaming media
- Affiliated streaming service: Disney+
- Service(s): Fubo TV, Hulu + Live TV, Sling TV, YouTube TV, DirecTV Stream

Disney Channel is an American pay television channel that serves as the flagship property of Disney Kids & Family, a unit of the Disney Entertainment business segment of the Walt Disney Company.

Launched on April 18, 1983, under the name The Disney Channel as a premium channel on top of basic cable television systems, it originally showcased programming towards families due to availability of home television sets locally at the time. It dropped "The" from its name in 1997, with its programming shifting focus to target mainly children and adolescents ages 6–14. The channel showcases original first-run children's television series, theatrically released and original television films and other selected third-party programming.

As of November 2023, Disney Channel is available to approximately 70 million pay television households in the United States — down from its peak of 100 million households in 2011. The channel's international footprint, once encompassing 46 channels available in 33 languages, has also diminished due to the launch of Disney+ and competition from streaming media and social media platforms.

== History ==
The 2002 logo used for Disney Channel.

Disney Channel launched nationally as a premium channel at 7:00 a.m. Eastern Time on April 18, 1983, under the name The Disney Channel. The channel's development with help from its founding president Alan Wagner, and formally announced the launch of its family-oriented cable channel in early 1983. The channel – which initially maintained a 16-hour-per-day programming schedule from 7:00 a.m. to 11:00 p.m. Eastern and Pacific Time – would become available on cable providers in all 50 U.S. states by September 1983, and accrue a base of more than 611,000 subscribers by December of that year. In October 1983, the channel debuted its first made-for-cable movie, Tiger Town, which earned the channel a CableACE Award. The channel had reached profitability by January 1985, with its programming reaching 1.75 million subscribers by that point.

In September 1990, TCI's Montgomery, Alabama, system became the first cable provider to carry the channel as a basic cable service. Between 1991 and 1996, a steadily increasing number of cable providers began shifting The Disney Channel from a premium add-on offering to their basic tiers, either experimentally or on a full-time basis; however, Walt Disney Company executives denied any plans to convert the channel into an ad-supported basic service, stating that the premium-to-basic shifts on some providers was part of a five-year "hybrid" strategy that allowed providers to offer the channel in either manner. On April 6, 1997, the channel officially rebranded as Disney Channel, although occasionally marketed as just "Disney" from 1997 to 2002.

== Programming ==
=== Movie library ===
Television films have also been produced for broadcast on Disney Channel since its launch under the banner of Disney Channel Premiere Films, with the first film released being Tiger Town in 1983, until October 1997, which is when they stopped using the "Premiere Films" label and renamed it the "Disney Channel Original Movies" (DCOM) thereafter. The first movie to be released under the Disney Channel Original Movie category was Under Wraps, a Halloween themed movie that aired for the first time on Disney Channel on October 25, 1997.

The most successful original film under the banner in terms of popularity and accolades is High School Musical 2, which debuted on August 17, 2007, to 17.2 million viewers and set a current longstanding record for the highest-rated television premiere in the history of the channel. Following High School Musical 2, the movie that had the second highest-rated Disney Channel Original Movie (DCOM) premiere was Wizards of Waverly Place: The Movie, followed by Camp Rock, Descendants 2, Princess Protection Program, Teen Beach Movie, and Jump In!. It also set a basic cable record for the single most-watched television program until December 3, 2007, when corporate sister channel, ESPN, surpassed it with the telecast of an NFL game between the New England Patriots and Baltimore Ravens on its Monday Night Football programme by 0.3 million viewers more (17.5 million viewers). The Cheetah Girls media franchise was also notably successful in terms of merchandise and sales for its concert tours and soundtrack albums. Its debut film from 2003, being the first Disney Channel original musical television film, premiered to over 84 million global viewers and its sequel premiered to 8.1 million American viewers and in the process became the most successful of the film series. An 86-date concert tour featuring the eponymous girl group was ranked as one of the top 10 concert tours of 2006, smashing the record at the Houston Rodeo previously set by Elvis Presley in 1973, selling out with 73,500 tickets in three minutes at one point.

In addition to its original television films, Disney Channel has rights to theatrically released feature films, with some film rights shared with sister network, Freeform. Alongside films released by Walt Disney Studios Motion Pictures (mainly consisting of releases from Walt Disney Pictures, Walt Disney Animation Studios and Pixar), the channel also maintains rights to films from other studios. Some films released by Bagdasarian Productions (such as The Chipmunk Adventure and Alvin and the Chipmunks Meet Frankenstein) have also aired on Disney Channel, although most of them are not currently owned by any of the Walt Disney Company's divisions.

=== Programming blocks ===
==== Current ====
- Disney Jr. – A weekday morning block of preschool programming from Disney Jr. (Disney Junior prior to June 2024) It debuted on February 14, 2011, following the closure of Playhouse Disney; In June 2020, Mickey Mouse-hosted continuity segments branded as "Mickey Mornings" were launched, replacing the previous "Disney Junior on Disney Channel" branding. The Mickey Mornings branding was quietly phased out in November 2025, reverting to the Disney Jr. branding, followed by the interstitials in December.

==== Former ====
- Disney Nighttime – As The Disney Channel as a premium channel from its launch until April 6, 1997, this block featured programming aimed at older parental audiences during the evening and overnight hours under the banner title "Disney Nighttime". The content seen in these blocks was devoid of sexual and violent content. Programming seen during Disney Nighttime included older feature films (similar to those seen at the time on American Movie Classics, and eventually Turner Classic Movies, with both Disney film titles and movies from other film studios mixed in), alongside original concert specials (featuring artists ranging from Rick Springfield to Jon Secada to Elton John), variety specials and documentaries.
- The Magical World of Disney – used as a Sunday night umbrella for films and specials on The Disney Channel from September 23, 1990, to November 24, 1996, originally airing exclusively on Sunday evenings at 7:00 p.m. Eastern/Pacific. From December 1, 1996, to 2001, The Magical World of Disney served as the overall branding for Disney Channel's nightly evening lineup of films starting at 7:00 p.m. Eastern/Pacific.
- The American Legacy – ran on Tuesday evenings at 9:00 p.m. Eastern/Pacific from January 7, 1992, to August 27, 1996. Originally launched in honor of the 500th anniversary of the discovery of the United States, the block featured films, documentaries and specials about the contributions, history and scenic wonders of the nation.
- Toonin' Tuesday – Running from October 5, 1993, to August 27, 1996, "Toonin' Tuesday" was a weekly program block featuring various animated programs. Each Tuesday from 6:00 to 9:00 p.m. Eastern/Pacific, "Toonin' Tuesday" featured primarily animated films and specials (though reruns of The Charlie Brown and Snoopy Show sometimes aired as part of the block). The block ended on August 27, 1996, due to changes to the channel's programming schedule.
- Bonus! Thursday – From October 7, 1993, to August 29, 1996, The Disney Channel ran a weekly program block called "Bonus! Thursday" (or "Bonus!" for short), which ran each Thursday from 5:00 to 9:00 p.m. Eastern/Pacific. The block featured programs aimed at teenagers, including series such as Kids Incorporated, The All-New Mickey Mouse Club, various Mickey Mouse Club serials (including Teen Angel and Match Point), and Eerie Indiana, followed by films and specials. The block ended on August 29, 1996, due to changes to the channel's programming schedule.
- Totally Kids Only ("TKO") – an afternoon lineup of live-action and animated series introduced in 1992, which became the overall branding for the channel's daytime children's programs from 1995 to 1996.
- Triple Feature Friday – ran each Friday starting at 5:00 p.m. Eastern/Pacific from October 8, 1993, to May 30, 1997, featured three separate films – sometimes regardless of each film's genre – that were tied to a specific subject
- Disney Drive-In – ran each Saturday starting at 1:30 p.m. Eastern/Pacific from October 8, 1994, to August 31, 1996, featured Disney series such as Zorro, Texas John Slaughter and Spin and Marty, followed by Disney films and specials The block ended on August 31, 1996, due to changes in the channel's schedule.
- Block Party – From October 2, 1995, to August 28, 1996, four animated series that previously aired in syndication on The Disney Afternoon (Darkwing Duck, TaleSpin, DuckTales and Chip 'n Dale Rescue Rangers) were rerun together on The Disney Channel as a two-hour programming block called "Block Party", which aired weekdays from 5:00 to 7:00 p.m. Eastern/Pacific. The "Block Party" branding was dropped on September 3, 1996, when Darkwing Duck was removed as the block's lead-in and Goof Troop was added to end the lineup. This unnamed block continued to air into 1997.
- Magical World of Animals – an hour-long block of wildlife series aimed at children that ran from August 1997 to 1999. Promoted as an offshoot of the Magical World of Disney and airing Sunday evenings from 7:00 to 8:00 p.m. Eastern Time, the block consisted of two series: Going Wild with Jeff Corwin and Omba Mokomba.
- Vault Disney – premiered in September 1997, five months after Disney Channel's first major rebrand, replacing the Disney Nighttime lineup. Originally airing only on Sunday nights from 9:00 p.m. to 6:00 a.m. Eastern and Pacific Time, Vault Disney expanded to seven nights a week in September 1998 (the Monday through Saturday editions of the block at this time aired from 11:00 p.m. to 6:00 a.m. Eastern/Pacific; the start time of the block as a whole was moved consistently to midnight daily in September 1999). The vintage programming featured during the late-night schedule changed to feature only Disney-produced television series and specials (such as Zorro, Spin and Marty, The Mickey Mouse Club and the Walt Disney anthology television series), along with older Disney television specials. Older Disney feature films also were part of the lineup from 1997 to 2000 but aired in a reduced capacity. The block also featured The Ink and Paint Club, an anthology series featuring Disney animated shorts, which became the only remaining program on the channel to feature these shorts by 1999, upon the removal of Quack Pack from the schedule. The channel discontinued the block in September 2002, in favor of running reruns of its original and acquired series during the late evening and overnight hours (which comparative to the adult-focused Vault Disney, are aimed at children and teenagers, an audience that is typically asleep during that time period).
- Zoog Disney – launched in August 1998, a program block that originally aired only on weekend afternoons from 4:00 p.m. to 7:00 p.m. Eastern/Pacific. The hosts for the block were "Zoogs", animated anthropomorphic robot/alien creature-hybrid characters with human voices (some of whom acted like teenagers). The block unified television and the Internet, allowing viewer comments and scores from players of ZoogDisney.com's online games to be aired on the channel during regular programming in a ticker format (which the channel continued to use after the block was discontinued, however, the ticker has been all but completely dropped from on-air usage as of May 2010). From June 2000 to August 2002, the afternoon and primetime lineups on Fridays, Saturdays, and Sundays were branded under the umbrella title "Zoog Weekendz". The Zoogs were redesigned with cel shading and given mature voices in 2000. The entire Zoog Disney block was phased out by September 2002.
- Disney Replay – "Disney Replay" was a block that premiered on April 17, 2013, featuring episodes of defunct Disney Channel Original Series that premiered between 2000 and 2007 (such as Lizzie McGuire, That's So Raven, The Suite Life of Zack & Cody and Hannah Montana). Airing Wednesday nights/early Thursday mornings (as a nod to the popular social media trend "Throwback Thursday"), originally from 12:00 to 1:00 a.m. Eastern and Pacific Time, the block expanded to six hours (running until 6:00 a.m. Eastern/Pacific) on August 14, 2014. Programs featured on Disney Replay were added to the WATCH Disney Channel service on August 16, 2014. The block was discontinued on April 28, 2016, and moved to Freeform with a new name: That's So Throwback.
- Disney XD on Disney Channel – "Disney XD on Disney Channel" is the former branding of two blocks airing on Friday and Saturday nights; an animated block airing Fridays from 9:00 p.m. to 10:00 p.m., showing series mainly exclusive to Disney XD such as Phineas and Ferb, Star vs. the Forces of Evil, Milo Murphy's Law, and DuckTales, and a live-action block airing Saturdays from 10:00 p.m. to 11:00 p.m., airing series such as MECH-X4 and Walk the Prank. It was discontinued as Disney XD's carriage became equivalent to that of Disney Channel.

=== Bumpers ===
In between regularly scheduled programming and advertisement breaks, Disney Channel features bumpers. The creator of the four-note mnemonic introduced for the channel in 2002, was relatively unknown until being identified as Alex Lasarenko, who had also worked with Tonal Sound and Elias Arts, by YouTube documentary channel Defunctland in 2022.

=== Sports ===
For a period, ESPN's broadcasts of the Little League World Series baseball tournament frequently featured cross-promotion with music-related Disney Channel properties, with past editions having featured collaborations with High School Musical, the Jonas Brothers, Camp Rock, and Phineas and Ferb.

In March 2023, Disney Channel broadcast a live professional sporting event for the first time, carrying a youth-oriented alternate broadcast of a National Hockey League (NHL) game—known as the Big City Greens Classic—as part of ESPN's coverage of the league. The broadcast was themed around the Disney Channel animated series Big City Greens, visualizing data from the league's player and puck tracking system with 3D animated players.

== Related channels and programs ==
=== Current sister channels ===
==== Disney Jr. ====
Disney Jr. logo

Disney Jr. is a daily morning program block aimed at preschoolers, spiritually succeeding Playhouse Disney which launched on April 6, 1997, as part of Disney Channel's morning lineup. On May 26, 2010, Disney General Entertainment Content (at the time known as Disney-ABC Television Group) announced the expansion of the block in to a 24/7 cable and satellite channel which debuted on March 23, 2012 The channel would be commercial-free channel and compete with other preschooler-skewing cable channels such as the Nick Jr. Channel and Universal Kids (previously known as PBS Kids Sprout and then Sprout). The channel features programs from Disney Channel's existing preschool programming library and films/movies from the Walt Disney Pictures film library. On its launch, Disney Junior took over the channel space held by Soapnet – a Disney-owned cable channel featuring soap operas – due to that genre's decline in popularity on broadcast television and the growth of video on demand, online streaming and digital video recorders negating the need for a linear channel devoted to the soap opera genre. After a period during which cable providers unwilling to drop the network immediately retained it to prevent subscriber cancellations, Soapnet ceased all operations on December 31, 2013. The former Playhouse Disney block on Disney Channel rebranded as Disney Junior on February 14, 2011, along with the existing international channels; they had their names shortened to "Disney Jr." since June 1, 2024, although spelt/pronounced the same as before. Disney-ABC Television Group once planned to launch a Playhouse Disney-branded channel in the United States in 2001, however it never happened despite launching internationally.

==== Disney XD ====
Disney XD logo

Launched on February 13, 2009, as the successor to Toon Disney, Disney XD is a cable and satellite television channel which was originally aimed at young male audiences aged 6 to 14, but has since included girls in its programming. The channel showcases action and comedy programming from Disney Channel and the former Jetix block from Toon Disney, alongside some first-run original programming and off-network syndicated shows. Disney XD, unlike its sister channels Disney Channel and Disney Junior, operates as an ad-supported service, similar to its predecessor Toon Disney. The channel carries the same name as an unrelated mini-site and media player on Disney.com, which stood for Disney Xtreme Digital, though it is said that the "XD" in the channel's name does not have an actual meaning.

=== Former sister channels ===
- Toon Disney – Launched on April 18, 1998, during the 15th anniversary celebration of the launch of sister network, Disney Channel, this channel was aimed at children and teenagers between the ages of 6 and 18. The network's main competitors at launch were Turner Broadcasting System's Cartoon Network and MTV Networks' Nickelodeon. Toon Disney initially operated as a commercial-free service from its launch until September 1999 when, unlike Disney Channel, it became ad-supported. The channel carried a mix of reruns of animated productions from Walt Disney Television Animation and Disney Channel, alongside some third-party programs from other distributors, animated films and original programming. In 2004, the channel introduced a nighttime program block aimed at children ages 7 to 14 called Jetix, which featured action-oriented animated and live-action series. During Toon Disney's first year on the air, Disney Channel ran a sampler block of Toon Disney's programming on Sunday nights for interested subscribers. The network's successor, Disney XD, which launched on February 13, 2009, is also a channel also aimed at children and features a broader array of programming, with a heavier emphasis on live-action programs.
- Jetix launched as a programming block in the United States on Toon Disney on February 14, 2004, to compete with Cartoon Network's Toonami block, and in Europe in April 2004. By the end of 2004, Jetix started to completely replace global Fox Kids-branded channels, with the first of them being the French version in August 2004 and the last one being the German version in June 2005. The network's successor, Disney XD, launched on February 13, 2009, and features heavier emphasis on live-action programs.
  - Jetix Play was the sister channel to Jetix and owned by its dedicated company Jetix Europe that was broadcast in a small number of regions, such as Central and Eastern Europe and Middle East. The channel officially launched on January 1, 2005, and was available for 12 hours per day from 6 A.M. to 6 P.M. Jetix Play was aimed at a younger audience than the main Jetix channel and primarily showed archived programming from the catalogues of BVS Entertainment (previously known as Saban Entertainment) and Fox Kids Europe. Jetix Play was replaced with Playhouse Disney and later Disney Jr. (Note: It was previously shown and spelt visually as Disney Junior between its launch in 2011 until 2024.) in most regions by 2010.
- Radio Disney was a radio network aimed towards music programming is oriented towards children, pre-teens and teenagers. Launched on November 18, 1996, the network focused mainly on current hit music and placed a heavy emphasis on talents who signed with Walt Disney Records and/or Hollywood Records, the two record labels of Disney Music Group. On December 3, 2020, the Walt Disney Company announced its closure in first quarter of 2021 during the company's restructuring activities. On April 14, 2021, its feeds ceased totally when its last remaining terrestrial station was changed to a simulcast of KSPN.

=== Other services ===
Service	Description
Disney Channel HD	Disney Channel HD is a high-definition simulcast feed of Disney Channel that broadcasts in the 720p resolution format; the feed first began broadcasting on April 2, 2008. Most of the channel's original programming since 2009 is produced and broadcast in HD, along with feature films, Disney Channel original movies made after 2005, and select episodes, films, and series produced before 2009. Disney XD and Disney Jr. also offer their own high-definition simulcast feeds.
Disney Channel on Demand	Disney Channel on-Demand is the channel's video-on-demand service, offering select episodes of the channel's original series and Disney Junior programming, along with select original movies and behind-the-scenes features to digital cable and IPTV providers.
DisneyNow	DisneyNow is a TV Everywhere service that allows subscribers to Disney Channel on participating television providers to stream the channel's programming live and on-demand. The service succeeds Disney Channel's original TV Everywhere service, "Watch Disney Channel", which launched in June 2012; in September 2017, Disney replaced the separate apps for Disney Channel Jr. and XD with DisneyNow.
Disney+	Launched in November 2019, Disney+ is a subscription video-on-demand streaming service owned and operated by the Direct-to-Consumer & International (DTCI) (now the Media & Entertainment Distribution) division of the Walt Disney Company. The service primarily distributes films and television series produced by the Walt Disney Studios and Disney General Entertainment Content, with the service advertising content from Disney's Marvel, National Geographic, Pixar and Star Wars brands.
Former services
Disney Family Movies	Disney Family Movies is a defunct subscription video-on-demand service that launched on December 10, 2008, replacing Disney's previous service MovieBeam, which used a data stream from over-the-air television stations to offer purchasable films from the studio via a set-top box. The service offered a limited selection of movies and short films from the Walt Disney Pictures film catalog for a fee of about $5 to $10 per month, making it similar in structure to Disney Channel's original model as a premium service. Disney Family Movies was discontinued on October 31, 2019, prior to the launch of Disney+, which offers a wider film selection beyond cable on-demand provider deliveries.

=== Production studios ===
==== Disney Television Animation ====
Also known by its trade name, "Disney Channel Animation", it is the television animation production studio division of the Walt Disney Studios and based in Glendale, California, providing original animated programming for the three main Disney-branded television channels.

==== It's a Laugh Productions ====
A live-action production studio based in Studio City, Los Angeles, California, that provides original sitcoms and comedy programs primary for Disney Channel. Despite being the prime production source of Disney Channel shows, many of its projects are still co-produced and financed by the Walt Disney Company.

==== Walt Disney EMEA Productions ====
Walt Disney EMEA Productions Limited is the network's European production studio located in London, England, which co-produces original programs within Europe alongside other companies.

==== Disney Original Documentary ====
Disney Original Documentary is a banner from Disney Branded Television for documentary-based programs broadcast on Disney Channel and released on Disney+ that launched on December 9, 2021.

== Media ==
=== Video games ===
In 2010, Disney Channel All Star Party was released for the Nintendo Wii. The four-player mascot party game, in which the stages resemble board games, features characters from Disney Channel programs such as Sonny with a Chance, Wizards of Waverly Place, and JONAS L.A. Several video games based on the Disney Channel animated series Phineas and Ferb were released by Disney Interactive Studios. The Disney Channel website also featured various Flash games incorporating characters from the channel's various program franchises, including Kim Possible and Hannah Montana.

== Marketing programs ==
In June 2012, the Walt Disney Company announced that it would stop advertising or promoting food or beverage products that do not meet strict nutritional guidelines. Disney Channel purportedly became the first media company to take such a stance on stopping the marketing of junk food products to kids. Due to its commercial-free format, such advertising appears only in the form of underwriter sponsorships during promotional breaks.

On July 1, 2012, Disney Channel began providing Descriptive Video Service audio in compliance with the 21st Century Communications and Video Accessibility Act of 2010, which required network owned-and-operated stations and affiliates in the 25 largest television markets as well as the five highest-rated cable and satellite channels (including Disney Channel) to offer audio descriptions for the blind. This is accompanied by an on-screen mark at the beginning of certain scheduled programming indicating to viewers that the service is available. Some episodes of Gravity Falls, Austin & Ally, Good Luck Charlie, and Phineas and Ferb show the AD))) mark and a 2-tone sound repeated 3 times at the beginning of the episode to give notice of the audio description track available through the SAP feed. Disney Junior displays the AD)) mark and the intended SAP track on newer episodes of Little Einsteins. (ABC positions this mark in the bottom-left corner of the screen.)

== International ==
Disney Channel has established presence in various regions across the Americas, most of Europe, the Middle East, Africa, India, and Japan. Channel versions/feeds were also available or used to exist in Australia, New Zealand, Italy, the United Kingdom and Ireland, Southeast Asia, Hong Kong, South Korea, Taiwan, Turkey, Spain and Brazil, but ceased broadcast since the early 2020s, with most content moving to Disney+ or Disney+ Hotstar following their launches in those countries/regions.

On December 14, 2022, Disney ceased its distribution of programs in Russia in response to the ongoing Russian invasion of Ukraine.

Disney Channel also licenses its programming to air on certain other broadcast and cable channels outside the United States (formerly including Family Channel in Canada), regardless of whether or not a localized channel feed already exists in that country.

== Criticism ==
Some critics disapprove of the Disney Channel marketing strategy led by Anne Sweeney, president of the Disney Channel from 1996 to 2014. Under Sweeney, Disney Channel's programming was geared mainly towards preteen and teenage girls, with a decrease in animated programming. Criticism was also aimed at removing almost all Walt-era and pre-1990s material from the channel in 2002 with the removal of the late-night "Vault Disney" block devoted to this material, which used to make up the majority of the channel's programming since its inception in 1983. In 2008, Sweeney explained that Disney Channel, resulting from its multi-platform marketing strategy using television and music, would become "the major profit driver for the [Walt Disney] Company."

The channel has also pulled (and sometimes re-shot) episodes that have featured subject matter deemed inappropriate for its target audience, due either to humor or to timing of real-life events.

- In November 2008, the episode "No Sugar, Sugar" (Hannah Montana), in which Mitchel Musso's character, Oliver Oken, is revealed to have Type 1 diabetes, was pulled before its broadcast, due to parent complaints about its portrayal of diabetics and sugar intake.
- In December 2011, Disney Channel pulled episodes of two of its original series, due to complaints on Twitter from Demi Lovato about their portrayal of eating disorders. Pulled episodes included "Party It Up" (Shake It Up) and "Colbie Caillat" (So Random!).
- In May 2013, Disney Channel pulled "Quitting Cold Koala" (Jessie) due to parental concerns over a scene in which a character's gluten-free diet leads to ridicule.
- On June 13, 2023, the opening sequence of the series Primos, which premiered on the Disney Channel in July 2024, was released by Disney Branded Television, with a mixed reception to the sequence on social media, including from Latinos and Mexicans. Some viewers argued that the sequence had various negative stereotypes, complained about names of some characters, and claimed the Spanish pronunciation of some characters in the sequence was incorrect.

== See also ==
- Disney Jr.
- Disney XD
- Radio Disney
- Disney Cinemagic
- Playhouse Disney
- Toon Disney

== Bibliography ==
- Grover, Ron (1991). The Disney Touch: How a Daring Management Team Revived an Entertainment Empire. Business One Irwin. ISBN 1-55623-385-X.
