= All She Wants Is =

Single by Duran Duran

from the album Big Thing
- B-side: "I Believe/All I Need to Know"
- Released: 28 December 1988
- Studio: Davout (Paris, France)
- Genre: Synth-pop; house; electro-funk
- Length: 4:36 (45 mix); 7:34 (Euro dub mix); 7:19 (US master mix); 7:08 (House dub); 6:43 (US master dub)
- Label: EMI; Capitol
- Songwriters: Simon Le Bon; John Taylor; Nick Rhodes
- Producers: Duran Duran; Jonathan Elias; Daniel Abraham

Duran Duran singles chronology
"I Don't Want Your Love" (1988)	"All She Wants Is" (1988)	"Do You Believe in Shame?" (1989)

Music video
- "All She Wants Is" on YouTube

"All She Wants Is" is a song by the English pop rock band Duran Duran. It was released on 28 December 1988 as the second single from their fifth studio album, Big Thing (1988), and reached No. 9 on the UK Singles Chart and No. 22 on the Billboard Hot 100 in the United States. "All She Wants Is" had a bigger impact in the UK than its predecessor ("I Don't Want Your Love"), hitting the top ten; it was the last of twelve UK top ten hits for Duran Duran during the 1980s.

There are seven official mixes of "All She Wants Is", which were all done by Shep Pettibone. The single's B-side is an original medley called "I Believe/All I Need to Know".

== Critical reception ==
Cashbox called it a "growling, thumping rock extravaganza that's danceable." Jerry Smith of Music Week thought that the "stylish track from their Big Thing LP deserves attention." Music & Media wrote that the song was an "acid -inspired cut" that was "more likely to re-establish [Duran Duran] than the overly derivative 'I Don't Want Your Love'." Writing for AllMusic, Mike DeGagne thought that the song's tempo was "unfavorable" and "gained most of its attention because of its unorthodox style."

== Music video ==
The video for "All She Wants Is" was shot in London with video director Dean Chamberlain, a well-known photographer who had previously taken pictures and filmed a video for the side project Arcadia. The clip won a 1988 MTV Video Music Award for innovation.

== Formats and track listings ==
=== 7": EMI / DD 11 United Kingdom ===
1. "All She Wants Is" (45 mix) – 4:36
2. "I Believe/All I Need to Know" (medley) – 5:04

=== 12": EMI / 12 DD 11 United Kingdom ===
1. "All She Wants Is" (Euro dub mix) – 7:34 (a.k.a. "Euro house mix")
2. "All She Wants Is" (45 mix) – 4:36
3. "I Believe/All I Need to Know" (medley) – 5:04

=== 12": EMI / 12 DDX 11 United Kingdom ===
1. "All She Wants Is" (US master mix) – 7:19
2. "All She Wants Is" (45 mix) – 4:36
3. "I Believe/All I Need to Know" (medley) – 5:04

=== 12": EMI / 12 DD-DJ11 (Promo) United Kingdom ===
1. "All She Wants Is" (Euro house mix) – 7:34 (a.k.a. "Euro dub mix")
2. "All She Wants Is" (45 mix) – 4:36
3. "All She Wants Is" (US master mix) – 7:19
4. "All She Wants Is" (House dub) – 7:08 (a.k.a. "Euro house dub", "Euro house dub I")

=== 7": Capitol / B-44287 United States ===
1. "All She Wants Is" (45 mix) – 4:36
2. "I Believe/All I Need to Know" (medley) – 5:04
- Also available on MC in the US (Capitol / 4BX-44287)

=== 12": Capitol / V-15434 United States ===
1. "All She Wants Is" (US master mix) – 7:16
2. "All She Wants Is" (Euro house mix) – 7:32 (a.k.a. "Euro dub mix")
3. "All She Wants Is" (45 mix) – 4:34
4. "I Believe/All I Need to Know" (medley) – 5:04

=== 12": Capitol / SPRO-79483 (Promo) United States ===
1. "All She Wants Is" (US master mix) – 7:16
2. "All She Wants Is" (US masterdub) – 6:43 (a.k.a. "Latino dub")
3. "All She Wants Is" (Euro house mix) – 7:32 (a.k.a. "Euro dub mix")
4. "All She Wants Is" (Euro house dub I) – 7:07 (a.k.a. "House dub", "Euro house dub")
5. "All She Wants Is" (Euro house dub II) – 5:43

=== 12": EMI / K 060 20 32366 Netherlands ===
1. "All She Wants Is" (House dub) – 7:07 (a.k.a. "Euro house dub", "Euro house dub I")
2. "All She Wants Is" (Latino dub) – 6:44 (a.k.a. "US masterdub")
3. "All She Wants Is" (7" version) – 4:31
- Also released on German CD (EMI-Electrola / CDP 560-20-3236-2)

=== CD: EMI / CD DD 11 (United Kingdom) ===
1. "All She Wants Is" (45 mix) – 4:36
2. "Skin Trade" (Parisian mix) – 8:10
3. "I Believe/All I Need to Know" (medley) – 5:09
- Also available on 3" CD in the US (Capitol / C3-44287-2)

=== CD: Toshiba-EMI / XP12-5006 (Japan) ===
1. "All She Wants Is" (45 mix) – 4:36
2. "All She Wants Is" (Euro dub mix) – 7:34 (a.k.a. "Euro house mix")
3. "I Believe/All I Need to Know" (medley) – 5:09
- 3" CD reworking of the first UK 12"

== Personnel ==
Duran Duran

- Simon Le Bon – vocals
- John Taylor – bass
- Nick Rhodes – keyboards

Additional musicians

- Chester Kamen – guitars
- Sterling Campbell – drums
- Warren Cuccurullo – guitars

Technical

- Duran Duran – producer
- Jonathan Elias – producer
- Daniel Abraham – producer, mixer (45 mix)
- Shep Pettibone – remixer
- Goh Hotoda – remix engineer
- Freddie Stopler – heavy breathing

== Charts ==
Chart performance for "All She Wants Is"
Chart (1989)	Peak position
Canada Top Singles (RPM)	42
Germany (GfK)	28
Ireland (IRMA)	10
Israel (IBA)	2
Italy (Musica e dischi)	2
Netherlands (Single Top 100)	44
New Zealand (Recorded Music NZ)	49
Spain Airplay (Top 40 Radio)	38
UK Singles (Official Charts)	9
US Billboard Hot 100	22
US Modern Rock Tracks (Billboard)	24
US Hot Dance Club Play (Billboard)	1
