= Do You Believe in Shame? =

Single by Duran Duran

from the album Big Thing
- B-side: "The Krush Brothers LSD Edit"; "God (London)"; "This Is How a Road Gets Made"; "Drug" (original version); "Palomino" (edit)
- Released: 10 April 1989
- Genre: Pop; rock; new wave
- Length: 4:25 (single version)
- Label: EMI; Capitol
- Songwriters: Eleanor Broadwater; A Delmar Hawkins Jnr; J Stanley Lewis; Simon Le Bon; Nick Rhodes; John Taylor
- Producers: Duran Duran; Jonathan Elias; Daniel Abraham; John Jones

Duran Duran singles chronology
"All She Wants Is" (1988)	"Do You Believe in Shame?" (1989)	"Burning the Ground" (1989)

Music video
- "Do You Believe in Shame?" on YouTube

"Do You Believe in Shame?" is a song by the English pop rock band Duran Duran, released on 10 April 1989 as the third and final single from their fifth studio album, Big Thing (1988).

== Background ==
The song was dedicated to three of the band's deceased friends: record producer Alex Sadkin, artist Andy Warhol and Simon Le Bon's childhood friend David Miles. Le Bon has since said that "Shame" is the first part of a trilogy of songs written as a tribute to Miles, the other songs being "Ordinary World" and "Out of My Mind".

Cash Box said that the song "is a shameless ripoff of 'Suzie Q'. Same feel, same melody. And not surprisingly, it's the best thing we've heard out of D.D."

There was a successful legal challenge over the close resemblance of the melody of "Do You Believe in Shame?" to that of the Dale Hawkins classic "Suzie Q" (more famously covered by Creedence Clearwater Revival and the Rolling Stones). The writing credits were changed accordingly.

== Release ==
"Do You Believe in Shame?" was released to coincide with the band's Electric Theatre Tour which began in Newcastle on 15 April 1989. As such, the 7" triple pack issued by EMI in the UK included tour dates on the artwork.

The song's first week of release was complicated because the original CD single was discovered to have an overlong playing time that disqualified it from some of the sales charts. The CD single was recalled two days after its release, and reissued a few days later, but for several days during the song's initial promotion, the CD was unavailable in shops.

Despite the collectibility of this release, it reached no higher in the charts than #30 in the UK, #14 in Italy, #72 in the US and #88 in Canada.

== Music video ==
The video for "Do You Believe in Shame?" was filmed by the Chinese director Chen Kaige, who later directed critically acclaimed films such as Farewell My Concubine. It was set in New York City, and shows the three original members of Duran Duran in separate storylines.

At the end of the music video, a long line of dominoes can be seen falling in succession by forming a question mark which is akin to the single's sleeve where all of the members of Duran Duran are seen in a little room located in an apartment building.

== B-sides, bonus tracks and remixes ==
In lieu of a remix of the single track, EMI issued bonus material across a number of formats—triple 7″ pack, 3″ CD and limited edition numbered 10″ single.

"Official Bootleg: The LSD Edit", a previously promo-only edit of Big Thing album tracks "The Edge of America" and "Lake Shore Driving" finally had its commercial debut, "LSD" presumably an acronym for "Lake Shore Driving". The song was renamed "The Krush Brothers LSD Edit" for release on the "Do You Believe in Shame?" single.

The original Daniel Abraham mix of "Drug (It's Just a State of Mind)" also appeared on this single. John Taylor believed in this mix of "Drug" so vehemently, he has since said he almost left the band over the mishandling of the track.

Other items include an edit of Big Thing album track "Palomino" and a live version of "Notorious", recorded in Rotterdam, which was previously from the promo-only 12″ EP Duran Goes Dutch.

Also included in the pack were two spoken word pieces by Le Bon, "God (London)" and "This Is How a Road Gets Made", recorded and produced by John Jones. They were used during the tour as intros to the band coming on stage. Le Bon swears in "God (London)" and it was released in two versions, censored and non-censored.

== Formats and track listings ==
=== 7″: EMI / Triple Pack United Kingdom ===
EMI / DDA 12 (Simon Le Bon picture sleeve)

1. "Do You Believe in Shame?" – 4:23
2. "The Krush Brothers LSD Edit" – 3:30 [a.k.a. "Edge of America" (The Krush Brothers LSD Edit)]

EMI / DDB 12 (Nick Rhodes picture sleeve)

1. "Do You Believe in Shame?" – 4:23
2. "God (London)" – 1:36
3. "This Is How a Road Gets Made" – 0:47
4. "Palomino" (edit) – 3:30

EMI / DDC 12 (John Taylor picture sleeve)

1. "Do You Believe in Shame?" – 4:23
2. "Drug (It's Just a State of Mind)" (original version) – 4:18 ["Daniel Abraham Mix"]

=== 10″: EMI / 10 DD 12 United Kingdom ===
1. "Do You Believe in Shame?" – 4:23
2. "The Krush Brothers LSD Edit" – 3:30 [a.k.a. "Edge of America" (The Krush Brothers LSD Edit)]
3. "Notorious" (live) – 4:06 [recorded live at the Ahoy, Rotterdam, 7 May 1987]

=== 7″: Capitol / B-44337 United States ===
1. "Do You Believe in Shame?" – 4:23
2. "The Krush Brothers LSD Edit" – 3:30 [a.k.a. "Edge of America" (The Krush Brothers LSD Edit)]

=== 12″: Capitol / V-15456 United States ===
1. "Do You Believe in Shame?" – 4:23
2. "The Krush Brothers LSD Edit" – 3:30 [a.k.a. "Edge of America" (The Krush Brothers LSD Edit)]
3. "Notorious" (live) – 4:06 [recorded live at the Ahoy, Rotterdam, 7 May 1987]
4. "Drug (It's Just a State of Mind)" (original version) – 4:18 ["Daniel Abraham Mix"]

=== 3″ CD: EMI / CD DD 12 United Kingdom ===
1. "Do You Believe in Shame?" – 4:25
2. "The Krush Brothers LSD Edit" – 3:30 [a.k.a. "Edge of America" (The Krush Brothers LSD Edit)]
3. "Notorious" (live) – 4:16 [recorded live at the Ahoy, Rotterdam, 7 May 1987]
4. "God (London)" – 1:40
5. "This Is How a Road Gets Made" – 0:49
- Released on 3" CD like the other two Big Thing singles.
- Contains the censored version of "God (London)", bleeping the profanity.
- The same tracks also appeared on a US 3" CD C3-44337-2 (includes the uncensored "God (London)")

=== CD: The Singles 1986–1995 box set ===
1. "Do You Believe in Shame?" – 4:25
2. "The Krush Brothers LSD Edit" – 3:32 [a.k.a. "Edge of America" (The Krush Brothers LSD Edit)]
3. "God (London)" – 1:40
4. "This Is How a Road Gets Made" – 0:49
5. "Palomino" (edit) – 3:30
6. "Drug" (original version) – 4:18 ["Daniel Abraham Mix"]
7. "Notorious" (live) – 4:16 [recorded live at the Ahoy, Rotterdam, 7 May 1987]

== Charts ==
=== Weekly charts ===
Chart (1989)	Peak position
Canada Top Singles (RPM)	88
Ireland (IRMA)	17
Italy (Musica e dischi)	14
Italy Airplay (Music & Media)	1
UK Singles (Official Charts)	30
US Billboard Hot 100	72

== Covers ==
Allison Iraheta and her band Halo Circus recorded a cover version for the 2014 compilation album Making Patterns Rhyme: A Tribute to Duran Duran.

== Other appearances ==
The song has also appeared on the soundtrack to the film Tequila Sunrise (1988).

== Personnel ==
Duran Duran

- Simon Le Bon – vocals
- Nick Rhodes – keyboards
- John Taylor – bass guitar

Additional musicians

- Warren Cuccurullo – guitar
- Sterling Campbell – drums
- Steve Ferrone – drums
- Daniel Abraham – primitive guitar

Technical

- Jonathan Elias – co-producer
- Daniel Abraham – co-producer and mixer
