= The Heart of Justice =

1992 American TV movie

- Film poster
- Genre: Crime; Drama; Thriller
- Written by: Keith Reddin
- Directed by: Bruno Barreto
- Starring: Eric Stoltz; Jennifer Connelly; Dermot Mulroney; Dennis Hopper
- Theme music composer: Jonathan Elias
- Country of origin: United States
- Original language: English

Production
- Executive producer: Michael Brandman
- Producer: Donald P. Borchers
- Cinematography: Declan Quinn
- Editor: Bruce Cannon
- Running time: 88 minutes
- Production companies: Amblin Television; Brandman Productions; Planet Productions; Turner Pictures

Original release
- Network: TNT
- Release: February 20, 1993

The Heart of Justice, is a 1992 television film starring Eric Stoltz, Jennifer Connelly, Dermot Mulroney and Dennis Hopper. It was Vincent Price's final on-screen performance before his death in 1993.

== Plot summary ==
A desperate young man shoots five bullets into a well known successful author as he leaves a New York club and then turns the gun on himself. Questions surround this seemingly senseless murder and investigative reporter David Leader is assigned the case. David soon meets Emma Burgess, a beautiful woman who is directly involved in this case as David. She had an incestuous relationship with her brother Elliot (the gunman). Emma had also been involved with Austin Blair, the author whom Elliot believed, had revealed their "family" secret in his latest novel. As David tries to piece together the story he finds himself drawn into the inner circle of the wealthy Burgess family.

== Cast ==
- Eric Stoltz as David Leader
- Jennifer Connelly as Emma Burgess
- Dermot Mulroney as Elliot Burgess
- Dennis Hopper as Austin Blair
- Harris Yulin as Keneally
- Paul Teschke as Alex
- Vincent Price as Reggie Shaw
- William H. Macy as Booth
- Bradford Dillman as Mr. Burgess
- Joanna Miles as Mrs. Burgess
- Katherine LaNasa as Hannah
- Keith Reddin as Simon
