= Skin Trade (song) =

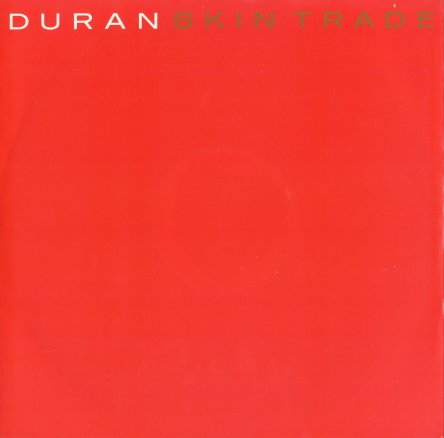

Single by Duran Duran

from the album Notorious
- B-side: "We Need You"
- Released: January 1987 (US); 9 February 1987 (UK)
- Recorded: June–September 1986
- Studio: Abbey Road (London)
- Genre: White soul; R&B; funk
- Length: 5:58 (album version); 4:27 (radio version); 7:20 (S.O.S. dub); 7:45 (Stretch mix); 8:09 (Parisian mix)
- Label: EMI; Capitol
- Songwriters: Simon Le Bon; John Taylor; Nick Rhodes
- Producer: Nile Rodgers

Duran Duran singles chronology
"Notorious" (1986)	"Skin Trade" (1987)	"Meet El Presidente" (1987)

Music video
- "Skin Trade" on YouTube

Alternative cover
- The original, banned sleeve

"Skin Trade" is a song by the English pop rock band Duran Duran, released in January 1987 as the second single from their fourth studio album, Notorious (1986). It showcased a drastic change from their previous singles, with R&B influences, brass solos and funk guitar riffs, in addition to a Prince-style falsetto from lead vocalist Simon Le Bon.

"Skin Trade" was praised by contemporary critics, but was the first commercial failure in Duran Duran's career, stalling at number 22 on the UK singles chart and at number 39 on the Billboard Hot 100, but was a success in other countries. It nonetheless continues to see radio airplay and was commended by critics as one of the best songs from Notorious, with praise for the production and performances.

== Background ==
"Skin Trade" marked a mature change in the sound of Duran Duran, moving away from their soft synth-pop style into a more urban sound. A prominent brass section played by the Borneo Horns was featured, with elements of funk guitar and scaled-back synths.

Lead singer Simon Le Bon also sang in a Prince-style falsetto. He later admitted he was inspired by the Rolling Stones' Mick Jagger on their song "Emotional Rescue". Steve Ferrone and Warren Cuccurullo played the drums and lead guitars respectively, with producer Nile Rodgers also playing some rhythm guitar on the single.

== Packaging ==
Two covers for the "Skin Trade" single exist. The original French and Canadian "bum" sleeves for "Skin Trade" with gold lettering for the titles were withdrawn after retailers refused to distribute it due to its depiction of nudity. This was the band's intended sleeve design but only Canada and France were able to use it.

EMI would respond to this by creating a "clean cover" which was a simple red sleeve. Copies of the recalled "bum" sleeve exist, but are now rare collector's items.

== Critical reception ==
"Skin Trade" received positive reviews from contemporary critics upon its release, with some drawing comparisons to Prince. Cash Box praised Le Bon's "Prince like vocal" and Nile Rodgers' production calling the song, "the most compelling, funky moment of the band's Notorious LP". William Shaw of Smash Hits called the song "fairly magnificent" and praised Le Bon's performance. The single release was "Single of the Forthnight" in Smash Hits, "Duran Duran are awesomely clever. Just when there are a rash of Duran Duran imitations nudging into the charts, they come up with a song that doesn't sound like the old Duran Duran at all, but sounds much, much better", Lola Borg wrote. "They've been taking lessons from Prince as this is seriously um... funky, and they sleaze and grind their way through some interesting, dodgy-sounding lyrics".

Retrospectively, some have called it a mature standout in Duran Duran's discography. AllMusic journalist Donald A. Guarisco wrote that, "Duran Duran's recording is fuelled by funky but gently layered guitar textures and subtle drum work that push its groove along, plus some atmospheric synth textures on the chorus. The result was a perfect blend of slow-dance textures and adult social critique."

John Bergstrom of PopMatters, despite criticizing the songwriting on the album lauded the song as, "arguably among the best Duran Duran have ever released, putting familiar appeals to fame and sexuality in a new, genuinely funky context."

The Guardian music journalist Alexis Petridis ranked it as one of Duran Duran's greatest songs, writing: "Skin Trade sounds more impressive now than it did on release. It’s hard not to admire the boldness of the sonic shift; the sleazy ambience works."

== Commercial performance ==
"Skin Trade" was Duran Duran's first commercial failure as it stalled at number 22 on the UK Singles Chart and number 39 in the Billboard Hot 100. Not only did it fail to replicate the success of "Notorious": it became the first single since their initial releases that failed to at least break the Top 10 in either side of the Atlantic. It was a commercial success in some countries, such as Belgium where it reached number 9 on the charts, number 10 in Italy, and 14 in the Netherlands. Poor sales of both the Notorious album and "Skin Trade" would consequently shadow the band for years to come until the success of 1992's "Ordinary World" as Duran Duran struggled to maintain their mainstream success in the late 1980s.

== Music video ==
The video for "Skin Trade" was directed by duo Peter Kagan and Paula Greif who previously filmed the video for "Notorious" and premiered on MTV in March 1987. Footage of the three-piece band performing was treated with a rotoscope, adding vivid colors to details like a person's eyes or jewelry. Like so many other Duran Duran videos, "Skin Trade" included a female, with supermodel Tatjana Patitz's image being rotoscoped and her dancing figure was superimposed on several different vividly colored abstract backgrounds. Drummer Steve Ferrone and guitarist Warren Cuccurullo, who would later become a full member of the band in 1989 after the tour supporting Big Thing, appear in the video but are rarely seen.

== B-side and remixes ==
The B-side to "Skin Trade", "We Need You" was the only original B-side released during the Notorious era, being written and recorded in 1986 while the band awaited the return of guitarist Andy Taylor who left the band by the time the single was released. It was the first recording to feature just the three remaining members of Duran Duran: Simon Le Bon, Nick Rhodes, and John Taylor.

Two further mixes of "Skin Trade" (the "S.O.S. dub" and the "Parisian" mix) were completed, but were initially not released commercially. They appeared on the US and UK 12″ promos, backed with remixes of their next single "Meet El Presidente". The "Parisian" mix was also released on the exclusive Master Mixes EP before seeing its commercial release on the UK and US 3″ CD singles for "All She Wants Is".

== Formats and track listings ==
=== 7″: EMI / TRADE 1 United Kingdom ===
1. "Skin Trade" (radio cut) – 4:26
2. "We Need You" – 2:49

=== 12″: EMI / 12 TRADE 1 United Kingdom ===
1. "Skin Trade" (Stretch mix) – 7:36
2. "Skin Trade" (album version) – 5:58
3. "We Need You" – 2:49
- These tracks were also released on cassette (TC TRADE 1) in a video style box with the original, banned sleeve.

=== 7″: Capitol / B-5670 United States ===
1. "Skin Trade" (radio cut) – 4:26
2. "We Need You" – 2:49

=== 12″: Capitol / V-15274 United States ===
1. "Skin Trade" (Stretch mix) – 7:36
2. "Skin Trade" (album version) – 5:58
3. "We Need You" – 2:49

=== CD: The Singles 1986–1995 box set ===
1. "Skin Trade" (radio cut) – 4:25
2. "We Need You" – 2:49
3. "Skin Trade" (Stretch mix) – 7:36
4. "Skin Trade" (album version) – 5:58

== Personnel ==
Duran Duran

- Simon Le Bon – vocals
- John Taylor – bass guitar
- Nick Rhodes – keyboards

Additional musicians

- Warren Cuccurullo – guitars
- Nile Rodgers – guitars
- Steve Ferrone – drums
- The Borneo Horns – horns
- Curtis King – background vocals
- Brenda White-King – background vocals
- Tessa Niles – background vocals
- Cindy Mizelle – background vocals

Technical

- Nile Rodgers – producer
- Duran Duran – producer
- Daniel Abraham – remixer, engineer and mixer
- Larry Levan – remixer ("Stretch" mix)

== Charts ==
=== Weekly charts ===
Weekly chart performance for "Skin Trade"
Chart (1987)	Peak position
Belgium (Ultratop 50 Flanders)	9
Ireland (IRMA)	10
Italy (Musica e dischi)	8
Italy Airplay (Music & Media)	14
Netherlands (Dutch Top 40)	14
Netherlands (Single Top 100)	11
New Zealand (Recorded Music NZ)	36
Spain (AFYVE)	10
Spain Airplay (Top 40 Radio)	21
UK Singles (Official Charts)	22
US Billboard Hot 100	39
West Germany (GfK)	35

=== Year-end charts ===
Year-end chart performance for "Skin Trade"
Chart (1987)	Position
Belgium (Ultratop Flanders)	89
