= Notorious (Duran Duran album) =

1986 studio album by Duran Duran

Studio album by Duran Duran
- Released: 24 November 1986
- Recorded: June–September 1986
- Studios: West Side (London); AIR (London); Abbey Road (London); Skyline (New York City)
- Genre: Funk rock
- Length: 46:56
- Labels: EMI; Capitol
- Producers: Duran Duran; Nile Rodgers

Duran Duran chronology
Arena (1984)	Notorious (1986)	Big Thing (1988)

Singles from Notorious
- 1. "Notorious" Released: 15 October 1986; 2. "Skin Trade" Released: January 1987; 3. "Meet El Presidente" Released: 13 April 1987

Notorious is the fourth studio album by the English pop rock band Duran Duran, released on 24 November 1986 by EMI Records. Produced by the band with Nile Rodgers, its musical style differed from the band's previous albums with a funk rock sound. It is the first album to feature the band as a trio with singer Simon Le Bon, keyboardist Nick Rhodes and bassist John Taylor, as drummer Roger Taylor and guitarist Andy Taylor both left by the time the album was released. Andy Taylor would later be replaced by former Missing Persons guitarist Warren Cuccurullo, who completed recording parts of the album in addition to Rodgers and session drummer Steve Ferrone.

Notorious peaked at number 16 on the UK Albums Chart and number 12 on the Billboard 200. It has been certified Gold in the UK (for sales in excess of 100,000 copies) and Platinum in the United States for sales in excess of 1,000,000 copies. The album yielded three singles: the title track, "Skin Trade", and "Meet El Presidente". The song "Notorious" was a worldwide success, reaching number seven on the UK Singles Chart and number two on the US Billboard Hot 100. Despite selling far fewer copies than their previous releases, the album received positive reviews from critics, who praised the band's maturing sound and production.

== Background and recording ==
Following the success of their previous album Seven and the Ragged Tiger and its subsequent world tour, Duran Duran planned to take a break for a year but all the band members ended up working on two side projects, the Power Station and Arcadia, which were both moderate successes. The band would regroup in 1985 to record the song "A View to a Kill" for the James Bond film of the same name and performed at the Live Aid charity concert in July of the same year, which proved to be the last time all original members played together.

By the time it came to record the new album at the beginning of 1986, drummer Roger Taylor had quit the group, citing exhaustion and overwhelmed with the band's success. The remaining three members would continue to work on the album, with producer Nile Rodgers of Chic also contributing to guitar and drummer Steve Ferrone who worked with the Average White Band, Chaka Khan and Scritti Politti.

=== Andy Taylor's departure and Warren Cuccurullo ===
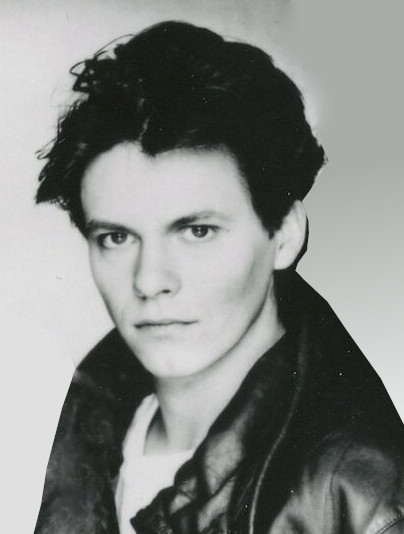
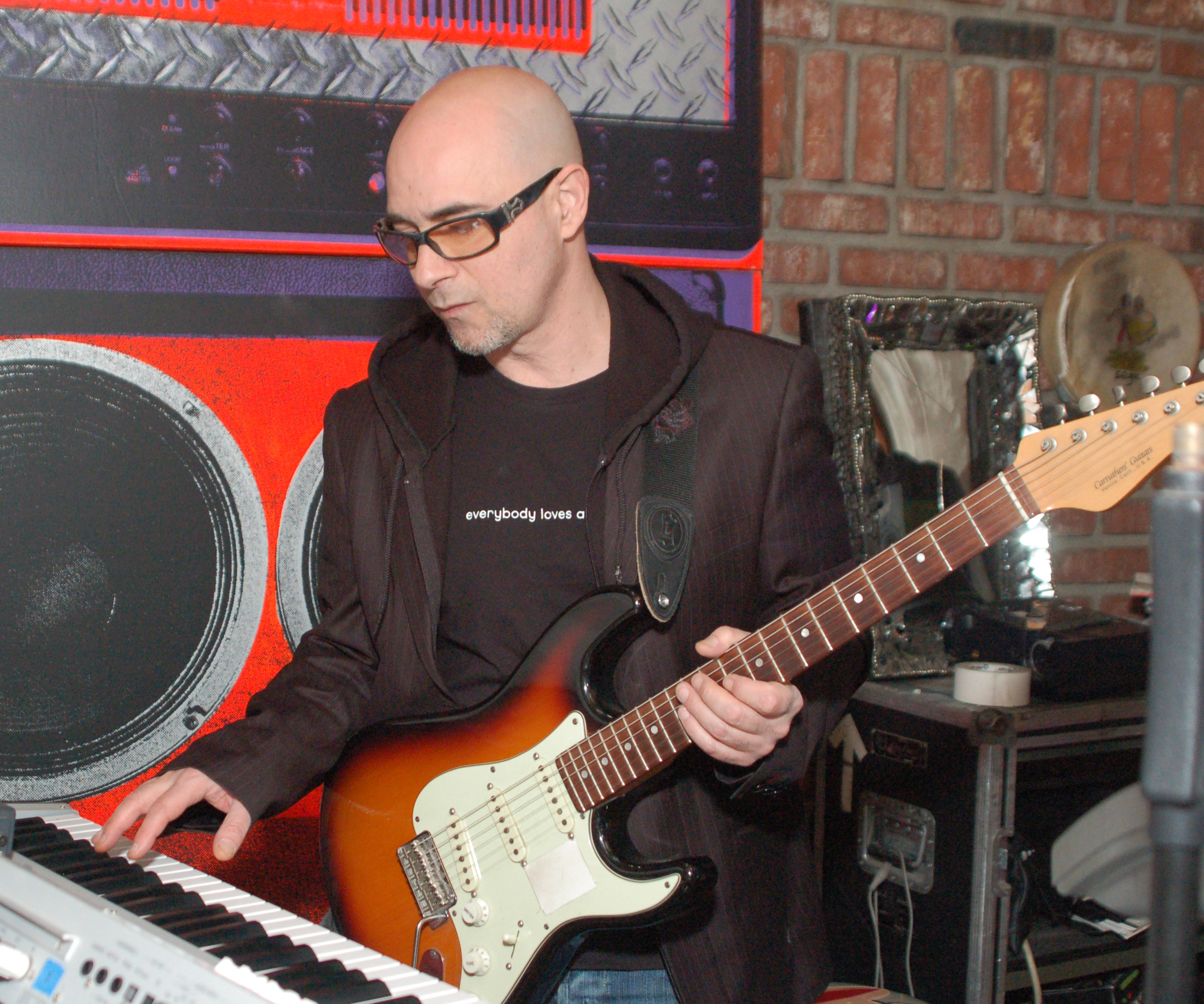
The recording sessions for Notorious saw the departure of founding guitarist Andy Taylor (left, in 1983), who was replaced by Warren Cuccurullo (right, in 2009).

Guitarist Andy Taylor was expected to record with the band in early stages of the album. He did not show up when the sessions began and tensions arose when the band realized the guitarist was in Los Angeles planning his own solo career and was not satisfied with the musical direction the band members were going for. The recording sessions would be interrupted by a legal battle between both parties. After several months however, the band agreed to let him go but Taylor would play on several tracks before his departure. Andy would write in his autobiography, Wild Boy: My Life in Duran Duran about his final studio session. "I plugged in my guitar, played a few tracks with the engineer in order to honour my contractual obligations and then left to phone my lawyer. It was over."

In a 1986 interview, Andy Taylor stated, "When I got to the studio, they had already started. It didn't matter. I just didn't want to be in the band anymore. They were playing this dance and R&B style of music and I wanted to play rock 'n' roll. I left on good terms with them. I don't feel any hostility." Keyboardist Nick Rhodes reflected on the circumstances saying, "When John went on the Power Station tour with him, he felt they were growing up. I went over to Los Angeles in January to see Andy to talk about the new album and try out new ideas. It was very uneasy. Anyway, it doesn't matter. I think the fact was we came to do the album the three of us really wanted to do and he didn't. He wanted to make a solo record. I just wish he told us a bit earlier.

During the sessions, Taylor began hanging out with members of American rock band Missing Persons which had broken up. Guitarist Warren Cuccurullo would eventually contact the band several times, being initially rebuffed. When the album reached the mixing stage, the band would invite Warren over and was hired as a replacement, in which he contributed on several tracks on the album. Cuccurullo would eventually become a full-time member of the band in 1989 after their tour supporting their follow-up album Big Thing.

== Composition ==
=== Music ===
Given the experience the band members had on their side projects, there was a massive change in the musical style of Duran Duran. The sound of Notorious was an obvious direction, especially due to the fact that the band's last two hit singles "The Wild Boys" and the James Bond theme "A View to a Kill" were "edgier" but were worldwide successes nevertheless. The band wanted to distance themselves away from their synth-pop approach and explore a "funkier urban" sound. Rhodes mentioned that the band wanted to focus more on their music and less on their image. "On the last tour, the audience was too loud in some places," Rhodes said. "The screaming little girls tend to make their way to the front of the stage and make a lot of noise. We like the young fans. But it would be nice if they were a little quieter."

Rhodes further elaborated on the musical change saying, "I think Notorious is quite typical on some of the dance tracks on the album, but it's certainly nothing like any of the old stuff", while lead singer Simon Le Bon stated that the involvement of Nile Rodgers helped with the musical direction the band was looking for. Bassist John Taylor and the rest of the band were also influenced by disco band Chic, in which Rodgers was the guitarist. The band also commented that the writing process was easier, in comparison with the tense recording sessions of Seven and the Ragged Tiger. "John, particularly has had a very funky nerve," said Le Bon. "He was the one who really pushed to get Nile. Nick would probably declare that he did. I was just happy to get along with anybody just to get some music down."

=== Lyrics ===
Similar to their previous works, the lyrical content on Notorious focused on certain topics. Due to the band's determination to move to a more sophisticated style, the results were more mature such as the negative aspects of the press ("Notorious"), work exploitation ("Skin Trade"), band tensions ("Vertigo (Do the Demolition)", manipulation ("So Misled"), and political intrigue ("Meet El Presidente"). The band named several tracks after Alfred Hitchcock films, such as Notorious, Vertigo and Rope (the original title for "Hold Me").

Rhodes and Le Bon said that the writing for the album was easier in comparison to the tension and hysteria-filled sessions of Seven and the Ragged Tiger. Nile Rodgers said of composing the title track, "[...] 'Notorious' is basically James Brown soul-power. That's when I started to groove and started playing along with it. And Nick Rhodes went, 'Wow! A D-minor 6th. That's such a great chord. We got to write that into a song."

== Release and promotion ==
The evolving sound and mature direction of Duran Duran was seen as a major turning point in the band's commercial prospects. Several other factors regarding the lackluster performance of Notorious included the band members dismissing their managers, the Berrow brothers and acting as their own management. In June 1986, EMI fired its president and went through a reconstruction with the label losing interest in the band in favor of new artists. This, combined with the hiatus the band took would alienate much of the band's core fanbase as the mature approach would leave behind the light synth-pop of their earlier releases.

Notorious was released on 24 November 1986. The album would peak at number 16 in the UK Albums Chart and number 12 on the Billboard 200. It would be certified platinum in the US on January 20, 1987, and has sold over 1,000,000 copies there. Despite this, Notorious was seen as a commercial failure because it did not replicate the same success as their previous albums. The lead single, "Notorious", was a commercial success, reaching number 7 in the UK Singles Chart and number 2 in the Billboard Hot 100 and saw heavy rotation on MTV. "Skin Trade", the album's second single, stalled at number 22 in the UK and at number 39 on the American Top 40, a first for the band since their early releases. The third single, "Meet El Presidente", was remixed to capitalise on the growing "Miami dance" scene, but it only reached number 24 in the UK and number 70 in the US. "A Matter of Feeling" was considered as another potential single, before being released as a promotional single in Brazil. The commercial underperformance of both the album and its subsequent singles would ultimately shadow Duran Duran for years to come until the success of 1993's "Ordinary World".

== Critical reception ==
=== Contemporary reviews ===
Professional ratings
Review scores
Source	Rating
The Philadelphia Inquirer	1/5 stars
Record Mirror	1/5 stars
Smash Hits	8¾/10
Sounds	3/5 stars

Notorious received mixed reviews from critics. Of those that were positive, critics praised the band's newfound maturity and improved songwriting. Jon Pareles of The New York Times wrote, "Duran Duran's newfound disillusionment may mark a step toward maturity...they managed to catch a trend on the upswing, perhaps Notorious suggests that for late 1980s grit and pessimism is coming into style." William Shaw of Smash Hits also praised the album calling it, "the best LP Duran Duran recorded... I know that Duran LPs of the past have been hugely popular but, until now, they were never all that good," and concludes that "But on Notorious, blimey! Duran seem to have found themselves."

Mark Coleman of Rolling Stone wrote, "Notorious is by far the group's most consistently listenable work. But while it doesn't plunge to past depths, neither does it scale the giddy heights of irresistible hit singles like 'The Reflex'." Chris Williams of Los Angeles Times said of the production, "Nile Rodgers, is no miracle worker—he doesn't leave a stamp on his production efforts with meager artists so much as the veneer of an airbrush—but his studio prowess is punchy enough to make the usual ponderous material a tad easier to swallow. Nick Rhodes' omnipresent layers of synthesizers have more character and variety this time around."

Notorious was ranked the sixth best album of 1986 in the seventh annual Smash Hits poll, votes for which were held before the album's release, something which Neil Tennant of the Pet Shop Boys (who were in fifth place) credited to Duran Duran's fanatical fanbase. John Taylor quipped that "if anyone had actually heard the album, we'd have come first."

=== Retrospective reviews ===
Professional ratings
Review scores
Source	Rating
AllMusic	2.5/5 stars
Classic Pop	4/5 stars
The Encyclopedia of Popular Music	3/5 stars
MusicHound Rock	1/5 stars
PopMatters	6/10
Rolling Stone	3.5/5 stars
The Rolling Stone Album Guide	3/5 stars
Spin Alternative Record Guide	5/10

Retrospective reviews remain similarly mixed. Mike DeGagne of AllMusic criticised the songwriting, "Beneath Duran Duran's attempts at trying to sound musically devious, mysterious, and slightly seductive, the tracks fail to bear enough weight in order to be effective all the way through," and concludes "the provocative, nightclub brand of martini-sipping pop that does surface is meritorious to a certain extent, felt mostly in the album's two biggest tracks." John Bergstrom of PopMatters also criticised the songwriting as not "as consistent as the production. It also showcases Duran Duran's, and Rhodes' in particular, underrated ability to summon a satisfyingly ethereal atmosphere. Other tracks, though, suffer from lack of distinction. Duran Duran always struggled to supplement their singles with strong album material, and Notorious does at times reveal the stress and tension of the period in unflattering ways."

Caryn Ganz of Rolling Stone, who reviewed the 2010 reissue, summarized the album as catching "Duran Duran in transition and that it "showed that Duran had lost some of the worldbeating hook savvy that made them famous," but that it "still packs funk-lite charms, such as producer Nile Rodgers' slinky guitars and the soulful 'Skin Trade.'" She notes the remastered version "crisps up the title track and unearths some comically dated remixes," but maintains the real draw is a bonus DVD " featuring a gauzily shot 1987 show." Classic Pop, in an article on the making of Notorious, stated that "Skin Trade", "Vertigo" and "American Science" have a "loose funkiness which harked back to the disco/funk sound Rodgers had pioneered with Chic," while retaining Duran Duran's identity.

== Track listing ==
All tracks are written by John Taylor, Nick Rhodes and Simon Le Bon.

Side one
No.	Title	Length
1.	"Notorious"	4:18
2.	"American Science"	4:43
3.	"Skin Trade"	5:57
4.	"A Matter of Feeling"	5:58
5.	"Hold Me"	4:33

Side two
No.	Title	Length
6.	"Vertigo (Do the Demolition)"	4:44
7.	"So Misled"	4:04
8.	"Meet El Presidente"	4:21
9.	"Winter Marches On"	3:26
10.	"Proposition"	5:03
Total length:		46:56

2010 remastered edition bonus tracks: Single versions and B-sides
No.	Title	Length
11.	"We Need You"	2:54
12.	"Notorious" (45 mix)	4:01
13.	"Skin Trade" (radio cut)	4:28
14.	"Meet El Presidente" (7" remix)	3:38

2010 remastered edition bonus disc: Mixes
No.	Title	Length
1.	"Notorious" (extended mix)	5:18
2.	"Meet El Presidente" (Presidential Suite mix)	7:15
3.	"Skin Trade" (Parisian mix)	8:08
4.	"American Science" (Chemical Reaction mix)	7:45
5.	"Vertigo (Do the Demolition)" (Mantronix mix)	6:34
6.	"Skin Trade" (Stretch mix)	7:44
7.	"Notoriousaurus Rex"	8:19

2010 remastered edition bonus disc: Duran Goes Dutch EP (recorded at the Ahoy, Rotterdam, 7 May 1987)
No.	Title	Length
8.	"Notorious" (live)	4:15
9.	"Vertigo (Do the Demolition)" (live)	5:28
10.	"New Religion" (live)	5:50
11.	"American Science" (live)	5:00
12.	"Hungry Like the Wolf" (live)	5:07

2010 remastered deluxe edition bonus DVD: Working for the Skin Trade (live during the Strange Behaviour Tour in Rio de Janeiro)
No.	Title	Length
1.	"Intro"
2.	"A View to a Kill"
3.	"Notorious"
4.	"New Religion"
5.	"Vertigo (Do the Demolition)"
6.	"The Chauffeur"
7.	"Save a Prayer"
8.	"Skin Trade"
9.	"Hungry Like the Wolf"
10.	"Wild Boys"
11.	"Credits"

2010 remastered deluxe edition bonus DVD: The videos
No.	Title	Length
12.	"Notorious"
13.	"Skin Trade"
14.	"Meet El Presidente"

2010 remastered deluxe edition bonus DVD: Top of the Pops
No.	Title	Length
15.	"Notorious" (6/11/86)

=== 2010 digital-only releases ===
Remix EP
No.	Title	Length
1.	"Skin Trade" (S.O.S dub)	7:19
2.	"Meet El Presidente" (Meet El Beat)	5:33
3.	"American Science" (Meltdown dub)	7:29
4.	"Vertigo (Do the Demolition)" (B-boy mix)	6:04
5.	"Notorious" (Latin Rascals mix)	6:24

Live at the Beacon Theater, New York City, 31 August 1987
No.	Title	Length
1.	"Introduction/A View to a Kill"
2.	"Notorious"
3.	"American Science"
4.	"Union of the Snake"
5.	"Vertigo (Do the Demolition)"
6.	"New Religion"
7.	"Meet El Presidente"
8.	"Election Day"
9.	"Some Like It Hot"
10.	"The Chauffeur"
11.	"Skin Trade"
12.	"Hold Me" (incorporating "Dance to the Music")
13.	"Is There Something I Should Know?"
14.	"Hungry Like the Wolf"

== Personnel ==
Duran Duran

- Simon Le Bon – lead vocals
- Nick Rhodes – keyboards
- John Taylor – bass guitar, background vocals and guitar on track 11

Technical

- Nile Rodgers – production
- Duran Duran – production
- Daniel Abraham – engineering, mixing
- Bob Ludwig – mastering

Artwork

- John Swannell – photography
- Christy Turlington – cover model
- Frank Olinsky – design

Additional musicians

- Steve Ferrone – drums on all tracks
- Andy Taylor – guitar on tracks 2, 4–6 (left the band during recording)
- Nile Rodgers – guitar on tracks 1–4 & 7–10
- Warren Cuccurullo – guitar on tracks 2, 3, 5, 6 & 9
- Mac Gollehon
- Jimmy Maelen
- The Borneo Horns
- Curtis King Jr. – additional vocals
- Brenda White-King – additional vocals
- Tessa Niles – additional vocals
- Cindy Mizelle – additional vocals

== Charts ==
=== Weekly charts ===
Weekly chart performance for Notorious
Chart (1986–1987)	Peak position
Australian Albums (Kent Music Report)	30
Austrian Albums (Ö3 Austria)	20
Canada Top Albums/CDs (RPM)	19
Dutch Albums (Album Top 100)	11
European Albums (Music & Media)	12
Finnish Albums (Suomen virallinen lista)	19
French Albums (IFOP)	30
German Albums (Offizielle Top 100)	22
Italian Albums (Musica e dischi)	2
New Zealand Albums (RMNZ)	15
Norwegian Albums (VG-lista)	8
Swedish Albums (Sverigetopplistan)	8
Swiss Albums (Schweizer Hitparade)	19
UK Albums (Official Charts)	16
US Billboard 200	12

Chart (2024)	Peak position
Croatian International Albums (HDU)	20
Hungarian Albums (MAHASZ)	35

=== Year-end charts ===
Year-end chart performance for Notorious
Chart (1987)	Position
European Albums (Music & Media)	54
US Billboard 200	60

== Certifications ==
Certifications for Notorious
Region	Certification	Certified units/sales
Canada (Music Canada)	Platinum	100,000^{^}
Spain (Promusicae)	Gold	50,000^{^}
United Kingdom (BPI)	Gold	100,000^{^}
United States (RIAA)	Platinum	1,000,000^{^}
^{^} Shipments figures based on certification alone.
