= Jailbait (1994 film) =

1994 American film by Rafal Zielinski

- Directed by: Rafal Zielinski
- Written by: Donald P. Borchers; Robert Vincent O'Neil; Alien Castle
- Produced by: Donald P. Borchers
- Starring: C. Thomas Howell; Renée Humphrey; Krista Errickson; David Labiosa
- Cinematography: Zoltán David
- Edited by: Paul Martin Smith
- Music by: Fritz Doddy; Jonathan Elias; Alex Lasarenko
- Production companies: Skouras Pictures; Planet Productions
- Distributed by: Paramount Home Video
- Release date: February 9, 1994
- Running time: 102 minutes
- Country: United States
- Language: English

Jailbait is a 1994 American film directed by Rafal Zielinski.

== Premise ==
Seventeen year old Kyle comes to the big city in search of her half-sister, Merci. Merci is on the run — from both the police and criminals — after being used to set up a murder. Kyle must convince a policeman, Lee Teffler, to help her find her sister.

== Cast ==
- C. Thomas Howell as Sergeant Lee Teffler
- Renée Humphrey as Kyle Bradley
- Krista Errickson as Merci Cooper
- David Labiosa as Roman Delphino
- Angel Aviles as Pizza Girl
- Ron Karabatsos as Kelso
- Dean Norris as Hershiser

== Production ==
Filming started under the direction of Alien Castle. But production was running behind schedule so he was replaced.

== Reception ==
The North County Times called it "one of those silly, quick to video jokes." Another critic said "Howell continues his slide into made-for-video oblivion."
