= Liberty Mutual =

American diversified global insurer

Liberty Mutual Group

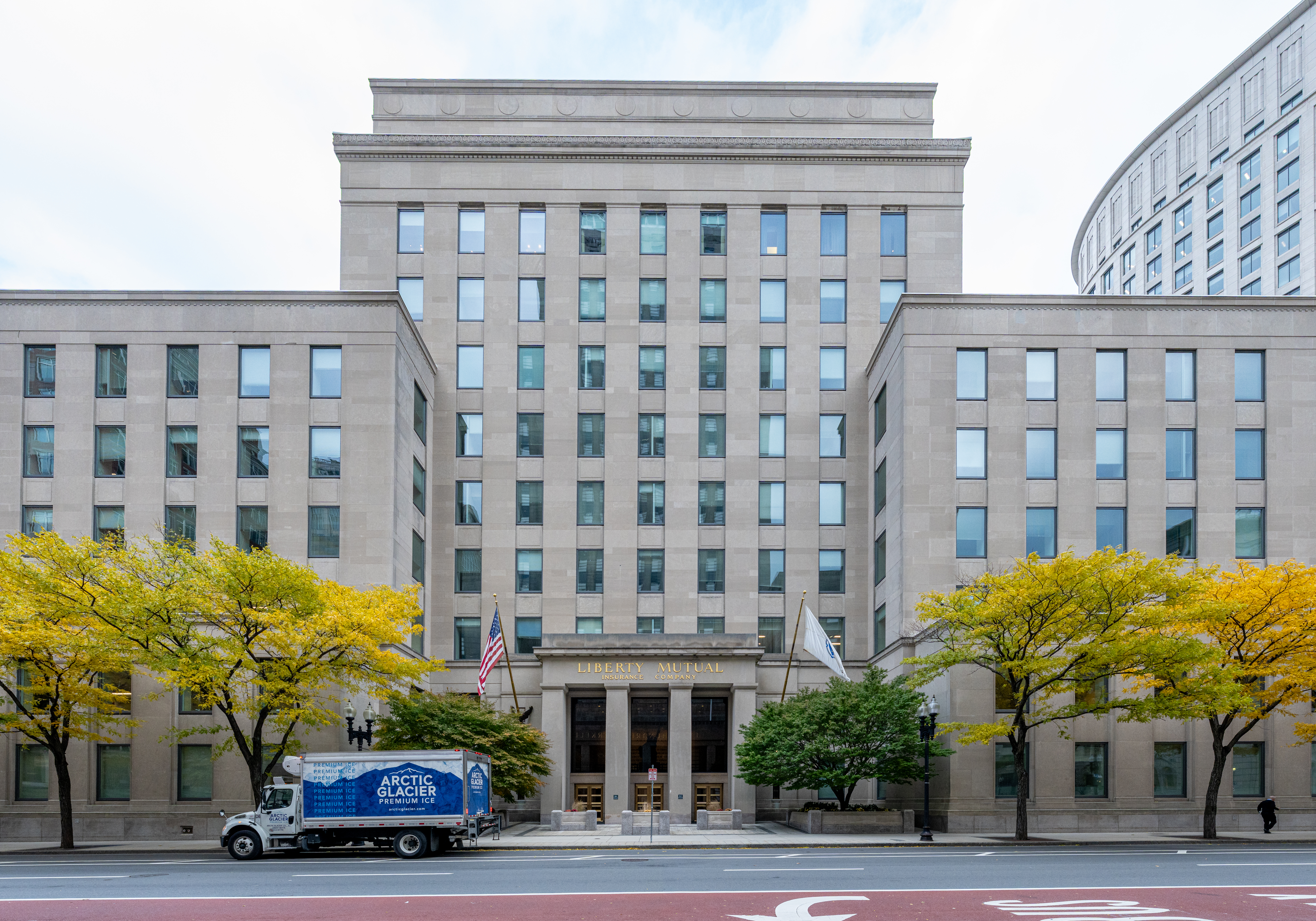
- Liberty Mutual's headquarters at 175 Berkeley Street in Boston (2025)
- Type: Private
- Industry: Insurance
- Founded: July 1, 1912; 114 years ago (as Massachusetts Employees Insurance Association)
- Headquarters: 175 Berkeley Street; Boston, Massachusetts, U.S.
- Area served: Worldwide
- Key people: Timothy M. Sweeney (president and CEO)
- Services: Property and Casualty Insurance
- Revenue: ▲$48.2 billion (2021)
- Operating income: ▼$1.282 billion (2019)
- Net income: ▲$3.068 billion (2021)
- Total assets: ▲$156.043 billion (2021)
- Total equity: ▲$27.848 billion (2021)
- Number of employees: 45,000+ (2021)
- Website: libertymutualgroup.com libertymutual.com

Liberty Mutual Insurance Company, often referred to as Liberty Mutual Insurance, is an American diversified global insurer and the ninth-largest property and casualty insurer in the world as of 2025. It ranks 95th on the Fortune 100 list of largest corporations in the United States based on 2025 revenue. Based in Boston, Massachusetts, it employs over 40,000 people across 27 countries and economies worldwide. As of December 31, 2025, Liberty Mutual Insurance had $178.163 billion in consolidated assets, $138.276 billion in consolidated liabilities and $50.465 billion in annual consolidated revenue.

The company, founded in 1912, offers a wide range of insurance products and services, including personal automobile, homeowners, renters, workers' compensation, commercial multiple peril, commercial automobile, general liability, global specialty, group disability, fire insurance and surety.

Liberty Mutual Group owns, wholly or in part, local insurance companies in Brazil, Chile, China (including Hong Kong), Colombia, Ecuador, India, Ireland, Malaysia, Portugal, Peru, Singapore, Spain, Thailand, the United Kingdom, and Vietnam. (In the UK, Liberty Mutual acts as the insurer for Countrywide Legal Indemnities).

In the United States, Liberty Mutual remains a mutual company in which policyholders holding contracts for insurance are considered shareholders in the company. However, Liberty Mutual Group's brand usually operates as a separate entity outside the United States, where a subsidiary is often created in countries where legally recognized mutual-company benefits cannot be enjoyed.

The current CEO is Timothy M. Sweeney. He succeeded his predecessor David H. Long on January 1, 2023. Long was preceded by Edmund "Ted" Kelly. Kelly was appointed CEO in 1998, and stepped down from the Board of Directors as chairman in April 2013.

== History ==
=== Early history ===
Liberty Mutual was founded in 1912 as the Massachusetts Employees Insurance Association (MEIA), following the passage of a 1911 Massachusetts law requiring employers to protect their employees with workers compensation insurance. The company was founded as a mutual company, a structure in which an insurance company is owned by its policyholders. The first branch office was opened in 1914, and later that year, the company wrote its first automobile insurance policy. The name was changed in 1917 to the Liberty Mutual Insurance Company and, through partnerships, the company began offering full-coverage auto policies.

=== Structural changes ===
In 1964, Liberty Mutual Insurance Company began offering life insurance through its Liberty Life Assurance Branch. In 2002, the company converted into its current mutual holding company structure, which would allow it to offer company's shares while remaining a mutual company. The conversion was controversial, as some policyholders believed the change would dilute their interest in the overall company, reduce their voting control, and limit their dividends. A lawsuit was filed, alleging that information provided to policyholders was misleading. Liberty Mutual settled the lawsuit in December 2001, which required additional disclosure and limited certain compensation to company officers and directors. Despite these concerns, the plan was approved by voting policyholders around November 2001. Leveraging the greater flexibility of the mutual holding company structure, Liberty Mutual transformed from a single-line, highly regional insurer to one of the world's leading property and casualty insurance companies.

=== Growth and acquisitions ===
Liberty Mutual's growth has been both organic and through acquisition. Early acquisitions were small, but Liberty Mutual has since made several large acquisitions, including the high-profile acquisition of Safeco Corporation in 2008. Liberty Mutual agreed to acquire all outstanding shares of Safeco for $68.25 per share, for a total transaction price of approximately $6.2 billion. The result of this activity was an increase in revenue from $6 billion to over $30 billion in 12 years. In 1999, the company purchased Wausau Insurance Cos.

Liberty Mutual created a 2006 television commercial depicting people doing good for others, reporting that the "overwhelming" positive response led to its decision to create the website The Responsibility Project. Liberty Mutual is the sole corporate sponsor of the long-running PBS documentary series American Experience. In 2011, as part of the company's "Real America" campaign, the company introduced two new commercials featuring Sacagawea and Paul Revere.

In 2011, the company began constructing the Liberty Mutual Tower, a 22-story skyscraper as part of a headquarters expansion project. The building received its certificate of occupancy in June 2013.

In May 2017, Liberty Mutual Insurance completed its acquisition of Bermuda-based Ironshore Inc. from Fosun International Limited for $2.93 billion. In October 2019, Liberty Mutual acquired Nationale Borg, Nationale Borg Reinsurance and AmTrust Insurance Spain, which are credit and surety reinsurance subsidiaries of AmTrust Financial Services.

In July 2021, Liberty Mutual agreed to acquire State Auto Group for over $2 billion. In August 2022, Liberty Mutual acquired AmGeneral Insurance Berhad, a Malaysian insurance company.

== Organizational structure ==
=== Strategic business units ===
Liberty Mutual conducts all of its business through two strategic business units: US Retail Markets, and Global Risk Solutions.

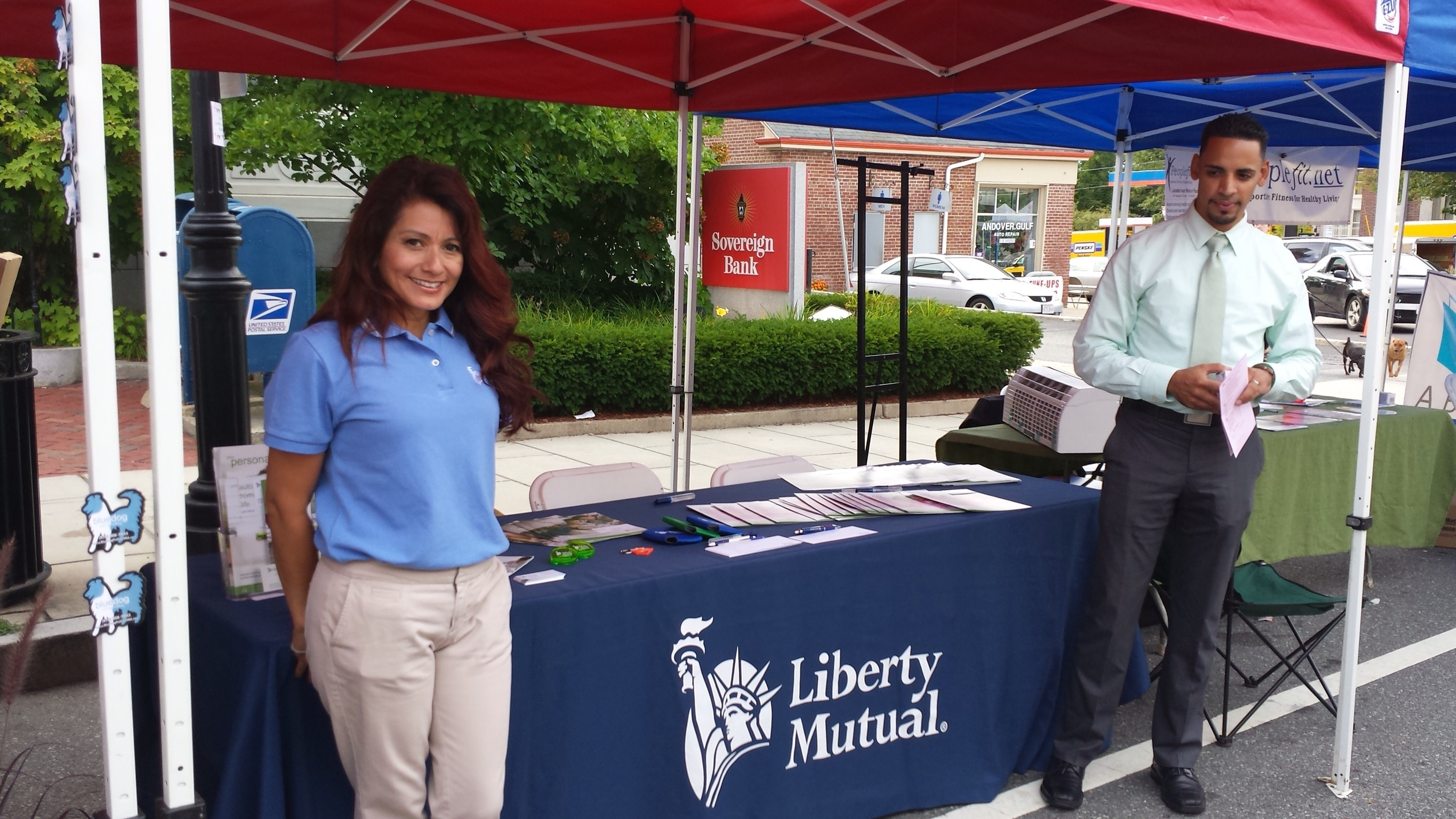
A Liberty Mutual booth at a street fair in Andover, Massachusetts

==== US Retail Markets ====
Passenger automobile, homeowners, life, annuity and other property and casualty insurance products are available via Liberty Mutual's US Consumer Markets line. These products are branded under the Liberty Mutual Insurance and Safeco names, and are distributed via a network of more than 2,300 sales professionals. Other distribution means are call centers, third-party producers and the company's own website. Over 10,000 insurance agencies across the U.S. carry Safeco-branded products.

==== Global Risk Solutions ====
The Global Risk solutions insurance line offers commercial and specialty products, such as marine, energy, aviation, professional liability and crisis management, offered through 40 Liberty International Underwriters offices worldwide. In addition, Liberty International Underwriters provides global multi-line insurance and reinsurance written on its Lloyd's Syndicate 4472 platform. Global Specialty also includes reinsurance products offered through Liberty Mutual Reinsurance.

=== Subsidiary companies ===
- Helmsman Management Services
- Liberty County Mutual Insurance Company
- Liberty International Underwriters (LIU)
- Liberty Mutual Surety (LMS)
- Liberty Mutual Reinsurance (LMR)
- Liberty Specialty Markets (LSM)
- Liberty Seguros
- Liberty Mutual Agency Corporation
  - American Fire & Casualty
  - America First Insurance
  - Colorado Casualty
  - Consolidated Insurance Company
  - Golden Eagle Insurance
  - Indiana Insurance
  - Liberty Mutual Surety
  - Liberty Surety First
  - Montgomery Insurance
  - Ohio Casualty
  - Ohio Security
  - West American
  - Peerless Insurance
  - Safeco
  - State Auto Mutual Insurance Companies (acquired in 2022)
  - Ironshore (acquired in 2016)
- Peerless Insurance

== Liberty Mutual Research Institute for Safety ==
Founded in 1954, the Liberty Mutual Research Institute for Safety studied the occupational safety and health of workers. Its scientific contributions include machine safeguarding guidelines, the Cornell-Liberty Survival Car and ergonomic guidelines that have informed the basis for national and international safety standards. More recently, the institute developed the Workplace Safety Index, an annual ranking of the leading causes of the most disabling occupational injuries in the U.S.

The institute's scientists conducted field and laboratory experiments to study the major causes of work-related injury and disability, publishing their results in peer-reviewed scientific literature. Institute findings are the basis for safety programs, recommendations and software used by Liberty Mutual loss-control consultants to help policyholders enhance worker safety. The institute's work was non-proprietary and available to the public.

The institute closed in May 2017.

== Controversy ==
In 2006, Liberty Mutual employees in the Los Angeles area sued, claiming that the company had failed to pay their overtime salaries. They attempted to certify a class-action suit, but it was dismissed on technical grounds.

In late 2012, the company won an appeal granting it the ability to not pay employees for work performed on an overtime basis. Liberty Mutual relied on an amicus brief filed on behalf of the U.S. Department of Labor. The court decided, based on the brief, that claims personnel are exempt "administrative employees" and not eligible for overtime pay. In late 2012, the Supreme Court of California depublished a contrary decision on the same issue.

In 2012 and 2013, The Boston Globe published a series of articles concerning Liberty Mutual executives' excessive compensation and weekend trips using the company's fleet of five long-range corporate jets.

== Advertising ==
In the late 2000s and early 2010s, Liberty Mutual's television advertising was created by the Boston agency Hill Holliday and carried the tagline "Responsibility. What's your policy?" In July 2012, during the London Summer Olympics, the company launched a campaign themed "Humans", which showed everyday mistakes that lead people to need insurance; its 60-second spot was voiced by Paul Giamatti.

LiMu Emu, (Note: LEE-moo EE-moo) a character that is represented using a real emu as well as through CGI, appears in some of Liberty Mutual's advertising beginning in 2019. LiMu is also accompanied by Doug, portrayed by David Hoffman, who tries to keep LiMu from acting out. Occasionally, LiMu and Doug will have a potential client in the office and type up a policy while LiMu looks on approvingly. The campaign was developed by Goodby Silverstein & Partners, the company's agency of record, and its first spots promoted Liberty Mutual's customized auto policies. On February 9, 2023, Liberty Mutual began advertising as Liberty at the end of its commercials.

Before LiMu Emu and Doug, Liberty Mutual had commercials with a customer that totaled her car, named Brad. It depicted how upset the client was to lose Brad, but then they got her a replacement and she was happy.

Various commercials are on a deck overlooking the New York Harbor with the Statue of Liberty (Liberty Enlightening the World) in the background.

Tanner Novlan has appeared in several commercials as a "struggling actor" who has trouble reciting basic facts about the company, especially its name ("Liberty Biberty" and so on). In July 2026, a puppet character named Liberty Biberty first appeared; this character is a fuzzy yellow ball with a face, wearing a crown like the Statue of Liberty's. The character was created in collaboration with Jim Henson's Creature Shop. It was conceived by David Suarez and Danny Gonzalez, the advertising creatives who had developed LiMu Emu and Doug while at Goodby Silverstein & Partners. According to The Boston Globe, the phrase "Liberty Biberty" dates to around 2019, when Novlan flubbed the company's name in an audition. In one commercial, Liberty Biberty appeared with Tanner Novlan's character. Liberty Biberty was heavily criticized by fans, even sparking a protest in Boston, Massachusetts.

Liberty Mutual has also previously used the catchphrases "Liberty Stands with You", and "Only pay for what you need".

=== Jingle ===
Liberty Mutual has a jingle repeating "Liberty" four times composed by Elias Music.
