= Countrywide Legal Indemnities =

Title insurance company based in Norwich, England

- Type: Private company
- Industry: Insurance
- Founded: 1994; 32 years ago
- Headquarters: Norwich, United Kingdom
- Products: Title insurance
- Number of employees: 90+ (2019)
- Website: cli.co.uk

Countrywide Legal Indemnities is a British title insurance company. The company is based in Norwich, Norfolk, United Kingdom. The company is an underwriting agency that works with conveyancing professionals.

Countrywide Legal Indemnities as an agent for the American insurer Liberty Mutual, which supplies legal indemnity insurance and protection to individuals and firms purchasing property or land with a title defect.

The directors of Countrywide Legal Indemnities also operate two other legal indemnity insurance companies: Isis Conveyancing Insurance Specialists and Blue Button Legal Indemnities.

== History ==
The company was founded in 1994.

In 2006, the Solicitors Journal named Countrywide as being "one of the country's leading intermediaries". In 2007, the Sunday Times listed Countrywide Legal in 34th place in its list of "Best 100 Companies".

In 1997, Countrywide became the first legal indemnity provider to be endorsed by The Law Society, providing its members with a Defective Title insurance Scheme and other related indemnities on their behalf. This endorsement lasted until 2009, and the endorsement has since passed to a competitor, First Title Insurance.

== Contaminated land and Japanese knotweed ==
Since 2001, local authorities in England have been testing land for harmful chemicals under the new environmental measures that were introduced and this has encouraged firms such as Countrywide to develop policies to protect against the threat of historical contaminated land.

Countrywide Legal Indemnities also launched a Japanese knotweed indemnity policy in 2015 due to changes on the TA6 property form, and the increasing number of properties affected by knotweed.
