= Automotive Crash Injury Research Center =

Automotive safety research facility

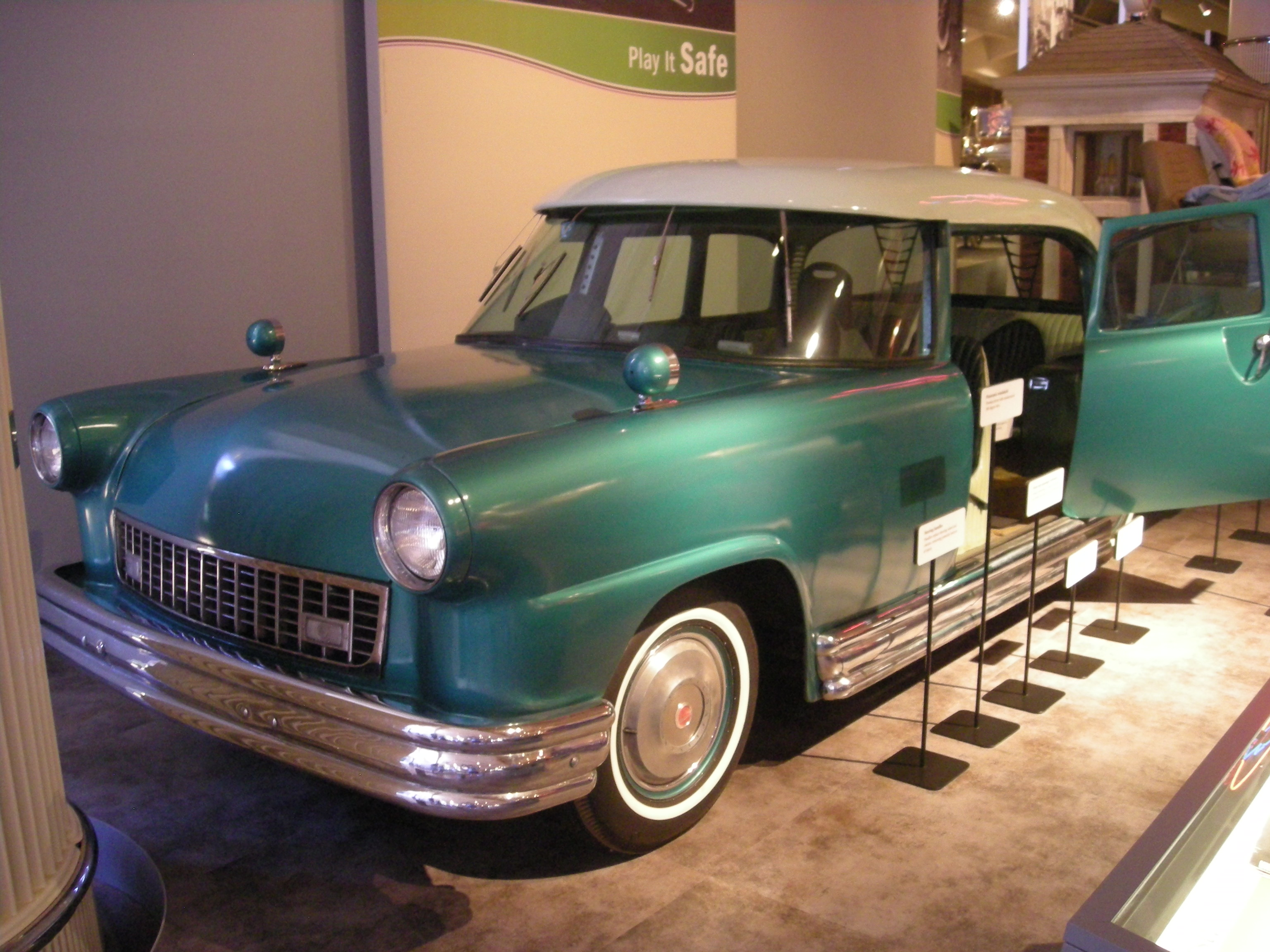
The 1957 Cornell-Liberty Safety Car on display at the Henry Ford Museum in 2012.

The Automotive Crash Injury Research Center was founded in 1952 by John O. Moore at the Cornell Aeronautical Laboratory, which spun off in 1972 as Calspan Corporation. It pioneered the use of crash testing, originally using corpses rather than dummies. The project discovered that improved door locks, energy-absorbing steering wheels, padded dashboards, and seat belts could prevent an extraordinary percentage of injuries. The project led Liberty Mutual to fund the building of a demonstration Cornell Safety Car in 1956, which received national publicity and influenced carmakers. Carmakers soon started their own crash-test laboratories and gradually adopted many of the Cornell innovations.

== See also ==
- Research at Cornell University
