= Meet El Presidente =

Single by Duran Duran

from the album Notorious
- B-side: "Vertigo (Do the Demolition)"
- Released: 13 April 1987
- Recorded: June–September 1986
- Genre: Funk rock; dance
- Length: 4:21 (album version); 3:46 (7-inch version); 5:34 (Meet El Beat); 7:16 (Presidential Suite mix)
- Label: EMI; Capitol
- Songwriters: Simon Le Bon; John Taylor; Nick Rhodes
- Producers: Nile Rodgers; Duran Duran; Mark S. Berry (single version and remixes)

Duran Duran singles chronology
"Skin Trade" (1987)	"Meet El Presidente" (1987)	"I Don't Want Your Love" (1988)

Music video
- "Meet El Presidente" on YouTube

"Meet El Presidente" is a song by the English pop rock band Duran Duran, released on 13 April 1987 as the third and final single from their fourth studio album, Notorious (1986). It reached number 24 in the UK Singles Chart and stalled at number 70 in the Billboard Hot 100.

== Background ==
The album version of the song is different from the single versions and remixes. The original key and tempo are maintained, but mixes elements of the master to differing degrees with increased percussion, stronger basslines, brass and backing vocal tracks. The idea of remixing "Meet El Presidente" came from at the behest of studio executives at Capitol Records, who intended to capitalize on the growing Latin scene in Miami and other markets in the US.

During the band's appearance on the show Soul Train on 4 April 1987, lead singer Simon Le Bon referred to the single as the "political flagship of the album". Duran Duran first performed the song on The Late Show Starring Joan Rivers on 27 February 1987, and on the final episode of British music show The Tube.

== Critical reception ==
In a contemporary review, Cash Box said it has a "smooth, sophisticated groove" and praised Le Bon's vocals saying, "he has learned to get the lower range of his voice without emotional intensity."

== Commercial performance ==
By the time "Meet El Presidente" was released as a single, interest in the Notorious album had already waned. Poor sales led the single to stall at number 24 on the UK Singles Chart and failed to chart in the Top 40 on the Billboard Hot 100, stalling at number 70. It performed slightly better in Belgium reaching number 13 and number 16 in Italy. This was Duran Duran worst charting single up until that point.

== Music video ==
"Meet El Presidente" was the third video directed for Duran Duran by duo Peter Kagan and Paula Greif. It was a basic concert video, featuring the band in their stagewear from the Strange Behaviour tour which supported the release of the Notorious album and was filmed during rehearsals, being was also filmed in black and white Super 8.

== B-side and remixes ==
"Meet El Presidente" was backed by album track "Vertigo (Do the Demolition)". This was the second single from Notorious to have an album track as B-side.

It was also the first single that Duran Duran released as a CD single, on which they included the "Meet El Beat" remix.

== Formats and track listings ==
=== 7″: EMI / Tour 1 United Kingdom ===
1. "Meet El Presidente" (7″ remix) – 3:38
2. "Vertigo (Do the Demolition)" – 4:43

=== 12″: EMI / 12 Tour 1 United Kingdom ===
1. "Meet El Presidente" – 7:12
2. "Meet El Presidente (Meet El Beat)" – 5:30
3. "Meet El Presidente" (7″ remix) – 3:38
4. "Vertigo (Do the Demolition)" – 4:43
- This 12″ is being labelled as "Meet El Presidente" on the cover.
- Also available on CD (CDTOUR 1).

=== 12″: EMI / 12 Club Tour 1 (Promo) United Kingdom ===
1. "Meet El Presidente" – 7:12
2. "Meet El Presidente (Meet El Beat)" – 5:30
3. "Meet El Presidente" (45 mix) – 3:38
4. "Skintrade" (Parisian mix) – 8:10
5. "Skintrade" (S.O.S. dub) – 7:16
- This 12″ is being labelled as "The Presidential Suite" on the cover.

=== 7″: Capitol / B-44001 United States ===
1. "Meet El Presidente" (7″ remix) – 3:38
2. "Vertigo (Do the Demolition)" – 4:43

=== 12″: Capitol / V-15294 United States ===
1. "Meet El Presidente (The Presidential Suite)" – 7:12
2. "Meet El Presidente (Meet El Beat)" – 5:30
3. "Meet El Presidente" (7″ remix) – 3:38
4. "Vertigo (Do the Demolition)" – 4:43
- This 12″ is being labelled as "The Presidential Suite" on the cover.

=== 12″: Capitol / SPRO-79008 (Promo) United States ===
1. "Meet El Presidente (The Presidential Suite)" – 7:12
2. "Meet El Presidente (Meet El Beat)" – 5:30
3. "Meet El Presidente" (radio) – 3:38
4. "Skintrade" (Parisian mix) – 8:10
5. "Skintrade" (S.O.S. dub) – 7:16
- This 12″ is being labelled as "The Presidential Suite" on the cover.

=== CD: The Singles 1986–1995 box set ===
1. "Meet El Presidente" (7″ remix) – 3:38
2. "Vertigo (Do the Demolition)" – 4:43
3. "Meet El Presidente" – 7:12
4. "Meet El Presidente (Meet El Beat)" – 5:30

Note:

- The 7″ remix, 45 mix and "radio" are identical versions.
- "Meet El Presidente" and "Meet El Presidente (The Presidential Suite)" are the same version, also known as "The Presidential Suite mix" (EMI DDNX 331).

== Charts ==
Chart performance for "Meet El Presidente"
Chart (1987)	Peak position
Belgium (Ultratop 50 Flanders)	13
Europe (European Top 100 Singles)	27
Ireland (IRMA)	13
Italy (Musica e dischi)	10
Netherlands (Single Top 100)	31
Spain (AFYVE)	32
Spain Airplay (Top 40 Radio)	28
UK Singles (Official Charts)	24
US Billboard Hot 100	70
US Billboard Hot Dance Music/Maxi Singles Sales	40

== Personnel ==
Duran Duran

- Simon Le Bon – lead vocals
- John Taylor – bass guitar
- Nick Rhodes – keyboards

Additional musicians

- Steve Ferrone – drums
- Nile Rodgers – guitar
- The Borneo Horns – horns
- Curtis King – background vocals
- Brenda White-King – background vocals
- Tessa Niles – background vocals
- Cindy Mizelle – background vocals

Technical

- Nile Rodgers – producer
- Duran Duran – producer
- Daniel Abraham – remixer, engineer and mixer
- Larry Levan – remixer, "Skin Trade"
- Mark S. Berry – remixer, "Meet El Presidente"
