= David H. Long =

American and British businessman (born 1961)

- Born: 1961 (age 64–65); Liverpool
- Occupations: Former Chairman and Chief Executive Officer of Liberty Mutual Insurance Group (retired)
- Years active: 1985–present

David H. Long (born 1961 in Liverpool) is an American and British businessman who was the CEO and chairman of Liberty Mutual Insurance Group until his retirement at the end of 2022. In September 2014 the Obama administration announced its intention to appoint Long to be a member of the Advisory Committee for Trade Policy and Negotiations.

== Early life and education ==
Long received his BA in mathematics from Hartwick College in 1983. He received a master's degree in 1989 in finance from Boston College. In 1985 Long was hired by Liberty Mutual Insurance Group as a financial analyst in National Accounts.

== Career ==
Long started with Liberty Mutual in 1985 and has held positions in areas of underwriting and financial, mergers and acquisitions, international operations, and commercial markets during the thirty-three years he has been with the company. Among his titles are president, executive vice presidents, of Commercial Markets; and chief operating officer in National Markets. He is also a founding member of Liberty Mutual Agency Corporation. He was an active participant in the company's acquisition of Golden Eagle, Peerless Insurance, Summit, Colorado Casualty and Indiana Insurance. He retired at the end of 2022. In January 2023, Timothy M. Sweeney took over as President & CEO. In April 2025, Long resigned as chairman and Director.

== Compensation ==
In March 2014 it was made public that Long earned 24 percent more in 2013 than what he earned in 2012. His salary in 2013 was $6.63 million, and did not include an additional $4.67 million in incentives.

In 2017, Long earned a reported $19.7 million even though Liberty Mutual's profits were lower.

=== Office renovation ===
In 2012, Long famously spent $4.5 million to renovate his 1,335-square-foot office at the Liberty Mutual headquarters in Boston, Massachusetts.

== Personal life ==
Long is married to Stephanie Isgur Long, a fellow Hartwick graduate.

Long owns a $2.3 million 5,700-square-foot home on the island of Nantucket. In 2018, he hired a lawyer from Mintz, Levin, Cohn, Ferris, Glovsky, and Popeo to lobby state environmental officials to block the building of a dormitory for seasonal employees of the Miacomet Golf Course.

Long has focused on charitable initiatives geared toward individuals on the autism spectrum. His wife is the president of The Common Room, a social club for young adults with ASD. He also founded a pasta company that employs individuals with ASD.
