= Notorious (Duran Duran song) =

Single by Duran Duran

from the album Notorious
- B-side: "Winter Marches On"
- Released: 15 October 1986
- Recorded: June–September 1986
- Studio: Abbey Road (London)
- Genre: Funk rock; dance-rock
- Length: 4:19 (album version); 4:03 (7-inch version)
- Label: EMI; Capitol
- Songwriters: John Taylor; Nick Rhodes; Simon Le Bon
- Producers: Nile Rodgers; Duran Duran

Duran Duran singles chronology
"A View to a Kill" (1985)	"Notorious" (1986)	"Skin Trade" (1987)

Music video
- "Notorious" on YouTube

Alternative cover
- The Latin Rascals official remix cover

"Notorious" is a song by the English pop rock band Duran Duran, released on 15 October 1986 as the first single from their fourth studio album of the same name (1986). It showcased a new direction for Duran Duran with a funk rock sound.

It was the first single released by Duran Duran as a trio as Roger Taylor and Andy Taylor had both left the band by the time it was released. "Notorious" was a commercial success worldwide, reaching number seven on the UK Singles Chart, number two on the US Billboard Hot 100, and number one in Greece and Italy.

== Background ==
"Notorious" marked the debut of the new three-piece trio of Duran Duran, as drummer Roger Taylor and guitarist Andy Taylor had left the band by the time the single was released. The band had enlisted the help of Nile Rodgers of Chic fame to help produce the album. The single showcased a new sound for Duran Duran reaching for light funk, heavy on bass and brass sections.

Rodgers played guitar on the song, in addition to drummer Steve Ferrone and the Borneo Horns. In a 2011 interview, lead singer Simon Le Bon said of the song's distinctive riff, "I remember him playing some notes up the neck of his guitar and it was a riff. That was the first time that any of us had ever heard it. We just said, 'Man, we've got to have that.'" The abrupt nature of Andy Taylor's departure was reflected in the song; according to Le Bon, the lyric "Who really gives a damn for a flaky bandit" was a diss at the guitarist.

== Critical reception ==
In a contemporary review, Billboard praised the song's production calling it "Anglo-funk, sharp, tidy, made for dancing."

Donald A. Guarisco of AllMusic said, "The lyrics are as wordplay-driven as most Duran Duran hits usually were but show hints of a defensive posture towards gossip-mongers and the group's nay-saying critics via lines like "Fools run rings to break up something they'll never destroy" and "Spare your seedy judgments/Who says they're part of our lives?" Overall, these lyrics create an urban feel that bleeds over to the music, which intercuts staccato verses with a bright, soulfully up-tempo feel with a chorus that suffuses its singalong hooks with a jazzy sense of swing."

== Release ==
"Notorious" was released as a single by Capitol Records in the United States on 15 October 1986, and by EMI Records in the United Kingdom on 20 October.

"Notorious" was a massive commercial success internationally. It debuted at number 14 and peaked the following week at number 7 in the UK Singles Chart, and also performed very well in the US, reaching number 2 on the Billboard Hot 100. The song was also a success in other countries reaching the top 10 in Sweden, Norway, Spain, Switzerland, Belgium, New Zealand, the Netherlands and did even better particularly in Italy, where it went to number 1 for 4 consecutive weeks, becoming one of the best-selling singles of 1986 in the country.

== Music video ==
The music video for "Notorious" was shot at a warehouse in Manhattan by directors Peter Kagan and Paula Greif and was released on October 23, 1986, weeks before the album which saw heavy rotation on MTV. The video was shot in black and white Super-8 with a hand-held camera, with quick cuts and changes of zoom and focus featuring the three-piece band and Nile Rodgers performing the song on a sound stage, with scantily clad dancers in the background choreographed by Paula Abdul.

The video bore an uncanny resemblance to the videos the duo had filmed for Steve Winwood's "Higher Love" and Scritti Politti's "Perfect Way". The young model Christy Turlington appeared in outdoor scenes with the band, with a still photo from this location being used as the cover for the Notorious album.

== B-side and official remixes ==
For the first time, the B-side to the 7″ single was not an original recording; "Winter Marches On" was an unaltered version of the Notorious album track. Before this, Duran Duran had always provided either completely original songs or previously unheard remixes on the B-side.

As a first for the band, "Notorious" was released as two separate 12″ singles. The first had a Nile Rodgers-produced extended mix while the second featured a remix by the Latin Rascals.

There are 3 official mixes of "Notorious":

- "Notorious" (45 mix) – 4:04 (album version, with a slightly edited middle 8 and outro)
- "Notorious" (extended mix) – 5:14 (album version, with a one-minute dub intro added on)
- "Notorious" (The Latin Rascals mix) – 6:23 (basically the album version, with a 1:10 dub intro and two brief remixed interludes spliced in)

"Notorious" appears in various Duran Duran megamixes, most notably "Notoriousaurus Rex (Master Mix)", "Burning the Ground" and its B-side, "Decadance".

== Formats and track listings ==
=== 7″: EMI / DDN 45 United Kingdom ===
1. "Notorious" (45 mix) – 3:58
2. "Winter Marches On" – 3:25
- The "45 mix" is essentially the album version, with a slightly edited middle 8 section and outro.

=== 12″: EMI / 12 DDN 45 United Kingdom ===
1. "Notorious" (extended mix) – 5:14
2. "Notorious" (45 mix) – 3:58
3. "Winter Marches On" – 3:25
- Also released on MC in New Zealand (EMI / TC-GOOD 149).

=== 12″: EMI / 12 DDNX 45 United Kingdom ===
1. "Notorious" (The Latin Rascals mix) – 6:23
2. "Notorious" (45 mix) – 3:58
3. "Winter Marches On" – 3:25
- Also released on MC (TC DDNX 45).

=== 7″: Capitol / B-5648 United States ===
1. "Notorious" (45 mix) – 3:58
2. "Winter Marches On" – 3:25

=== 12″: Capitol / V-15264 United States ===
1. "Notorious" (extended mix) – 5:14
2. "Notorious" (45 mix) – 3:58
3. "Winter Marches On" – 3:25

=== 12″: Capitol / V-15266 United States ===
1. "Notorious" (The Latin Rascals mix) – 6:23
2. "Notorious" (45 mix) – 3:58
3. "Winter Marches On" – 3:25

=== CD: The Singles 1986–1995 box set ===
1. "Notorious" (45 mix) – 3:58
2. "Winter Marches On" – 3:25
3. "Notorious" (extended mix) – 5:14
4. "Notorious" (The Latin Rascals mix) – 6:23

== Personnel ==
Duran Duran

- Simon Le Bon – vocals
- John Taylor – bass guitars, background vocals
- Nick Rhodes – keyboards

Additional musicians

- Steve Ferrone – drums
- Nile Rodgers – guitars
- The Borneo Horns – horns
- Curtis King – background vocals
- Brenda White-King – background vocals
- Tessa Niles – background vocals
- Cindy Mizelle – background vocals

Technical

- Nile Rodgers – producer
- Duran Duran – producer
- Daniel Abraham – engineer and mixer
- The Latin Rascals – remixers

== Charts ==
=== Weekly charts ===
Weekly chart performance for "Notorious"
Chart (1986–1987)	Peak position
Australia (Kent Music Report)	17
Austria (Ö3 Austria Top 40)	14
Belgium (Ultratop 50 Flanders)	6
Denmark (IFPI)	2
Europe (European Hot 100 Singles)	4
Finland (Suomen virallinen lista)	3
France (SNEP)	37
Greece (IFPI)	1
Ireland (IRMA)	5
Israel (Israeli Singles Chart)	1
Italy (Musica e dischi)	1
Netherlands (Dutch Top 40)	6
Netherlands (Single Top 100)	6
New Zealand (Recorded Music NZ)	6
Norway (VG-lista)	4
Spain (AFYVE)	9
Spain Airplay (Top 40 Radio)	1
Sweden (Sverigetopplistan)	2
Switzerland (Schweizer Hitparade)	4
UK Singles (Official Charts)	7
US Billboard Hot 100	2
US Dance/Disco Club Play (Billboard) Remix version	26
West Germany (GfK)	12

=== Year-end charts ===
Year-end chart performance for Notorious
Chart (1987)	Position
Belgium (Ultratop)	71
Israel (Israeli Singles Chart)	34
Netherlands (Dutch Top 40)	77
Netherlands (Single Top 100)	69

Chart (1987)	Position
US Billboard Hot 100	25

== Release history ==
Release dates and formats for "Notorious"
Region	Date	Format(s)	Label(s)	Ref.
United States	15 October 1986	—N/a	Capitol	
United Kingdom	20 October 1986	7-inch vinyl; 12-inch vinyl	EMI	

== In popular culture ==
- "Notorious" was sampled in the Notorious B.I.G.'s 1999 posthumous rap hit "Notorious B.I.G.". The song has since been used by mixed martial artist Conor McGregor as his walkout song.
- The song was also used in soundtrack for the 2001 film Donnie Darko.
