= UMPG Audio Branding =

American production music company

- Founded: 1980
- Founder: Jonathan Elias; Scott Elias
- Headquarters: Santa Monica, California; New York City, New York
- Owner: Independent (1980–2018); Universal Music Group (2018–present)

UMPG Audio Branding (formerly Elias Audio Branding and Elias Arts) is an American production music company founded in 1980 by brothers Jonathan Elias and Scott Elias.

The company specializes in audio branding, having developed some of the most recognizable jingles and sonic logos in advertising. Such audio includes the Liberty Mutual jingle, "We Are Farmers" for Farmers Insurance Group, the MTV Moon landing station identification, and the Yahoo! yodel. In 2011, the company expanded to create the Elias Music Library under Jim Long.

In 2018, Elias Arts was acquired by Universal Production Music and later renamed to UMPG Audio Branding.
