= Jonathan Elias =

American film composer

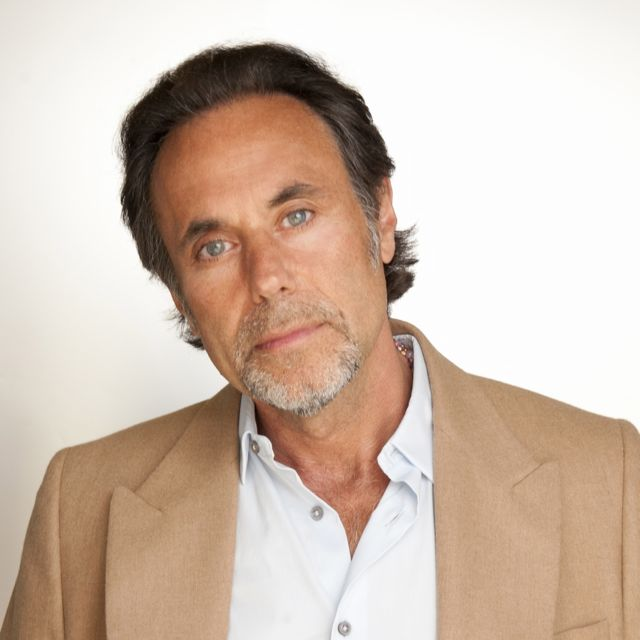
- Elias in 2011
- Born: 1956 (age 69–70); New York City, U.S.
- Occupations: Composer; record producer
- Years active: 1976–present
- Spouse(s): Patty Kelly (model, married/divorced)
- Children: 2
- Website: eliasarts.com

Jonathan Elias (born 1956) is an American composer best known for his film soundtracks.

== Background ==
Elias was born in New York City in 1956. He is of Jewish-Hungarian background. Elias started playing piano at the age of six, and was composing his own music by twelve, inspired in part by Broadway musicals. He liked rock music, but also admired Béla Bartók, Igor Stravinsky, and Sergei Rachmaninoff.

He attended the Eastman School of Music with aspirations of becoming a classical composer and conductor, and then Bennington College in Vermont in 1976. While still in school, he cut his teeth doing the music for movie trailers, most notably Alien, and later scored the trailers for Blade Runner, Gandhi, and Back to the Future. Elias went on to work on numerous movie soundtracks, starting with Children of the Corn and including Tuff Turf, Parents, Chaplin, and more.

== 1980s ==
He and his brother, Scott Elias, founded the music and advertising firm Elias Music in 1981.

He met John Barry (of James Bond soundtrack fame) in the early 1980s, and began working with him on several movie soundtracks, including Jagged Edge and A View to a Kill. It was during the A View to a Kill sessions in 1985 that Elias met and became friends with the members of pop group Duran Duran (they performed the title song for the movie).

While working on the soundtrack to the film 9½ Weeks the year after that, Elias co-wrote the single "I Do What I Do" with Duran Duran's bassist John Taylor, who performed the vocals — his first solo venture. The song went to #42 on the UK Singles Chart, and to #23 on the Billboard Hot 100 in the US. Elias and Taylor also co-wrote and co-produced the melancholy piano instrumental "Jazz", released on the b-side of the single. Elias and Taylor went on to co-write an album's worth of additional unreleased material together that year, which would eventually be collected on Taylor's 1999 album Résumé.

Elias produced an album for Grace Jones and co-produced (with Daniel Abraham) Duran Duran's 1988 album Big Thing. He also returned to play Moog synthesizer on Duran Duran's 1995 album Thank You.

In 1989, Elias recruited the entire Duran Duran lineup for his first solo album, called Requiem for the Americas. The most recognizable of Duran Duran's contributions to the album was vocalist Simon Le Bon's solo track "Follow In My Footsteps", which also featured The Bangles vocalist Susanna Hoffs on backup vocals. John Taylor played bass on "The Chant Movement", with other Duran members adding their instrumental touches on various tracks. Other vocalists on the album included Grace Jones, Toni Childs, Michael Bolton, Patti Scialfa, and Jon Anderson.

== 1990s—2000s ==
Elias then worked with the band Yes on their 1991 album Union. Many band members were not speaking to each other, and the disjointed working atmosphere and the involvement of outside musicians (which allowed the piece to be finished at all) led to an uneven album which was generally unpopular with critics and fans. Elias was often blamed for the album's failure.

In 1992, Elias moved to California, and shifted his focus from movies and rock music to advertising. His firm Elias Arts has won an Emmy Award for the "Move" theme for Nike Inc., and has garnered dozens of Clio Awards and other advertising trophies for work for top-line corporations such as Ford, GM, Nissan, Audi, Infiniti, Mercedes, AT&T, NASDAQ, IBM, Apple, Sony, Levi's, and Adidas.

In 1992–1993, he composed the fanfare for the 1993 Columbia Pictures logo debuting with the 1993 film Last Action Hero, and is still used till this day.

Elias released another solo project, The Prayer Cycle, in 1999. This is a nine-part contemporary choral symphony in twelve languages (including Hebrew, Latin, Swahili and Urdu). Vocalists on this album include Alanis Morissette, Linda Ronstadt, James Taylor, Ofra Haza, Nusrat Fateh Ali Khan, Salif Keita, and Yungchen Lhamo of Tibet.

In 2004, he released American River, a work combining piano and string quartet compositions with spoken word performances by Emmylou Harris, Kris Kristofferson, Marty Stuart, Rosanne Cash and Johnny Cash (in one of his last recorded works). American River was nominated for a Grammy Award for Best New Age Album in that year.

He also collaborated with Robert Downey, Jr. on his 2004 solo album The Futurist and on the soundtrack for Downey's film The Singing Detective. As of 2008, his most recent movie work has been on A Guide to Recognizing Your Saints (2006) and Pathfinder (2007), with the help of co-composers Jimmy Haun, David Wittman, Nathaniel Morgan and Tim Davies.

His most recent album is Prayer Cycle 2: Path to Zero, released in 2011. Guest vocalists this time include Sting, Salif Keita, Rahat Nusrat Fateh Ali Khan, Jonathan Davis of Korn, Jon Anderson, Trudie Styler, Angelique Kidjo, Richard Bona, Yungchen Lhamo, Dadawa, Robert Downey, Jr., Sinéad O'Connor, Serj Tankian, Alex Ebert and, via an archival recording, Jim Morrison.

== Personal life ==
Elias married Patty Kelly, a model from Deer Park, Long Island who was working in London at age 20 when she became the lead in the iconic MTV music video "Addicted to Love" by Robert Palmer. The couple had two children, Lilli and Jack Elias (born in ~1996 and ~2001 respectively) and later divorced. In a 2013 interview, Patty explained that the two were not aware of their MTV connection, with him having done the signature guitar riff for the channel idents and her performing in this music video, until "maybe on our second or third date".

== Discography ==
=== Solo albums ===
- Requiem for the Americas: Songs from the Lost World (1990)
- The Prayer Cycle (March 23, 1999 Sony Classical)
- American River (August 24, 2004 Decca Records)
- Prayer Cycle 2: Path to Zero (2011, Across the Universe Records)

=== As record producer (selected discography) ===
- Big Thing (1988), Duran Duran
- Gutterboy (1990), Gutterboy
- Bulletproof Heart (1989), Grace Jones
- Union (1991), Yes
- The Futurist (2004), Robert Downey, Jr.

=== Film and television scores ===
- Children of the Corn (1984)
- Almost You (1984)
- Tuff Turf (1985)
- Jagged Edge (1985), synth programming only
- Vamp (1986)
- 9½ Weeks (1986), title song only
- Two Moon Junction (1988)
- Shakedown (1988)
- Parents (1989)
- Far From Home (1989)
- Rude Awakening (1989)
- Forced March (1989)
- Chaplin (1992), title song only
- The Heart of Justice (1992)
- Morning Glory (1993)
- Leprechaun 2 (1994)
- Jailbait (1994)
- Recon (1996)
- The Century: America's Time (1999) (mini) TV mini-series
- The Invisible Man (2000) TV series
- A Guide to Recognizing Your Saints (2006)
- Second Generation (2006) TV advertisement
- Pathfinder (2007)
- Fighting (2009)
- Children of the Corn (2009) TV movie
