= Duran Duran discography =

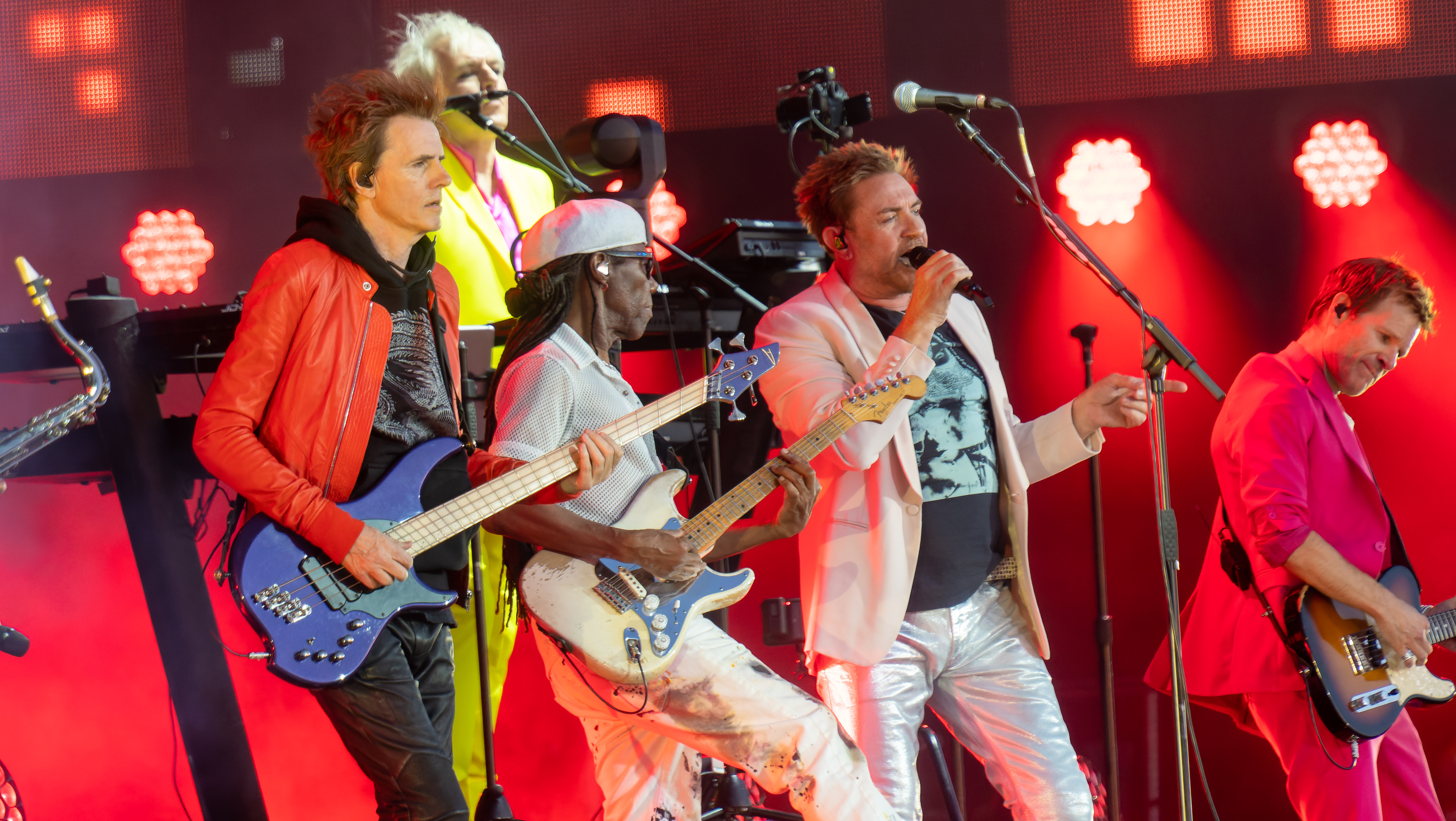
- Duran Duran with Nile Rodgers performing in 2022
- Studio albums: 16
- Extended plays: 7
- Live albums: 4
- Compilation albums: 4
- Singles: 50
- Video albums: 14

English new wave band Duran Duran have released 16 studio albums, four live albums, four compilation albums, two remix albums, two box sets, seven extended plays, 50 singles and 14 video albums. Duran Duran have sold over 100 million records. The band have achieved UK top-five albums in five consecutive decades (1980s to 2020s), and US top-10 albums in three decades (1980s, 1990s and 2010s).

== Albums ==
=== Studio albums ===
List of studio albums, with selected details, chart positions, and certifications
Title	Details	Peak chart positions										Certifications
Title	Details	UK	AUS	CAN	FIN	GER	ITA	NLD	NZ	SWE	US	Certifications
Duran Duran	Released: 15 June 1981; Label: EMI	3	9	27	—	—	—	—	2	3	10	BPI: Platinum; ARIA: Platinum; MC: 2× Platinum; RIAA: Platinum; RMNZ: 2× Platinum
Rio	Released: 10 May 1982; Label: EMI	2	1	1	3	—	—	40	2	9	6	BPI: Platinum; ARIA: Platinum; IFPI FIN: Gold; MC: 2× Platinum; RIAA: 2× Platinum; RMNZ: Platinum
Seven and the Ragged Tiger	Released: 21 November 1983; Label: EMI	1	2	7	3	17	12	1	1	19	8	BPI: Platinum; IFPI FIN: Gold; MC: 3× Platinum; RIAA: 2× Platinum; RMNZ: Platinum
Notorious	Released: 24 November 1986; Label: EMI	16	30	19	19	22	2	11	15	8	12	BPI: Gold; MC: Platinum; RIAA: Platinum
Big Thing	Released: 18 October 1988; Label: EMI	15	46	29	—	31	5	77	34	27	24	BPI: Silver; RIAA: Gold
Liberty	Released: 20 August 1990; Label: Parlophone	8	86	—	—	—	6	37	—	—	46	BPI: Silver
Duran Duran (The Wedding Album)	Released: 15 February 1993; Label: Parlophone	4	20	8	18	22	6	23	32	21	7	BPI: Gold; RIAA: Platinum
Thank You	Released: 27 March 1995; Label: Parlophone	12	63	15	—	50	14	34	—	—	19	MC: Gold; RIAA: Gold
Medazzaland	Released: 14 October 1997; Label: Capitol	—	—	66	—	67	—	—	—	—	58	
Pop Trash	Released: 19 June 2000; Label: Hollywood	53	—	—	—	80	39	—	—	—	135	
Astronaut	Released: 11 October 2004; Label: Epic	3	22	9	—	23	2	17	29	41	17	BPI: Gold
Red Carpet Massacre	Released: 13 November 2007; Label: Epic	44	69	—	—	85	10	73	—	—	36	
All You Need Is Now	Released: 21 March 2011; Label: Tapemodern	11	79	52	—	39	10	23	—	—	29	
Paper Gods	Released: 11 September 2015; Label: Warner Bros.	5	19	7	28	24	2	4	24	—	10	
Future Past	Released: 22 October 2021; Label: BMG	3	16	53	21	8	10	9	35	—	28	
Danse Macabre	Released: 27 October 2023; Label: BMG	4	—	—	34	14	9	31	—	—	57	
"—" denotes items that did not chart or were not released in that territory.

=== Live albums ===
List of live albums, with selected details, chart positions, and certifications
Title	Details	Peak chart positions										Certifications
Title	Details	UK	AUS	CAN	FIN	GER	ITA	NLD	NZ	SWE	US	Certifications
Arena	Released: 12 November 1984; Label: Parlophone	6	8	10	8	1	1	5	3	16	4	BPI: Platinum; BVMI: Gold; MC: 2× Platinum; RIAA: 2× Platinum; RMNZ: Platinum
Live from London	Released: 25 October 2005; Label: Epic	—	—	—	—	—	—	—	—	—	—	
Live at Hammersmith '82!	Released: 21 September 2009; Label: EMI	—	—	—	—	—	—	—	—	—	—	
A Diamond in the Mind: Live 2011	Released: 10 July 2012; Label: Eagle	—	—	—	—	59	40	—	—	—	—	
Budokan	Released: 2018; Label: Warner Bros.; Limited Record Store Day release, 3000 copies	—	—	—	—	—	—	—	—	—	—	
"—" denotes items that did not chart or were not released in that territory.

=== Compilation albums ===
List of compilation albums, with selected details, chart positions and certifications
Title	Details	Peak chart positions										Certifications
Title	Details	UK	AUS	CAN	FIN	GER	ITA	NLD	NZ	SWE	US	Certifications
Decade	Released: 13 November 1989; Label: EMI	5	89	81	—	—	22	84	—	—	67	BPI: Platinum; RIAA: Platinum
Greatest	Released: 9 November 1998; Label: EMI	4	82	74	13	51	22	24	12	38	170	BPI: 3× Platinum; ARIA: Gold; MC: Gold; RIAA: Platinum; RMNZ: Platinum
The Essential Collection	Released: 20 March 2000; Label: EMI	—	—	—	—	—	—	—	—	—	—	
The Biggest and the Best	Released: 10 September 2012; Label: Music Club Deluxe	—	—	—	—	—	—	—	—	—	—	
"—" denotes items that did not chart or were not released in that territory.

=== Remix albums ===
List of remix albums, with selected details and chart positions
Title	Details	Peak chart positions
Title	Details	UK
Night Versions	Released: 31 March 1998; Label: EMI	—
Strange Behaviour	Released: 23 March 1999; Label: EMI	70
Free to Love: Hot Star Remixes	Released: 26 June 2026; Label: Tape Modern	
"—" denotes items that did not chart or were not released in that territory.

=== Box sets ===
List of box sets, with selected details, chart positions and certifications
Title	Details	Peak chart positions	Certifications
Title	Details	ITA	Certifications
Singles Box Set 1981–1985	Released: 12 May 2003; Label: EMI	42	BPI: Gold
The Singles 1986–1995	Released: 13 September 2004; Label: EMI	19	

== Extended plays ==
List of extended plays, with selected details and chart positions
Title	Details	Peak chart positions		
Title	Details	AUS	ITA	US
Nite Romantics	Released: 1 September 1981 (Japan); Label: EMI	—	—	—
Night Versions	Released: April 1982 (Australia); Label: EMI	19	—	—
Carnival	Released: September 1982 (US/Japan); Label: EMI	—	—	98
Tiger Tiger	Released: 5 June 1984 (Japan); Label: EMI	—	—	—
Mixing	Released: 1985 (Italy); Label: Parlophone	—	3	—
Strange Behaviour	Released: 21 March 1987 (Japan/Italy); Label: EMI	—	—	—
From Mediterranea with Love	Released: 23 December 2010; Label: Tapemodern	—	—	—
"—" denotes items that did not chart or were not released in that territory.

== Singles ==
=== 1980s ===
List of singles released from 1981 to 1989, with selected chart positions and certifications
Title	Year	Peak chart positions										Certifications	Album
Title	Year	UK	AUS	BEL (FL)	CAN	FIN	GER	ITA	NLD	NZ	US	Certifications	Album
"Planet Earth"	1981	12	8	—	—	—	—	—	—	—	—		Duran Duran
"Careless Memories"	1981	37	60	—	—	—	—	—	—	—	—		Duran Duran
"Girls on Film"	1981	5	11	30	—	—	—	—	—	4	—	RMNZ: Gold; BPI: Gold	Duran Duran
"My Own Way"	1981	14	10	—	—	14	—	—	—	12	—		Non-album single
"Hungry Like the Wolf"	1982	5	5	—	1	4	—	—	50	4	3	BPI: Platinum; MC: Gold; RIAA: Gold	Rio
"Save a Prayer"	1982	2	56	40	—	—	—	—	—	35	—	BPI: Gold	Rio
"Rio"	1982	9	60	—	3	14	—	—	—	36	14	BPI: Gold	Rio
"Is There Something I Should Know?"	1983	1	4	16	3	2	28	20	24	5	4	BPI: Gold	Duran Duran (1983 US edition)
"Union of the Snake"	1983	3	4	19	2	1	37	16	17	3	3	BPI: Silver; MC: Gold	Seven and the Ragged Tiger
"New Moon on Monday"	1984	9	48	—	14	6	—	—	28	32	10		Seven and the Ragged Tiger
"The Reflex"	1984	1	4	1	3	3	8	6	1	6	1	NVPI: Gold; BPI: Gold; MC: Platinum; RIAA: Gold	Seven and the Ragged Tiger
"The Wild Boys"	1984	2	3	2	2	4	1	3	3	5	2	BPI: Silver; BVMI: Gold; MC: Gold; RIAA: Gold	Arena
"Save a Prayer" (US single version)	1985	—	—	19	17	—	27	—	17	—	16		Rio
"A View to a Kill"	1985	2	6	2	1	6	9	1	3	13	1	BPI: Silver; MC: Gold	A View to a Kill (soundtrack)
"Notorious"	1986	7	17	6	10	4	12	1	6	6	2		Notorious
"Skin Trade"	1987	22	—	9	69	—	35	8	11	36	39		Notorious
"Meet El Presidente"	1987	24	—	13	—	—	54	10	31	—	70		Notorious
"I Don't Want Your Love"	1988	14	23	15	6	15	31	1	11	12	4		Big Thing
"All She Wants Is"	1988	9	74	—	42	17	28	2	44	47	22		Big Thing
"Do You Believe in Shame?"	1989	30	—	—	88	22	—	14	41	—	72		Big Thing
"Burning the Ground"	1989	31	145	—	—	—	—	7	75	—	—		Decade
"—" denotes items that did not chart or were not released in that territory.

=== 1990s ===
List of singles released from 1990 to 1997, with selected chart positions and certifications
Title	Year	Peak chart positions										Certifications	Album
Title	Year	UK	AUS	BEL (FL)	CAN	FIN	GER	ITA	NLD	NZ	US	Certifications	Album
"Violence of Summer (Love's Taking Over)"	1990	20	59	43	82	15	69	3	43	—	64		Liberty
"Serious"	1990	48	152	—	—	—	69	1	—	—	—		Liberty
"Ordinary World"	1993	6	18	20	1	18	16	1	16	3	3	BPI: Platinum; RIAA: Gold	Duran Duran (The Wedding Album)
"Come Undone"	1993	13	19	42	2	—	42	8	—	16	6	BPI: Silver; RMNZ: Gold	Duran Duran (The Wedding Album)
"Too Much Information"	1993	35	93	—	26	—	—	—	—	48	45		Duran Duran (The Wedding Album)
"Perfect Day"	1995	28	—	—	—	—	—	—	—	—	—		Thank You
"White Lines (Don't Do It)"	1995	17	20	—	28	—	—	22	—	31	—		Thank You
"Lay Lady Lay"	1995	—	—	—	—	—	—	18	—	—	—		Thank You
"Out of My Mind"	1997	21	91	—	55	—	—	5	—	—	—		Medazzaland
"Electric Barbarella"	1997	23	—	—	19	—	—	—	—	—	52		Medazzaland
"—" denotes items that did not chart or were not released in that territory.

=== 2000s–present ===
List of singles released from 2000 to the present, with selected chart positions
Title	Year	Peak chart positions										Album
Title	Year	UK	AUS	BEL (FL)	GER	ITA	NLD	NZ	SCO	SWI	US	Album
"Someone Else Not Me"	2000	53	—	—	—	26	—	—	63	—	—	Pop Trash
"(Reach Up for The) Sunrise"	2004	5	22	42	39	2	25	37	7	61	89	Astronaut
"What Happens Tomorrow"	2005	11	—	58	80	2	—	—	15	—	—	Astronaut
"Nice"	2005	—	—	—	—	—	—	—	—	—	—	Astronaut
"Falling Down"	2007	52	—	—	79	2	—	—	21	60	—	Red Carpet Massacre
"All You Need Is Now"	2010	—	—	—	—	56	—	—	—	—	—	All You Need Is Now
"Girl Panic!"	2011	—	—	—	—	—	—	—	—	—	—	All You Need Is Now
"Leave a Light On"	2011	—	—	—	—	—	—	—	—	—	—	All You Need Is Now
"Pressure Off"	2015	—	—	138	—	59	—	—	—	—	—	Paper Gods
"Five Years"	2021	— (Note: "Five Years" did not enter the UK Singles Chart, but peaked at number 60 on the UK Singles Downloads Chart.)	—	—	—	—	—	—	—	—	—	non-album track
"Invisible"	2021	— (Note: "Invisible" did not enter the UK Singles Chart, but peaked at number 44 on the UK Singles Downloads Chart.)	—	146	—	—	—	—	—	—	—	Future Past
"More Joy!" (featuring Chai)	2021	—	—	—	—	—	—	—	—	—	—	Future Past
"Anniversary"	2021	— (Note: "Anniversary" did not enter the UK Singles Chart, but peaked at number 56 on the UK Singles Downloads Chart.)	—	—	—	—	—	—	—	—	—	Future Past
"Tonight United"	2021	—	—	—	—	—	—	—	—	—	—	Future Past
"Give It All Up" (featuring Tove Lo)	2021	— (Note: "Give It All Up" did not enter the UK Singles Chart, but peaked at number 99 on the UK Singles Downloads Chart.)	—	—	—	—	—	—	—	—	—	Future Past
"Danse Macabre"	2023	— (Note: "Danse Macabre" did not enter the UK Singles Chart, but peaked at number 45 on the UK Singles Downloads Chart.)	—	—	—	—	—	—	—	—	—	Danse Macabre
"Black Moonlight"	2023	— (Note: "Black Moonlight" did not enter the UK Singles Chart, but peaked at number 28 on the UK Singles Downloads Chart.)	—	—	—	—	—	—	—	—	—	Danse Macabre
"Psycho Killer" (featuring Victoria De Angelis)	2023	—	—	—	—	—	—	—	—	—	—	Danse Macabre
"New Moon (Dark Phase)"	2024	— (Note: "New Moon (Dark Phase)" did not enter the UK Singles Chart, but peaked at number 66 on the UK Singles Downloads Chart.)	—	—	—	—	—	—	—	—	—	Danse Macabre
"Evil Woman"	2024	— (Note: "Evil Woman" did not enter the UK Singles Chart, but peaked at number 78 on the UK Singles Downloads Chart.)	—	—	—	—	—	—	—	—	—	Danse Macabre
"Shadows on Your Side"	2025	—	—	—	—	—	—	—	—	—	—	non-album tracks
"Free to Love" (with Nile Rodgers)	2026	—	—	—	—	—	—	—	—	—	—	non-album tracks
"—" denotes items that did not chart or were not released in that territory.

== Guest appearances ==
List of guest appearances
Year	Title	Album
1995	"Thank You"	Encomium: A Tribute to Led Zeppelin
2007	"Instant Karma!"	Instant Karma: The Amnesty International Campaign to Save Darfur
2010	"Boys Keep Swinging"	We Were So Turned On: A Tribute to David Bowie

== Videography ==
=== Video albums ===
List of video albums
Year	Title	Additional notes
1983	Duran Duran	Video compilation
1984	Duran Duran Video 45	Video EP featuring "Girls on Film" and "Hungry Like the Wolf"
1984	Dancing on the Valentine	Video compilation
1984	As the Lights Go Down	Slightly different version of Arena film. Initially only shown on Cinemax and MTV, released to the consumer market first with the 2010 reissue of Seven and the Ragged Tiger.
1984	Sing Blue Silver	Documentary; released on DVD in 2004
1985	Arena (An Absurd Notion)	Concert film; released on DVD in 2004
1985	The Making of Arena	Documentary; released on DVD in 2004
1987	Three to Get Ready	Black-and-white documentary * Short version – 29 minutes * Long version ("Collector's Edition") – 75 minutes
1988	Working for the Skin Trade	Concert film
1988	6ix by 3hree	Video compilation
1989	Decade	Video compilation. 1995 UK version adds videos of "Violence of Summer", "Serious", "Ordinary World" and "Come Undone." Certified Gold in the United States in December 1990.
1994	Extraordinary World	Documentary and video compilation
1998	Greatest	Video compilation; reissued on DVD in 2003. Certified Platinum in the United States in January 2004.
2005	Live from London	Concert at Wembley Arena. Certified Gold in the United States in March 2006.
2008	Classic Albums: Rio	2008 documentary on the making of Rio.
2009	Live at Hammersmith '82!	1982 Rio Tour concert at London's Hammersmith Odeon. Released as a CD/DVD package, the DVD also includes bonus tracks including the promo video of "My Own Way" which had never been released on DVD.
2012	A Diamond in the Mind: Live 2011	2011 All You Need Is Now Tour concert at Manchester's MEN Arena. Includes bonus features of two additional songs as well as a behind the scenes documentary including interviews with band members.

=== Music videos ===
- "Planet Earth" (1981)
- "Careless Memories" (1981)
- "Girls on Film" (1981)
- "My Own Way" (1981)
- "Friends of Mine" (1981)
- "Hungry Like the Wolf" (1982)
- "Save a Prayer" (1982)
- "Lonely in Your Nightmare" (1982)
- "Rio" (1982)
- "Night Boat" (1982)
- "The Chauffeur" (1982)
- "Is There Something I Should Know?" (1983)
- "Union of the Snake" (1983)
- "New Moon on Monday" (1984)
- "The Reflex" (1984)
- "The Wild Boys" (1984)
- "Save a Prayer" (Live) (1985)
- "A View to a Kill" (1985)
- "Notorious" (1986)
- "Skin Trade" (1987)
- "Meet El Presidente" (1987)
- "I Don't Want Your Love" (1988)
- "All She Wants Is" (1988)
- "Do You Believe in Shame?" (1989)
- "Burning the Ground" (1989)
- "Violence of Summer (Love's Taking Over)" (1990)
- "Serious" (1990)
- "Ordinary World" (1993)
- "Come Undone" (1993)
- "Too Much Information" (1993)
- "Breath After Breath" (1993)
- "Femme Fatale" (1993)
- "Perfect Day" (1995)
- "White Lines (Don't Do It)" (1995)
- "Out of My Mind" (1997)
- "Electric Barbarella" (1997)
- "Someone Else Not Me" (2000)
- "(Reach Up for The) Sunrise" (2004)
- "What Happens Tomorrow" (2005)
- "Falling Down" (2007)
- "Make Me Smile (Come Up and See Me)" (2009)
- "All You Need Is Now" (2010)
- "Girl Panic!" (2011)
- "Hungry Like the Wolf" (Steve Aoki Remix; 2012)
- "Pressure Off" (2015)
- "Pressure Off" (360° lyric video; 2015)
- "Last Night in the City" (2016)
- "Face for Today (2017)
- "The Edge of America" (2018)
- "Five Years" (2021)
- "Invisible" (2021)
- "Anniversary" (2021)
- "More Joy!" (lyric video; 2021)
- "Ball and Chain" (lyric video; 2022)
- "Anniversary" (Duran Duran All-Toy Funko Pop line Version created by Los Angeles Fan/Director; 2022)
- "Danse Macabre" (2023)
- "Black Moonlight" (2023)
- "Evil Woman" (2024)

== Record label timeline ==
- 1980–1999: EMI/Capitol/Parlophone
- 1999–2001: Hollywood Records
- 2004–2009: Epic Records
- 2010–2012: Tapemodern/S-Curve Records
- 2015–2021: Warner Bros. Records
- 2021–present: BMG
