= Live from London (Duran Duran) =

Video by Duran Duran
- Released: 25 October 2005
- Recorded: April 2004
- Venue: Wembley Arena (London)
- Length: 122:38 (DVD)
- Label: Epic
- Director: Lawrence Jordan
- Producer: Daniel Catullo; Jack Gulick

Duran Duran chronology
Greatest (2003)	Live from London (2005)	Live at Hammersmith '82! (2009)

Live from London is a concert film by the English pop rock band Duran Duran. It was filmed during the course of the last two of five sold-out nights at Wembley Arena in April 2004, during the band's first global tour after the reunion of the band's original five members.

The concert features hits from their 25-year catalog, together with live versions of the singles from their 2004 studio album Astronaut. The band was joined on stage by saxophonist Andy Hamilton and backing vocalist Sarah Brown.

Live from London is sold as a single-DVD set and also as a deluxe DVD+CD box set, which features 20 songs on the DVD and 10 songs on the CD. Bonus features in the deluxe set include a tour documentary, multi-angled viewing options, photo gallery, interviews, and behind the scenes footage. It was certified gold by the RIAA on 9 March 2006.

The concert was directed by Lawrence Jordan for Coming Home Studios, and filmed using twenty-eight cameras. The DVD is presented in 16:9 widescreen format, and the audio options include SRS 5.1 Circle Surround Sound, and 5.1 DTS.

The package was Duran Duran's first DVD release since the 2003 music video compilation Greatest, and their first concert film since 1985's Arena.

== Track listing ==
1. "(Reach Up for The) Sunrise"
2. "Hungry Like the Wolf"
3. "Is There Something I Should Know?"
4. "Union of the Snake"
5. "Come Undone"
6. "A View to a Kill"
7. "What Happens Tomorrow"
8. "The Chauffeur"
9. "Planet Earth"
10. "I Don't Want Your Love"
11. "New Religion"
12. "Ordinary World"
13. "Night Boat"
14. "Save a Prayer"
15. "Notorious"
16. "The Reflex"
17. "Careless Memories"
18. "The Wild Boys"
19. "Girls on Film"
20. "Rio"

=== Bonus CD (deluxe edition) ===
1. "Show Intro"
2. "(Reach Up for The) Sunrise"
3. "Hungry Like the Wolf"
4. "Planet Earth"
5. "Ordinary World"
6. "Save a Prayer"
7. "Notorious"
8. "Careless Memories"
9. "The Wild Boys"
10. "Girls on Film"
11. "Rio"

== Personnel ==
Duran Duran

- Simon Le Bon – lead vocals
- Andy Taylor – guitar and backing vocals
- John Taylor – bass guitar and backing vocals
- Roger Taylor – drums
- Nick Rhodes – keyboards, synthesizers, sound effects and backing vocals

Additional musicians

- Sarah Brown – backing vocals
- Andy Hamilton - saxophone

== Charts ==
Chart (2005)	Peak position
Australian DVD chart (ARIA Charts)	20

== Certifications ==
Region	Certification	Certified units/sales
Australia (ARIA)	Gold	7,500^{^}
^{^} Shipments figures based on certification alone.
