= Greatest (Duran Duran album) =

1998 greatest hits album by Duran Duran

Greatest hits album by Duran Duran
- Released: 3 November 1998
- Recorded: 1980–1997
- Genres: New wave; synth-pop
- Length: 78:23
- Labels: EMI; Capitol
- Producer: Various

Duran Duran chronology
Night Versions: The Essential Duran Duran (1998)	Greatest (1998)	Strange Behaviour (1999)

Singles from Greatest
- 1. "Electric Barbarella" Released: 18 January 1999

Professional ratings
Review scores
Source	Rating
AllMusic	4.5/5 stars
The Encyclopedia of Popular Music	4/5 stars
Pitchfork	7.0/10
The Rolling Stone Album Guide	4/5 stars

Greatest is a greatest hits album by the English pop rock band Duran Duran, released in 1998.

== Background and release ==
Greatest is an update of the 1989 tenth anniversary compilation album, Decade. The new release includes songs from their eponymous debut album through 1997's Medazzaland (excluding 1995's Thank You). The album includes all 14 songs featured on Decade, plus "New Moon on Monday" and four singles from the '90s. However, several songs on the disc are presented in their edited forms in order to fit on a single CD. In addition, the disc uses an edit of "Rio" that was not actually used on any of the song's US single releases, and to this day, has not appeared on any release other than Greatest or The Essential Collection.

The album was released by EMI after parting ways with the band following the unsuccessful Medazzaland album release in 1997, marking the first of many releases designed to capitalise on the band's extensive EMI-controlled back catalogue. To coincide with the release of the Greatest album in the United Kingdom, the song "Electric Barbarella" was released as a single in that territory. This track was originally released as a single in North America in 1997 to promote the Medazzaland album (which was never released officially in Europe until 2022).

By 2008, the collection had sold 1.3 million copies in the United States, and was certified Platinum by the RIAA. Greatest was released on vinyl in 2025 for the first time (with a remastered CD edition as well); that release used the album version of Notorious instead of the 45 mix that was on the previous releases.

== Track listing ==
All tracks are written by Simon Le Bon, Nick Rhodes, Andy Taylor, John Taylor and Roger Taylor, except where noted.

No.	Title	Writer(s)	Original album	Length
1.	"Is There Something I Should Know?"		non-album single, 1983	4:10
2.	"The Reflex" (7" version)		Seven and the Ragged Tiger, 1983	4:24
3.	"A View to a Kill"	John Barry; Le Bon; Rhodes; A. Taylor; J. Taylor; R. Taylor	A View to a Kill soundtrack, 1985	3:34
4.	"Ordinary World" (single version)	Warren Cuccurullo; Le Bon; Rhodes; J. Taylor	Duran Duran (The Wedding Album), 1993	4:42
5.	"Save a Prayer" (US single version)		Rio, 1982	3:47
6.	"Rio" (US edit)		Rio	4:45
7.	"Hungry Like the Wolf" (single version)		Rio	3:25
8.	"Girls on Film"		Duran Duran, 1981	3:27
9.	"Planet Earth"		Duran Duran	3:57
10.	"Union of the Snake"		Seven and the Ragged Tiger	4:22
11.	"New Moon on Monday"		Seven and the Ragged Tiger	4:16
12.	"The Wild Boys"		Arena, 1984	4:17
13.	"Notorious" (45 mix)	Le Bon; Rhodes; J. Taylor	Notorious, 1986	4:00
14.	"I Don't Want Your Love" (Shep Pettibone 7" mix)	Le Bon; Rhodes; J. Taylor	Big Thing, 1988	3:48
15.	"All She Wants Is" (45 mix)	Le Bon; Rhodes; J. Taylor	Big Thing	4:26
16.	"Electric Barbarella" (edit)	Cuccurullo; Le Bon; Rhodes	Medazzaland, 1997	4:17
17.	"Serious" (edit)	Sterling Campbell; Cuccurullo; Le Bon; Rhodes; J. Taylor	Liberty, 1990	3:56
18.	"Skin Trade" (radio cut)	Le Bon; Rhodes; J. Taylor	Notorious	4:26
19.	"Come Undone" (edit)	Cuccurullo; Le Bon; Rhodes; J. Taylor	Duran Duran (The Wedding Album)	4:17
Total length:				78:23

2005 bonus DVD
No.	Title	Length
1.	"Planet Earth"
2.	"Girls on Film" (short censored version)
3.	"The Chauffeur"
4.	"Hungry Like the Wolf"
5.	"Save a Prayer"
6.	"Rio"
7.	"Is There Something I Should Know?"
8.	"Union of the Snake"
9.	"New Moon on Monday" (edit version 1)
10.	"The Reflex"
11.	"The Wild Boys" (7" final edit)
12.	"A View to a Kill"
13.	"Notorious"
14.	"Skin Trade"
15.	"I Don't Want Your Love"
16.	"All She Wants Is"
17.	"Serious"
18.	"Burning the Ground"
19.	"Ordinary World"
20.	"Come Undone" (censored version)

== Video album ==
Greatest
- DVD cover

Video by Duran Duran
- Released: 1999; November 2003 (DVD)
- Recorded: 1981–1998
- Genres: New wave; synth-pop
- Length: 101 minutes
- Label: EMI/Abbey Road Interactive
- Producer: Various

Duran Duran chronology
Extraordinary World (1995)	Greatest (1999)	Live from London (2005)

Greatest was followed in 1999 by the release of a videotape compilation of the band's groundbreaking music videos. The video album was certified platinum by the RIAA on 29 January 2004. In November 2003, the video album was released in DVD format, titled Duran Duran: Greatest – The DVD, with hidden extra materials, including alternative versions of some of the videos and interviews of the band; however, this version is much criticised for its extensive use of Easter egg features, which make it difficult to find and play some materials. In 2005, the disc was re-issued in a "Sight & Sound" package, containing both the CD and the DVD minus all of the latter's bonus material.

=== Track listing ===
VHS release
No.	Title	Length
1.	"Girls on Film" (uncensored)
2.	"The Chauffeur" (uncensored)
3.	"Hungry Like the Wolf"
4.	"Save a Prayer"
5.	"Rio"
6.	"Is There Something I Should Know?"
7.	"Union of the Snake"
8.	"The Wild Boys" (extended version)
9.	"A View to a Kill"
10.	"Notorious"
11.	"Skin Trade"
12.	"I Don't Want Your Love"
13.	"All She Wants Is"
14.	"Serious"
15.	"Burning the Ground"
16.	"Ordinary World"
17.	"Come Undone"
18.	"Electric Barbarella"
19.	"My Own Way"
20.	"The Wedding Album EPK"

DVD release
No.	Title	Length
1.	"Planet Earth"
2.	"Girls on Film" (long uncensored version)
3.	"The Chauffeur"
4.	"Hungry Like the Wolf"
5.	"Save a Prayer"
6.	"Rio"
7.	"Is There Something I Should Know?"
8.	"Union of the Snake"
9.	"New Moon on Monday"
10.	"The Reflex"
11.	"The Wild Boys" (7" edit version)
12.	"A View to a Kill"
13.	"Notorious"
14.	"Skin Trade"
15.	"I Don't Want Your Love"
16.	"All She Wants Is"
17.	"Serious"
18.	"Burning the Ground"
19.	"Ordinary World"
20.	"Come Undone" (uncensored version)
21.	"Electric Barbarella"

== Personnel ==
=== Duran Duran ===
- Simon Le Bon – lead vocals
- Nick Rhodes – keyboards
- John Taylor – bass (tracks 1–15, 17, 18)
- Andy Taylor – guitars (tracks 1–3, 5–12)
- Roger Taylor – drums (tracks 1–3, 5–12)
- Warren Cuccurullo – guitars (tracks 4, 13–19), bass (16)
- Sterling Campbell – drums (tracks 15, 17)

=== Production ===
- Nigel Reeve – mastering, co-ordination, compilation
- Terry Burch – mastering
- Malcolm Garrett – package design

== Charts ==
=== Weekly charts ===
1998 weekly chart performance for Greatest
Chart (1998)	Peak position
Belgian Albums (Ultratop Flanders)	19
Belgian Albums (Ultratop Wallonia)	35
Canada Top Albums/CDs (RPM)	74

1999 weekly chart performance for Greatest
Chart (1999)	Peak position
Austrian Albums (Ö3 Austria)	30
Danish Albums (Hitlisten)	9
Dutch Albums (Album Top 100)	24
Finnish Albums (Suomen virallinen lista)	13
Norwegian Albums (VG-lista)	13
US Billboard 200	170

2000 weekly chart performance for Greatest
Chart (2000)	Peak position
Swedish Albums (Sverigetopplistan)	38

2003 weekly chart performance for Greatest
Chart (2003)	Peak position
Australian Albums (ARIA)	82
New Zealand Albums (RMNZ)	12

2004 weekly chart performance for Greatest
Chart (2004)	Peak position
Scottish Albums (Official Charts)	7
UK Albums (Official Charts)	4

2005 weekly chart performance for Greatest
Chart (2005)	Peak position
Italian Albums (FIMI)	22

2025 weekly chart performance for Greatest
Chart (2025)	Peak position
Croatian International Albums (HDU)	3
German Albums (Offizielle Top 100)	51
Hungarian Albums (MAHASZ)	9
Swiss Albums (Schweizer Hitparade)	96

=== Year-end charts ===
1998 year-end chart performance for Greatest
Chart (1998)	Position
Belgian Albums (Ultratop Flanders)	83
UK Albums (OCC)	59

2004 year-end chart performance for Greatest
Chart (2004)	Position
UK Albums (OCC)	74

== Certifications ==
Certifications for Greatest
Region	Certification	Certified units/sales
Argentina (CAPIF)	Platinum	60,000^{^}
Australia (ARIA)	Gold	35,000^{^}
Belgium (BRMA)	2× Platinum	100,000^{*}
Canada (Music Canada)	Gold	50,000^{^}
Italy (FIMI) Sales + streams since 2009	Platinum	50,000^{‡}
Netherlands (NVPI)	Gold	50,000^{^}
New Zealand (RMNZ)	Platinum	15,000^{^}
United Kingdom (BPI)	3× Platinum	900,000^{*}
United States (RIAA)	Platinum	1,000,000^{^}
Summaries
Europe (IFPI)	Platinum	1,000,000^{*}
^{*} Sales figures based on certification alone.^{^} Shipments figures based on certification alone.^{‡} Sales+streaming figures based on certification alone.
