= From Mediterranea with Love =

EP by Duran Duran
- Released: 23 December 2010 (Europe)
- Genre: New wave; pop rock
- Label: Tape Modern; Allido
- Producer: Mark Ronson; Duran Duran

Duran Duran chronology
All You Need Is Now (2010)	From Mediterranea with Love (2010)	A Diamond in the Mind: Live 2011 (2012)

From Mediterranea with Love is a 3-track EP by the English pop rock band Duran Duran, released as a download on iTunes for several European countries on 23 December 2010.

The EP includes the title track "Mediterranea", produced by Mark Ronson during sessions for the All You Need Is Now album in 2010. Released near Christmas, the EP also includes two live recordings and artwork based on images created by Clunie Reid with graphic design by Pop magazine. The EP was made available as a free download on iTunes for one day only in December 2010.

While a previously unreleased track at the time the EP came out, "Mediterranea" was later included in an expanded version of All You Need Is Now in March 2011.

== Track listing ==
1. "Mediterranea"
2. "(Reach Up for The) Sunrise" (live)
3. "Ordinary World" (live)

== Personnel ==
Duran Duran

- Simon Le Bon – vocals
- John Taylor – bass
- Nick Rhodes – keyboards
- Roger Taylor – drums

Additional musicians

- Dominic Brown – guitar
