= The Essential Collection (Duran Duran album) =

Compilation album by Duran Duran
- Released: 20 March 2000
- Recorded: 1980–1984
- Genre: Rock, new wave
- Length: 74:25
- Label: EMI
- Producer: Various

Professional ratings
Review scores
Source	Rating
The Encyclopedia of Popular Music	3/5 stars

The Essential Collection is a compilation album released in 2000 by the English pop rock band Duran Duran. It was re-released in 2007 and almost exclusively covers material from their first two albums, Duran Duran and Rio.

== Track listing ==
1. "Girls on Film" – 3:28
2. "Planet Earth" – 3:56
3. "Fame" – 3:19
4. "Careless Memories" – 3:53
5. "Anyone Out There" – 4:01
6. "Sound of Thunder" – 4:05
7. "Is There Something I Should Know?" – 4:10
8. "Like an Angel" – 4:46
9. "Hold Back the Rain" – 3:48
10. "Save a Prayer" (US Single Version) – 3:46
11. "My Own Way" – 4:50
12. "Rio" (US Edit) – 4:45
13. "New Religion" – 4:00
14. "The Chauffeur" – 5:12
15. "Hungry Like the Wolf" (Single Version) – 3:24
16. "Lonely in Your Nightmare" – 3:48
17. "Last Chance on the Stairway" – 4:19
18. "Make Me Smile (Come Up and See Me)" (Live) – 4:55
