= Duran Duran (1983 video) =

Video compilation by Duran Duran

Video by Duran Duran
- Released: March 1983
- Recorded: 1981–1983
- Genres: Dance, new wave
- Length: 55 min
- Label: PMI
- Directors: Russell Mulcahy, Perry Haines, Ian Emes, Godley & Creme
- Producer: Duran Duran

Duran Duran chronology
Duran Duran Video 45 (1983)	Duran Duran (1983)	Dancing on the Valentine (1984)

Duran Duran is a video compilation, by the band of the same name, that is sometimes unofficially referred to in print as the Duran Duran video album or Duran Duran: The First 11 Videos. The pioneering video album won a 1984 Grammy Award for Best Long Form Music Video and was certified gold by the Recording Industry Association of America (Billboard magazine for the week ending 24 November 1984).

== Background ==
The planning for the "video album" had begun early in the band's career, as Duran Duran and their management realised the power of video as an artistic marketing tool. Some of the videos shot during this period (1981–1983) were for songs never released as singles, including "Lonely in your Nightmare", "Night Boat" and "The Chauffeur".

The release date, March 1983, was chosen to coincide with the promotion of the band's No. 1 single "Is There Something I Should Know?" and the American re-issue of their first album, Duran Duran.

Future filmmaker Russell Mulcahy directed the majority of this "travelogue-style" collection of videos, featuring exotic locations and cinematic style that made Duran Duran's name as a video band. Videos for tracks such as "Hungry Like the Wolf" and "Save a Prayer" were showpieces of this style.

Prior to the video album's release, the "video EP" Duran Duran Video 45 came out in two versions. The first one had the "clean" or "day version" of "Girls on Film" alongside "Hungry Like The Wolf", while the other had the uncensored "night versions" of each.

In February 1984, the video album Duran Duran won a Grammy Award for Best Long Form Music Video, while Video 45 won the Best Short Form award.

The collection was originally released with stereophonic sound on LaserDisc (the original optical disc format) and Capacitance Electronic Disc formats, as well as in the Beta Hi-Fi and VHS Hi-Fi videotape formats. It has yet to be released on DVD, although Sing Blue Silver, Duran Duran's 1984 tour documentary, and Arena, a 1985 long-form music video/concert film, both have been.

== The videos ==
=== "Rio" (Russell Mulcahy) ===
Duran Duran travelled to the island of Antigua in May 1982 to film the music video for "Rio", which featured iconic images of the band in colourful Antony Price silk suits, singing and playing around on a yacht sailing the Caribbean. Short segments show band members trying to live out their assorted daydreams, only to be teased, tormented, and made fools of by a body-painted vixen.

=== "Planet Earth" (Russell Mulcahy) ===
Fairly primitive by the band's later standards, the video was shot on a sound stage at St John's Wood and features the band (dressed in New Romantic fashions) playing the song on a white stage tricked out with special effects to look like a platform made of ice or crystal. Interspersed with the performance are shots of the band members alongside the four elements. The video focused closely on the band members' faces, highlighting their varied good looks. The instrumental middle section features friends of the band from the Rum Runner nightclub, dancing in outlandish outfits. At the end of the video, singer Simon Le Bon leaps from the stage, caught in a freeze frame shot above an apparently bottomless abyss.

=== "Lonely in Your Nightmare" (Russell Mulcahy) ===
The video begins with Le Bon finding an old photograph of the aforementioned freeze-frame closing of the "Planet Earth" video on the floor of an abandoned building in London. The scene segues into a lovely yet melancholy album track containing a series of colour sections, in which a beautiful woman in a flowing dress wanders about the tropical settings of Sri Lanka, drawing the attention of various band members. Many of the scenes are shot across the Unawatuna Bay from Galle Fort, a UNESCO World Heritage Site, and of the mansion at Taprobane Island further along the southeast coast. The elusive woman appears again in black-and-white scenes filmed in London, disappearing whenever the band members turn to look for her. The music for the video is the David Kershenbaum re-mix of the studio track, which contains an alternate chorus lyric in the closing section of the song.

=== "Careless Memories" (Perry Haines) ===
The video was filmed in a decorated flat and on the streets around London's Soho. The band members talk and laugh while Le Bon sings savagely to the camera. The video was re-edited for the video album, with some scenes replaced.

=== "My Own Way" (Russell Mulcahy) ===
The video was filmed in a St. Johns Wood studio that was decorated entirely in red, black and white. The band performs the fast-paced song in close-up, while flamenco dancers twirl in the background and a colourful parrot sits on the synthesisers, pecking at the keyboardist's fingers.

=== "Hungry Like the Wolf" (Russell Mulcahy) ===
The lush and cinematic video filmed in Sri Lanka was filled with shots of jungles, rivers, elephants, cafes and marketplaces evoking the exotic atmosphere of swashbuckler adventure films like Gunga Din and Raiders of the Lost Ark. The storyline reflects the lyrics "I'm on the hunt, I'm after you," with Le Bon pursuing a tiger-like woman through obstacles in the jungle, culminating in a final chase and struggle in a clearing. In the meantime, other band members hunt for Le Bon. One shot of Le Bon's head rising out of the water in slow motion (it was actually filmed backwards) is an homage to an identical shot in Apocalypse Now. Scenes were shot at the night markets of the capital city of Colombo, the Pinnawala Elephant Orphanage and Yala National Park, home to much of Sri Lanka's leopard population, as reflected in the leopard-woman depicted in the video. The imagery itself is a reference to an ancient Sri Lankan legend of a demonic figure, appearing as a female leopard bent on seducing men and subsequently devouring them. A contemporary reference to this legend can be found in Sri Lankan-born author Christopher Ondaatje's book The Last Colonial. Contrary to the track's title, there are no wolves in Sri Lanka.

=== "Night Boat" (Russell Mulcahy) ===
The video for the atmospheric track became a mini-horror film shot on the Caribbean island of Antigua. Brief dialogue before the music starts includes Le Bon's recitation of one of Mercutio's speeches from Romeo and Juliet. Band members gather in a small beach village as the sun sets, only to be separated and set upon by zombies one by one, until the ragged night boat arrives to carry Le Bon away. It is possible that this video is a homage to the Italian horror film Zombi 2, with settings and zombies that look very much like those in the film. This video was filmed in May 1982, a year before Michael Jackson began working on the video "Thriller", which also featured zombies.

=== "Girls on Film" (Godley & Creme) ===
The hit single was accompanied by an audacious video filmed at Shepperton Studios in July 1981. The 1983 video album contains the uncensored full-length "night version", which is over six minutes in length. The band performs on an elevated stage behind a model's catwalk, which resembles a boxing ring, as various scantily clad women act out a series of erotic vignettes. A number of these scenarios feature mild depictions of BDSM and lesbian fetishes as well as a recurring theme of seduction and abandonment:

- Two models in sheer black camisoles and knickers mount the catwalk carrying pillows. They bestride a feather-covered phallic pole at either end and move toward the center, sliding their crotches along the horizontal candy-striped shaft in a slow and suggestive manner. They then engage in a spirited pillow fight that dislodges one of their camisole spaghetti straps to reveal a wayward nude breast. Afterward, they kiss and return to their dressing room and pour champagne on each other's cleavage.
- The next scene seems a kinky variation on David and Goliath: a lean, supple, petite female sumo wrestler with her hair flared up in a tall tophawk ponytail (the last detail is probably meant to evoke the traditional chonmage topknot required of Japanese sumo wrestlers) mounts the catwalk to confront a stereotypically large, lumbering, heavyset male sumo wrestler. Her clinging wet top emphasises her ample breasts and nipples, while a closeup from behind of her mawashi loincloth affords a fetishistic view of her firm and shapely bare buttocks. In the confrontational tachi-ai stance, she seizes her opponent by the shoulder and flips him forward head-over-heels. He somersaults and lands on his backside with a resounding thud and she gives the ceremonial rei salutation (i.e., a bow) and walks away victorious.
- A masseuse in a white nurse's uniform with white garter suspenders and sheer white stockings administers a full-body hot-oil massage to the humiliated male sumo wrestler on a steam-bath table.
- A sexy blonde in a cowgirl costume "rides" on the back of a muscular G-string-wearing black male model who is fetishistically costumed as an equine. She later soaps his undulating semi-nude body with a wet sponge and then leads him on a leash while he cavorts behind her.
- A model wearing a one-piece swimsuit and high-heels struts and poses on the catwalk before falling backwards into a child's inflatable plastic paddling pool and collapsing. She is "rescued" and revived by a handsome male lifeguard. (It has often been erroneously stated that the lifeguard was played by Le Bon, when in fact it was an uncredited model.) She responds by embracing and kissing the lifeguard so intensely that he becomes unconscious from exhaustion and is left lying in the pool while she walks away. The model is later seen reclining on a chair completely nude, drying herself with an electric blow dryer before rubbing ice cubes on her nipples closeup.
- A brunette model removes her fur coat to reveal her breasts and skintight see-through plastic knickers underneath. She mud-wrestles with a blonde wearing a one-piece swimsuit. The blonde is defeated and left to wallow in the mud, while the triumphant brunette is attended by an obliging male assistant who proceeds to spray the mud off her nude body with a water hose. An alternative cut that does not appear in the video album shows the 2 women waving at the camera and the band holding a sign reading "Some people will do anything to sell records".

=== "Save a Prayer" (Russell Mulcahy) ===
"Save a Prayer" was also filmed among the jungles, beaches, and temples of Sri Lanka. Band members sing the song while interacting with the Sri Lankan people around their tents and fishing boats on the beach, much of which is shot at Unawatuna and Talpe, on the south coast. Le Bon slow dances with, and attempts to woo, a beautiful woman who eventually leaves him. Scenes of band members atop the rock fortress of Sigiriya and among the ruins of a Buddhist temple at Polonnaruwa are intercut with images of the island and its people. The band made the ascent to the top of Sigiriya by helicopter. The fishing boats depicted are still used today, and the general scenery of the Unawatuna beach areas remains much as it did when the video first aired.

=== "The Chauffeur" (Ian Emes) ===
This video is the only one on the album in which the band do not appear at all. It was filmed around Notting Hill during the autumn of 1982, while the band was away on tour. A moody, elegant black-and-white piece inspired by the fetishistic imagery of Helmut Newton, the production was entirely conceived, designed, photographed and edited by renowned British animation director Ian Emes. The video is a fantasy of two mysterious, hauntingly beautiful women who are seen ritualistically dressing themselves in elaborate lingerie before travelling separately through the dark streets and tunnels of London to meet in a vacant underground car park for an exotic lesbian encounter. The song's dramatic instrumental finale was accompanied by a topless Perri Lister as the female chauffeur performing a sensuous dance – an homage to Charlotte Rampling's "Dance of the Seven Veils" in Liliana Cavani's 1974 film The Night Porter.

=== "Is There Something I Should Know?" (Russell Mulcahy) ===
The much-played video features colour clips of the band members in blue shirts with tucked-in white ties, interspersed with surreal black-and-white images of bowler-hatted men inspired by Magritte's paintings. The video, which is longer than the studio track, also includes brief clips from several of the other videos in this collection.

== Track listing ==
1. "Rio" (Antigua) – 5:02
2. "Planet Earth" – St John's Wood) (3:49)
3. "Lonely in Your Nightmare" (London and Sri Lanka) – 4:49
4. "Careless Memories" (Soho) – 3:40
5. "My Own Way" – St John's Wood) (3:33
6. "Hungry Like the Wolf" (Sri Lanka) – 3:37
7. "Night Boat" (Antigua) – 5:11
8. "Girls on Film (Uncensored)" (Shepperton Studios) – 6:11
9. "Save a Prayer" (Sri Lanka) – 6:03
10. "The Chauffeur" (Uncensored) (London) – 4:57
11. "Is There Something I Should Know?" (London) – 4:25
