= Sing Blue Silver =

Video by Duran Duran
- Released: 1984 (VHS, LaserDisc); 5 April 2004 (DVD)
- Recorded: 1984
- Genre: Dance; new wave
- Length: 85 minutes
- Label: EMI
- Director: Michael Collins

Duran Duran chronology
Dancing on the Valentine (1984)	Sing Blue Silver (1984)	Arena (An Absurd Notion) (1984)

Sing Blue Silver is a documentary about Duran Duran's 1983–1984 world tour directed by Michael Collins. A sixty-minute edited version of the documentary was aired on MTV (and later other music channels) under the title Blue Silver.

Sing Blue Silver was originally released on videotape (in VHS and Betamax formats) and on LaserDisc, near the end of 1984. It was re-issued on DVD in April 2004. A 1984 book of the same name featured still photography by official tour photographer Denis O'Regan. The title comes from a verse from the song "The Chauffeur", released in 1982. It was certified gold by the RIAA (Billboard magazine week ending February 23, 1985).

== Synopsis ==
Filmed at the height of their fame, Sing Blue Silver follows the band around Canada and the United States for three months from 30 January to 17 April 1984 as they toured in support of their Seven and the Ragged Tiger album around North America.

The documentary features much footage of the band live on stage, with other standout moments including a Francesco Scavullo photo shoot in New York, meeting a couple of L.A. Raiders players backstage, and a Beatles-style press conference tinged with a bit of comedy. It also captures the band in more candid moments, from backstage antics to trying to stay entertained on the journey between cities.

The film also documented the band's teen idol status, showing hordes of hysterical young—mainly female—fans attempting to cope with seeing their heroes live in an arena.

Live footage from this tour was later used for the Arena (An Absurd Notion) long-form video and the As the Lights Go Down concert video. The video for "The Reflex" was shot at Maple Leaf Gardens in Toronto on 5 March 1984.

Michael Collins left the tour after the first few weeks.

== Track listing ==
=== DVD ===
1. Intro
2. Press Conference
3. Load In/Backstage
4. "Is There Something I Should Know?"
5. Meeting the L.A. Raiders
6. On the Road Again/"Planet Earth"
7. John on Touring
8. Simon & Nick on Image & Recording
9. In New York
10. Francesco Scavullo: Photo Shoot
11. Back on the Road
12. "Girls on Film"
13. Coca-Cola Press Conference
14. Visit to the F.B.I.
15. Discussing Filming/"The Seventh Stranger"
16. In New Orleans
17. "Save a Prayer"
18. Oakland, California
19. Soundcheck/Backstage
20. "Hungry Like the Wolf"
21. "Careless Memories"
22. The End of the Tour
23. Credits

== Personnel ==
Duran Duran

- Simon Le Bon – lead vocals
- Andy Taylor – guitar
- John Taylor – bass
- Roger Taylor – drums
- Nick Rhodes – keyboards and synthesizers
