= 6ix by 3hree =

Video by Duran Duran
- Released: 1989
- Recorded: 1986–1988
- Genre: Dance; new wave
- Length: 24 minutes
- Label: PMI
- Director: Various

Duran Duran chronology
Working for the Skin Trade (1987)	6ix by 3hree (1989)	Decade (1989)

6ix by 3hree (Six by Three) is a video compilation by English rock band Duran Duran released in 1989 on VHS and LaserDisc. There is currently no commercial DVD release available but the whole compilation was included as an extra on the 2010 DD Fan Club DVD release of Three to Get Ready. The six videos of the title are taken from the band's albums Notorious and Big Thing.

The intent of this release was similar to the Seven and the Ragged Tiger video EP Dancing on the Valentine, mopping up an album's worth (or two albums in this case) of videos and getting them to market. However, the release of Decade a year later meant that most of the videos on both of these compilations were readily available on one release.

6ix by 3hree does include two videos not available on other compilations—"Meet El Presidente" and "Do You Believe in Shame?"—but they were included as extras on the CD/DVD special releases of Notorious and Big Thing, respectively.

== Track listing ==
=== VHS: pmi / mvr 99 0080 3 (uk) ===
1. "Notorious"
2. "Skin Trade"
3. "Meet El Presidente"
4. "I Don't Want Your Love"
5. "All She Wants Is"
6. "Do You Believe in Shame?"
