= Arena (An Absurd Notion) =

Video by Duran Duran
- Released: VHS – March 1985; DVD – 5 April 2004
- Recorded: 1984
- Genre: Dance, new wave
- Length: 124 min 42 sec (DVD)
- Label: PMI
- Director: Russell Mulcahy

Duran Duran chronology
Sing Blue Silver (1984)	Arena (An Absurd Notion) (1985)	The Making of Arena (1985)

Arena (An Absurd Notion) is a concept concert video filmed during the course of Duran Duran's 1984 Sing Blue Silver North American Tour in support of the album Seven and the Ragged Tiger.

== Background ==
Instead of releasing a straight concert video, Duran Duran and director Russell Mulcahy chose to play with the origins of the band's name (the 1968 film Barbarella), and added a storyline and surreal elements that are interwoven with footage of the band performing on stage.

The film's villain, the evil Dr. Durand Durand (played by Milo O'Shea, reprising his role from Barbarella) has crash landed on Earth and is surprised and confused to find teenagers chanting his name. When he discovers that they are not chanting for him, but for an upstart pop group, he sets up shop beneath the concert arena and attempts to wreak havoc on the band that stole his name. Of course, he and his henchmen fail at every turn and Duran Duran continue to perform, seemingly unaware of the evil doctor's plans.

The video also included Russell Mulcahy's long-form video for "The Wild Boys". It was meant to be a teaser for a full-length feature film of the same name, based on the 1971 novel The Wild Boys: A Book of the Dead by William S. Burroughs. However, that film was never made.

The expensive sets for the conceptual portions of Arena and "The Wild Boys" were built at Shepperton Studios. Some of the segments were also filmed at the National Exhibition Centre in Birmingham, where free tickets were given to fans.

In addition to O'Shea, the American actress Jennifer Connelly also appears in the video, walking across an empty stage in one segment.

A picture book of the movie, Arena: The Book (ISBN 0-9510118-1-2), was released in 1985.

A live album, also called Arena, was released in late 1984. It featured the two singles "The Wild Boys" and "Save a Prayer (Live)". The video for "Save a Prayer (Live)" is included as a DVD extra on the 2004 Arena DVD release.

The DVD for Arena was released in April 2004 and includes as an extra The Making of Arena behind the scenes documentary that was originally released as a separate videotape.

A 2-in-1 DVD set with both Arena and Sing Blue Silver has also been released by EMI.

== As the Lights Go Down ==
The Oakland, California concerts that were filmed for Arena (An Absurd Notion) were also edited to form the one-hour As the Lights Go Down concert video.

As the Lights Go Down is essentially the Arena video with only the music, although the live footage for many songs was edited differently. This version was never released on any consumer video format and was only broadcast on television, first on Cinemax then later on MTV and other TV channels.

== DVD track listing ==
=== Arena (An Absurd Notion) ===
1. The Return of Duran Duran (the story of Dr. Duran and the band)
2. "Is There Something I Should Know?"
3. "Hungry Like the Wolf"
4. "Union of the Snake"
5. "Save a Prayer"
6. "The Wild Boys" (Uncut Version)
7. "Planet Earth"
8. "Careless Memories"
9. "Girls on Film"
10. "The Reflex" (a remix version of the song)
11. "Rio" (with the film credits overlaid)

Running time: 60 minutes

=== The Making of Arena ===
1. Introduction
2. Concepts and windmills
3. Costumes, choreography and make-up
4. Hanging around with robots
5. Milo and stilts
6. Blowing it all up

Running time: 49 minutes

=== Extras ===
1. Arena TV ad
2. Arena trailer
3. Arena video mix
4. "Save a Prayer (Live)"
5. Simon Le Bon interview

== Personnel ==
Duran Duran

- Simon Le Bon – lead vocals
- Andy Taylor – guitar
- John Taylor – bass
- Roger Taylor – drums
- Nick Rhodes – keyboards and synthesizers
