= All You Need Is Now (tour) =

2011–12 concert tour by Duran Duran

- World tour by Duran Duran
- Location: North America; Europe; South America; Asia; Oceania
- Associated album: All You Need Is Now
- Start date: 3 February 2011
- End date: 1 September 2012
- Legs: 10
- No. of shows: 101 (+ 9 cancelled)

Duran Duran concert chronology
- The Summer Tour (2009); All You Need Is Now (2011–12); 2015 Tour (2015)

All You Need Is Now was a worldwide concert tour by English new wave band Duran Duran in support of the group's 13th studio album of the same name, which was released exclusively on iTunes on 21 December 2010 and the expanded physical album and various format special packages was released on 22 March 2011. It officially started on 3 February 2011 in Grand Prairie, Texas.

The Manchester concert on 16 December 2011 was filmed and recorded for the video and audio release A Diamond in the Mind: Live 2011.

== Support acts ==
- Royseven – (Dublin)
- CocknBullKid – (United Kingdom)
- A Silent Express – (Munich, Leipzig, Dortmund & Berlin)

== Tour dates ==
List of 2011 concerts
Date	City	Country	Venue
3 February 2011	Grand Prairie	United States	Verizon Theatre at Grand Prairie (Pepsi Super Bowl Fan Jam)
25 February 2011	Milan	Italy	Teatro Dal Verme
7 March 2011	London	England	Shepherd's Bush Empire
16 March 2011	Austin	United States	SXSW Music Festival
18 March 2011	Thackerville	United States	Winstar World
23 March 2011	Los Angeles	United States	Mayan Theater
25 March 2011	Miami	United States	Bayfront Park (Ultra Music Festival)
2 April 2011	Mashantucket	United States	MGM Grand at Foxwoods
4 April 2011	Atlanta	United States	Center Stage Theater
6 April 2011	Houston	United States	Warehouse Live
8 April 2011	Monterrey	Mexico	Banamex Auditorium
10 April 2011	Guadalajara	Mexico	Telmex Auditorium
11 April 2011	Mexico City	Mexico	National Auditorium
14 April 2011	Pomona	United States	The Fox Theatre
16 April 2011	San Francisco	United States	The Fillmore
17 April 2011	Indio	United States	Empire Polo Club (Coachella Valley Music and Arts Festival)
20 April 2011	Denver	United States	Ogden Theatre
22 April 2011	Minneapolis	United States	Club Epic
23 April 2011	Chicago	United States	House of Blues
25 April 2011	Toronto	Canada	Phoenix Concert Theatre
26 April 2011	Montreal	Canada	Le National
27 April 2011	Boston	United States	Royale Theatre
30 April 2011	La Romana	Dominican Republic	Altos de Chavón Amphitheater
7 May 2011	Zürich	Switzerland	Hallenstadion (NRJ Energy Fashion Night)
1 September 2011	Bournemouth	England	The Bournemouth Old Fire Station
8 September 2011	Cambridge	England	The Cambridge Junction
9 September 2011	Bristol	England	Bristol Trinity
10 September 2011	Oxford	England	The O2 Academy
23 September 2011	Everett	United States	Comcast Arena at Everett
24 September 2011	Portland	United States	Theater of the Clouds
26 September 2011	Saratoga	United States	Mountain Winery
27 September 2011	Los Angeles	United States	Nokia Theatre
30 September 2011	Las Vegas	United States	The Joint
4 October 2011	Broomfield	United States	1stBank Center
6 October 2011	Grand Prairie	United States	Verizon Theatre
7 October 2011	Baton Rouge	United States	River Center Arena
8 October 2011	Mobile	United States	Bayfest
10 October 2011	Clearwater	United States	Ruth Eckerd Hall
11 October 2011	Hollywood	United States	Hard Rock Live
13 October 2011	St. Augustine	United States	St. Augustine Amphitheatre
14 October 2011	Atlanta	United States	Chastain Park Amphitheater
16 October 2011	Washington, D.C.	United States	DAR Constitution Hall
17 October 2011	Upper Darby	United States	Tower Theatre
19 October 2011	Cleveland	United States	Playhouse Square Center
21 October 2011	Chicago	United States	Chicago Theatre
22 October 2011	Windsor	Canada	The Colosseum at Caesars Windsor
23 October 2011	Montreal	Canada	Bell Centre
25 October 2011	New York City	United States	Madison Square Garden
27 October 2011	Toronto	Canada	Air Canada Centre
28 October 2011	Boston	United States	Citi Performing Arts Center
29 October 2011	Atlantic City	United States	The Borgata
13 November 2011	São Paulo	Brazil	SWU Music & Arts
30 November 2011	Brighton	England	The Brighton Centre
1 December 2011	Bournemouth	England	Bournemouth International Centre
2 December 2011	Birmingham	England	LG Arena
4 December 2011	Glasgow	Scotland	SECC
6 December 2011	Nottingham	England	Capital FM Arena
8 December 2011	Cardiff	Wales	Motorpoint Arena Cardiff
10 December 2011	Liverpool	England	Echo Arena
12 December 2011	London	England	The O_{2} Arena
14 December 2011	Sheffield	England	Motorpoint Arena Sheffield
16 December 2011	Manchester	England	Manchester Arena
17 December 2011	Newcastle upon Tyne	England	Metro Radio Arena
20 December 2011	Dublin	Ireland	The O_{2}

List of 2012 concerts
Date	City	Country	Venue
21 January 2012	Klosters	Switzerland	Altitude Festival
23 January 2012	Vienna	Austria	Gasometer
24 January 2012	Munich	Germany	Tonhalle
26 January 2012	Leipzig	Germany	Haus Auensee
28 January 2012	Dortmund	Germany	Westfalenhallen 2
29 January 2012	Brussels	Belgium	Forest National
31 January 2012	Berlin	Germany	Columbiahalle
1 February 2012	Bratislava	Slovakia	Incheba Arena
8 March 2012	Dubai	United Arab Emirates	The Sevens
10 March 2012	Singapore		Singapore Indoor Stadium
12 March 2012	Seoul	South Korea	Olympic Hall
14 March 2012	Hong Kong		AsiaWorld-Arena
17 March 2012	Brisbane	Australia	Brisbane Entertainment Centre
19 March 2012	Melbourne	Australia	Rod Laver Arena
20 March 2012	Adelaide	Australia	Adelaide Entertainment Centre
24 March 2012	Perth	Australia	Sandalford Estate
27 March 2012	Sydney	Australia	Sydney Entertainment Centre
31 March 2012	Hunter Valley	Australia	Tempus Two Winery
28 April 2012	Brasília	Brazil	Convention Centre
30 April 2012	Rio de Janeiro	Brazil	Citibank Hall
2 May 2012	São Paulo	Brazil	Credicard Hall
4 May 2012	Buenos Aires	Argentina	Luna Park
5 May 2012	Buenos Aires	Argentina	Luna Park
8 May 2012	Santiago	Chile	Teatro Caupolicán
25 June 2012	Wrocław	Poland	Musicart
27 June 2012	Prague	Czech Republic	O2 Arena
28 June 2012	Budapest	Hungary	Budapest Sports Arena
6 July 2012	Thessaloniki	Greece	Earth Open Air
7 July 2012	Skopje	Macedonia	Kale Open Air
9 July 2012	Istanbul	Turkey	Küçükçiftlik Park
12 July 2012	Novi Sad	Serbia	Petrovaradin Fortress (Exit)
14 July 2012	Ljubljana	Slovenia	Križanke
16 July 2012	Verona	Italy	Arena di Verona
18 July 2012	Rome	Italy	Stadio Centrale del Tennis (Il Centrale Live)
20 July 2012	Cattolica	Italy	Arena della Regina
21 July 2012	Lucca	Italy	Piazza Napoleone (Lucca Summer Festival)
23 July 2012	Carcassonne	France	Theatre Jean-Deschamps
25 July 2012	Monte Carlo	Monaco	Monte Carlo Sporting Club
27 July 2012	London	England	Hyde Park (BT London Live)
8 August 2012	Saratoga	United States	Mountain Winery
9 August 2012	Saratoga	United States	Mountain Winery
11 August 2012	Costa Mesa	United States	Pacific Amphitheatre
12 August 2012	Tucson	United States	AVA Amphitheater
15 August 2012	Tulsa	United States	Hard Rock Hotel & Casino
17 August 2012	Memphis	United States	Memphis Botanic Garden
18 August 2012	Bilox	United States	Hard Rock Hotel & Casino
19 August 2012	Atlanta	United States	Chastain Park Amphitheatre
21 August 2012	Durham	United States	Durham Performing Arts Center
22 August 2012	Portsmouth	United States	nTelos Wireless Pavilion
24 August 2012	Mashantucket	United States	MGM Grand at Foxwoods
25 August 2012	Atlantic City	United States	Revel Atlantic City
26 August 2012	Pittsburgh	United States	Stage AE
28 August 2012	Kettering	United States	Fraze Pavilion
29 August 2012	Highland Park	United States	Ravinia Park (Ravinia Festival)
31 August 2012	Rama	Canada	Casino Rama
1 September 2012	Rama	Canada	Casino Rama

Cancelled and rescheduled shows

18 May 2011	Newcastle, England	Metro Radio Arena	Postponed, rescheduled to 17 December 2011.
19 May 2011	Glasgow, Scotland	SECC	Postponed, rescheduled to 4 December 2011.
21 May 2011	Birmingham, England	LG Arena	Postponed, rescheduled to 2 December 2011.
22 May 2011	Nottingham, England	Capital FM Arena	Postponed, rescheduled to 6 December 2011.
23 May 2011	Liverpool, England	Echo Arena	Postponed, rescheduled to 10 December 2011.
26 May 2011	Berlin, Germany	The Admirals Palace	Postponed, rescheduled to 8 June 2011 at a new venue.
28 May 2011	London, England	The O2 Arena	Postponed, rescheduled to 12 December 2011.
30 May 2011	Brighton, England	The Brighton Centre	Postponed, rescheduled to 30 November 2011.
31 May 2011	Bournemouth, England	International Centre	Postponed, rescheduled to 1 December 2011.
1 June 2011	Cardiff, Wales	Motorpoint Arena	Postponed, rescheduled to 8 December 2011.
3 June 2011	Manchester, England	Manchester Arena	Postponed, rescheduled to 16 December 2011.
4 June 2011	Sheffield, England	Motorpoint Arena	Postponed, rescheduled to 14 December 2011.
11 June 2011	The Hague, Netherlands	ADO Kyocera Stadion	Postponed.
15 June 2011	Gothenburg, Sweden	Trädgår’n	Cancelled.
16 June 2011	Stockholm, Sweden	Cirkus	Postponed.
18 June 2011	Helsinki, Finland	Kaisaniemi Park	Postponed.
21 June 2011	Moscow, Russia	Megasport Arena	Postponed.
23 June 2011	St Petersburg, Russia	The New Arena	Postponed.
14 July 2011	Dublin, Ireland	The O2	Postponed, rescheduled to 20 December 2011.
16 July 2011	London, England	iTunes Festival	Cancelled.
18 July 2011	Leipzig, Germany	Parkbuhne	Postponed, rescheduled to 26 January 2012 at Haus Auensee.
19 July 2011	Munich, Germany	Tonhalle	Postponed, rescheduled to 24 January 2012.
20 July 2011	Vienna, Austria	Gasomoter	Postponed, rescheduled to 23 January 2012.
22 July 2011	Padova, Italy	Piazzola	Postponed.
23 July 2011	Milan, Italy	Arena Civica	Postponed.
24 July 2011	Savoia, Italy	Saline Di Margherita	Postponed.
26 July 2011	Thessalonika, Greece	Earth Open Air Theatre	Postponed, rescheduled to 6 July 2012.
28 July 2011	Istanbul, Turkey	Kacuk Ciftlik Park	Postponed.
30 July 2011	Tel Aviv, Israel	Expo Grounds	Postponed.
1 August 2011	Agia Napa, Cyprus	Municipal Stadium	Postponed.
4 August 2011	Vienna, Austria	Gasomoter	Postponed, rescheduled to 23 January 2012.
6 August 2011	Schaffhausen, Switzerland	Das Festival	Cancelled.
8 August 2011	Mallorca, Spain	Plaza de Toros	Postponed.
10 August 2011	Málaga, Spain	Plaza de Toros	Postponed.
12 August 2011	Ibiza, Spain	Amnesia (I Want My MTV)	Cancelled.
16 August 2011	Albufeira, Portugal	Salgados Golf Hotel	Postponed.
20 August 2011	Staffordshire, England	V Festival	Cancelled.
21 August 2011	Chelmsford, England	V Festival	Cancelled.
26 August 2011	Langesund, Norway	Wightgaarden	Postponed.
27 August 2011	Oslo, Norway	Festningen Festival	Cancelled.
28 August 2011	Bergen, Norway	Grieghallen	Postponed.
2 September 2011	The Hague, The Netherlands	Ado Kyocera Stadion	Postponed.
8 September 2011	Copenhagen, Denmark	Tivoli Gardens	Postponed.
10 September 2011	Brussels, Belgium	Forest National	Postponed, rescheduled to 29 January 2012.
12 September 2011	Paris, France	Le Grand Rex	Postponed.
31 August 2012	Rama, Canada	Casino Rama	Cancelled
1 September 2012	Rama, Canada	Casino Rama	Cancelled

== Broadcasts ==
The live performance at the Mayan Theater in Los Angeles was filmed by David Lynch for American Express' Unstaged concert series and streamed live on YouTube on 23 March 2011. It made use of three simultaneous cameras from different positions within the theater.

== Band members ==
=== Duran Duran ===
- Simon Le Bon – lead vocals
- John Taylor – bass, backing vocals
- Roger Taylor – drums
- Nick Rhodes – keyboards, backing vocals

=== Additional musicians ===
- Dominic Brown – guitar, backing vocals
- Simon Willescroft – tenor saxophone, percussion
- Anna Ross – backing vocals
- Chastity Ashley – percussion (2011 North America dates)
- Dawne Adams – percussion (2011 United Kingdom dates)

== Guest artists ==
- Beth Ditto
- Mark Ronson
- Kelis
- Gerard Way

== See also ==
- List of Duran Duran concert tours
