= Live at Hammersmith '82! =

Live album by Duran Duran
- Released: 21 September 2009
- Recorded: 16 November 1982
- Venue: Hammersmith Odeon
- Genre: New wave
- Length: 55:00 (LP); 69:51 (CD)
- Label: EMI – DDLIVEX82

Duran Duran chronology
Red Carpet Massacre (2007)	Live at Hammersmith '82! (2009)	All You Need Is Now (2010)

Professional ratings
Review scores
Source	Rating
Pitchfork	7.7/10
PopMatters	8/10 stars

Live at Hammersmith '82! is a live album by the English pop rock band Duran Duran. Originally recorded at the Hammersmith Odeon on 16 November 1982, it was released by EMI Records on 21 September 2009 (6 October 2009 in the U.S.) as a CD/DVD double pack.

The set was the third of three nights at the Hammersmith Odeon. The show was released in various ways, including as a King Biscuit Flower Hour vinyl release and various bootlegs, including "Planet Heart".

The live version of "Make Me Smile (Come Up and See Me)", originally from Steve Harley & Cockney Rebel, was eventually released as the UK B-side to "The Reflex".

The CD/DVD release is supplemented by extra archive DVD content not previously released on DVD, including all six videos made for tracks off the Rio album, as well as two archived Top of the Pops performances.

The release date of Live at Hammersmith '82! coincides with the release of the two-disc (both CD and heavyweight vinyl) special editions of Rio.

For Black Friday Record Store Day 2022, Live at Hammersmith '82! was reissued on gold double vinyl edition limited to 4500 copies worldwide.

== Track listing ==
=== 2×LP (Reissue, 40th Anniversary Edition): Parlophone ===
Side one
No.	Title	Length
1.	"Rio"	5:50
2.	"Hungry Like the Wolf"	4:13
3.	"Night Boat"	5:10

Side two
No.	Title	Length
4.	"New Religion"	5:51
5.	"Save a Prayer"	6:24
6.	"Planet Earth"	4:43

Side three
No.	Title	Length
7.	"Friends of Mine"	5:22
8.	"Careless Memories"	4:45

Side four
No.	Title	Length
9.	"Make Me Smile (Come Up and See Me)"	5:33
10.	"Girls on Film"	7:09
Total length:		55:00

=== CD/DVD: EMI ===
No.	Title	Length
1.	"Rio"	5:51
2.	"Hungry Like the Wolf"	4:12
3.	"Night Boat"	5:09
4.	"New Religion"	5:52
5.	"Save a Prayer"	6:23
6.	"Planet Earth"	4:43
7.	"Friends of Mine"	5:23
8.	"Careless Memories"	4:44
9.	"Make Me Smile (Come Up and See Me)"	5:34
10.	"Girls on Film"	7:07

DVD extras
No.	Title	Length
1.	"My Own Way"	3:41
2.	"Hungry Like the Wolf"	3:42
3.	"Save a Prayer"	6:06
4.	"Lonely in Your Nightmare"	4:51
5.	"Rio"	5:05
6.	"The Chauffeur"	4:57
7.	"Hungry Like the Wolf" (Top of the Pops, 13 May 1982)	3:31
8.	"Rio" (Top of the Pops, 18 November 1982)	4:35
