= Free to Love (song) =

Single by Duran Duran featuring Nile Rodgers
- Released: 23 April 2026
- Genre: Disco-pop; synth-pop
- Length: 3:05
- Label: Tape Modern
- Songwriters: Simon Le Bon; John Taylor; Roger Taylor; Nick Rhodes; Nile Rodgers
- Producers: Duran Duran; Joshua Blair; Nile Rodgers

Duran Duran singles chronology
"Shadows on Your Side" (2025)	"Free to Love" (2026)

Music video
- "Free to Love" on YouTube

"Free to Love" is a song by the English pop rock band Duran Duran. It was released on 23 April 2026 as an outtake from their sixteenth studio album, Danse Macabre (2023), and their fiftieth single overall.

Duran Duran performed the song publicly for the first time on Jimmy Kimmel Live! with Nile Rodgers. The song charted in multiple countries, marking the first time that has happened since Pressure Off (2015).

A remix album, Free to Love: Hot Star Remixes, was released on 26 June 2026, alongside the announcement that a physical release that would feature two bonus remixes and the instrumental version of the song.

== Background and development ==
Around the time of the Danse Macabre sessions, John Taylor recalls, "We wanted a new song or two, and Nile came into London and we put some sketches down and a couple of the songs made the cut. And there was one idea that we hadn't and it was just sitting on a hard drive somewhere". After the sessions, Taylor showed off to the song Rhodes who shared it with the rest of the band who were on board with finishing the song.

== Free to Love: Hot Star Mixes ==
1. Free To Love (Horse Meat Disco Remix) – 2:55
2. Free To Love (Harrison Remix) – 3:30
3. Free To Love (DJWS & THE DISCO_NECT Remix by DJ White Shadow) – 3:08
4. Free To Love (ALISSIA Remix) – 3:29
5. Free To Love (Biff Chitlins Agape Remix) – 4:20
6. Free To Love (Inner Galactic Remix by BastienkHz) – 4:55
7. Free To Love (Jersey Black Cat Remix by BastienkHz) – 3:43
8. Free To Love (Trixie Mattel Remix) – 3:40

== Reception ==
The song has received positive reviews from critics, with The AU Review calling the song "funky, groovy, and immensely joyful", and Billboard saying the song was "an ode to the era of party music that exploded from the late '70s, when tight rhythm sections collided with funk and glitter on the dancefloor".

== Music video ==
A music video inspired by Top of the Pops was released alongside the song, directed by Jonas Akerlund and featuring Clara Afmo as an announcer similarly to Top of the Pops programming.

== Charts ==
Chart performance
Chart (2026)	Peak position
Croatia International Airplay (Top lista)	83
North Macedonia Airplay (Radiomonitor)	7
Uruguay Anglo Airplay (Monitor Latino)	15
