= A Diamond in the Mind: Live 2011 =

Live album by Duran Duran
- Released: 2 July 2012
- Recorded: 16 December 2011
- Venue: Manchester Arena (Manchester, England)
- Label: Eagle
- Director: Gavin Elder

Duran Duran chronology
All You Need Is Now (2010)	A Diamond in the Mind: Live 2011 (2012)	Paper Gods (2015)

A Diamond in the Mind: Live 2011 is a concert film and live album by the English pop rock band Duran Duran. It was filmed at the Manchester Arena in Manchester, England on 16 December 2011 during the All You Need Is Now tour and released on 2 July 2012 on Blu-ray, DVD and CD and on handcrafted limited edition double LP vinyl of 2000 copies released through the Vinyl Factory.

== Track listing ==
=== DVD ===
1. "Return to Now" (intro)
2. "Before the Rain"
3. "Planet Earth"
4. "A View to a Kill"
5. "All You Need Is Now"
6. "Blame the Machines"
7. "Safe (In the Heat of the Moment)"
8. "The Reflex"
9. "The Man Who Stole a Leopard"
10. "Girl Panic!"
11. "White Lines (Don't Do It)"
12. "Careless Memories"
13. "Ordinary World"
14. "Notorious"
15. "Hungry Like the Wolf"
16. "(Reach Up for The) Sunrise"
17. "The Wild Boys" / "Relax"
18. "Rio"
19. "A Diamond in the Mind" (credits)

==== Bonus features ====
1. Duran Duran 2011 (documentary)
2. "Come Undone"
3. "Is There Something I Should Know?"
4. "Tiger Tiger" (exclusive to the Japanese releases)

=== CD ===
1. "Before the Rain"
2. "Planet Earth"
3. "A View to a Kill"
4. "All You Need Is Now"
5. "Come Undone"
6. "Blame the Machines"
7. "The Reflex"
8. "Girl Panic!"
9. "Is There Something I Should Know?"
10. "Ordinary World"
11. "Notorious"
12. "Hungry Like the Wolf"
13. "(Reach Up for The) Sunrise"
14. "The Wild Boys" / "Relax"
15. "Rio"

== Musicians ==
=== Duran Duran ===
- Simon Le Bon – lead vocals
- John Taylor – bass, backing vocals
- Nick Rhodes – keyboards, backing vocals
- Roger Taylor – drums

=== Additional ===
- Dom Brown – guitar, backing vocals
- Simon Willescroft – saxophone, keyboards
- Anna Ross – backing vocals, duet vocals ("Safe (In the Heat of the Moment)", "The Man Who Stole a Leopard" and "Come Undone")
- Dawne Adams – percussion

== Charts ==
Chart performance for A Diamond in the Mind: Live 2011
Chart (2012)	Peak position
Belgian Albums (Ultratop Wallonia)	112
German Albums (Offizielle Top 100)	59
Italian Albums (FIMI)	40
