= Dancing on the Valentine =

Video by Duran Duran
- Released: October 1984
- Recorded: 1983–1984
- Genre: Dance; new wave
- Length: 15 minutes
- Label: PMI (UK); Sony, Pioneer Artists (US)
- Director: Russell Mulcahy; Simon Milne; Brian Grant
- Producer: Duran Duran

Duran Duran chronology
Duran Duran (1983)	Dancing on the Valentine (1984)	Sing Blue Silver (1984)

Dancing on the Valentine is a video single by English rock band Duran Duran, released by PMI in the UK and Sony in the US in October 1984. It was released on VHS, Betamax, LaserDisc, and Video 8 (8mm) format.

Dancing on the Valentine is a collection of the three videos from Seven and the Ragged Tiger (1983).

The title comes from the lyrics of "The Reflex": "You gone too far this time / But I'm dancing on the valentine". The artwork was also highly influenced by the release of "The Reflex" single, earlier in the year.

A re-release in 1991 combined Dancing on the Valentine with the band's previous two-track Video 45, Duran Duran.

== Track listing ==
=== Video 8: Sony Corporation of America – USA ===
1. "The Reflex" – 4:18 (Toronto)
2. "Union of the Snake" – 4:12 (Sydney)
3. "New Moon on Monday" – 5:25 (Noyers, Bercy, Paris)

=== LaserDisc (8-inch): Pioneer Artists/PA-84-M013 – USA ===
1. "The Reflex" – 4:18 (Toronto)
2. "Union of the Snake" – 4:12 (Sydney)
3. "New Moon on Monday" – 5:25 (Noyers, Bercy, Paris)

=== VHS: PMI / MVT 99 0012 2 – UK ===
1. "Union of the Snake" – 0:20 (Intro)
2. "The Reflex" – 4:18 (Toronto)
3. "Union of the Snake" – 4:12 (Sydney)
4. "New Moon on Monday" – 5:25 (Noyers, Bercy, Paris)

=== VHS: PMI-Video Club / MC 2044 – UK ===
1. "Union of the Snake" – 0:20 (Intro)
2. "The Reflex" – 4:18 (Toronto)
3. "Union of the Snake" – 4:12 (Sydney)
4. "New Moon on Monday" – 5:25 (Noyers, Bercy, Paris)
5. "Hungry Like the Wolf" – 3:37 (Sri Lanka)
6. "Girls on Film" – 3:30 (Shepperton Studios)
- 1991 re-release
