= Decade (Duran Duran album) =

Greatest hits album by Duran Duran
- Released: 13 November 1989
- Recorded: 1980–1988
- Genres: Pop rock; new wave; synth-pop; dance-rock
- Length: 59:50
- Label: EMI
- Producers: Duran Duran; Daniel Abraham; Jason Corsaro; Bernard Edwards; Jonathan Elias; Ian Little; Shep Pettibone; Nile Rodgers; Alex Sadkin; Colin Thurston

Duran Duran chronology
Big Thing (1988)	Decade (1989)	Liberty (1990)

Professional ratings
Review scores
Source	Rating
AllMusic	4.5/5 stars
Christgau’s Consumer Guide	B−
The Encyclopedia of Popular Music	4/5 stars
Number One	5/5 stars
Rolling Stone Album Guide	4/5 stars
Smash Hits	8/10
Spin Alternative Record Guide	9/10

Decade is a greatest hits album by the English pop rock band Duran Duran, released on 13 November 1989.

The remix single "Burning the Ground" was released to radio to promote this album. It was created by producer John Jones by mixing snippets of the band's biggest hits from the previous decade into a new piece of music. However, the track was not included on the Decade album itself. The tracks "My Own Way" and "New Moon on Monday" were also not included, even though both were top 20 hits in the UK.

Decade's track listing included various hits from all of Duran Duran's albums and presented them in mixes that were popular and mainstream among the public. Hence, it includes the Nile Rodgers edit of "The Reflex" and the single edits of "Hungry Like the Wolf", "Notorious", and "Skin Trade", as well as the Shep Pettibone single mix of "I Don't Want Your Love". Although there are many versions and single edits of the song "Rio", the compilation uses the UK album version, as well as the UK single version for "Save a Prayer".

== Track listing ==
Decade – Standard edition
No.	Title	Writer(s)	Producer(s)	Length
1.	"Planet Earth" (from Duran Duran, 1981)	Andy Taylor; John Taylor; Roger Taylor; Nick Rhodes; Simon LeBon	Colin Thurston	4:02
2.	"Girls on Film" (from Duran Duran)	A. Taylor; J. Taylor; R. Taylor; Rhodes; LeBon	Thurston	3:30
3.	"Hungry Like the Wolf" (from Rio, 1982)	A. Taylor; J. Taylor; R. Taylor; Rhodes; LeBon	Thurston	3:27
4.	"Rio" (from Rio)	A. Taylor; J. Taylor; R. Taylor; Rhodes; LeBon	Thurston	5:35
5.	"Save a Prayer" (from Rio)	A. Taylor; J. Taylor; R. Taylor; Rhodes; LeBon	Thurston	5:27
6.	"Is There Something I Should Know?" (non-album single, 1983)	A. Taylor; J. Taylor; R. Taylor; Rhodes; LeBon	Duran Duran; Ian Little	4:10
7.	"Union of the Snake" (from Seven and the Ragged Tiger, 1983)	A. Taylor; J. Taylor; R. Taylor; Rhodes; LeBon	Duran Duran; Little; Alex Sadkin	4:23
8.	"The Reflex" (from Seven and the Ragged Tiger)	A. Taylor; J. Taylor; R. Taylor; Rhodes; LeBon	Duran Duran; Little; Sadkin	4:26
9.	"The Wild Boys" (from Arena, 1984)	A. Taylor; J. Taylor; R. Taylor; Rhodes; LeBon	Duran Duran; Nile Rodgers	4:19
10.	"A View to a Kill" (from A View to a Kill soundtrack, 1985)	A. Taylor; J. Taylor; R. Taylor; Rhodes; LeBon; John Barry	Duran Duran; Bernard Edwards; Jason Corsaro	3:35
11.	"Notorious" (from Notorious, 1986)	J. Taylor; Rhodes; LeBon	Duran Duran; Rodgers	4:01
12.	"Skin Trade" (from Notorious)	J. Taylor; Rhodes; LeBon	Duran Duran; Rodgers	4:28
13.	"I Don't Want Your Love" (from Big Thing, 1988)	J. Taylor; Rhodes; LeBon	Duran Duran; Daniel Abraham; Jonathan Elias	3:50
14.	"All She Wants Is" (from Big Thing)	J. Taylor; Rhodes; LeBon	Duran Duran; Abraham; Elias	4:32
Total length:				59:50

Decade – Brazilian edition
No.	Title	Writer(s)	Album	Length
14.	"A Matter of Feeling"	J. Taylor; Rhodes; Le Bon	Notorious	5:56
Total length:				61:14

Decade – 1995 re-issue bonus VCD – Disc one (music videos)
No.	Title	Director(s)	Length
1.	"Opening titles"		0:56
2.	"Planet Earth"	Russell Mulcahy	4:08
3.	"Girls on Film"	Godley & Creme	6:18
4.	"Hungry Like the Wolf"	Mulcahy	3:48
5.	"Rio"	Mulcahy	5:09
6.	"Save a Prayer"	Mulcahy	6:12
7.	"Is There Something I Should Know?"	Mulcahy	4:41
8.	"Union of the Snake"	Simon Milne	4:21
9.	"The Reflex"	Mulcahy	4:32
10.	"The Wild Boys"	Mulcahy	7:47
11.	"A View to a Kill"	Godley & Creme	4:14

Decade – 1995 re-issue bonus VCD – Disc two (music videos)
No.	Title	Director(s)	Length
1.	"Notorious"	Peter Kagan; Paula Greif	4:03
2.	"Skin Trade"	Kagan; Greif	4:30
3.	"I Don't Want Your Love"	Steve Lowe	3:59
4.	"All She Wants Is"	Dean Chamberlain	4:37
5.	"Violence of Summer (Love's Taking Over)"	Andy Delaney; Monty Whitebloom	4:49
6.	"Serious"	Delaney; Whitebloom	4:02
7.	"Ordinary World"	Nick Egan	4:46
8.	"Come Undone"	Julien Temple	4:52

== Personnel ==
- Daniel Abraham – production, engineering, mixing
- Hans Arnold – illustrations
- John Barry – arrangement, conducting
- Jason Corsaro – production, engineering, mixing
- Duran Duran – production
- Bernard Edwards – production
- Jonathan Elias – production
- Laura Levine – photography
- Ian Little – production, mixing
- Denis O'Regan – photography
- Steve Peck – mixing
- Shep Pettibone – production, mixing
- Nile Rodgers – production, mixing
- Bob Rosa – mixing
- Alex Sadkin – production, mixing
- Stephen Sprouse – illustrations
- Colin Thurston – production, engineering

== Charts ==
=== Weekly charts ===
1989–1990 weekly chart performance for Decade
Chart (1989–1990)	Peak position
Australian Albums (ARIA)	89
Canada Top Albums/CDs (RPM)	81
Dutch Albums (Album Top 100)	84
European Albums (Music & Media)	27
Italian Albums (Musica e dischi)	22
UK Albums (Official Charts)	5
US Billboard 200	67

1996 weekly chart performance for Decade
Chart (1996)	Peak position
Belgian Albums (Ultratop Wallonia)	49

=== Year-end charts ===
Year-end chart performance for Decade
Chart (1989)	Position
UK Albums (Gallup)	84

== Certifications ==
Certifications for Decade
Region	Certification	Certified units/sales
United Kingdom (BPI)	Platinum	300,000^{^}
United States (RIAA)	Platinum	1,000,000^{^}
^{^} Shipments figures based on certification alone.
