= New Moon on Monday =

Single by Duran Duran

from the album Seven and the Ragged Tiger
- B-side: "Tiger Tiger"
- Released: 23 January 1984
- Studio: AIR (Salem, Montserrat)
- Genre: New wave; synth-pop
- Length: 4:16
- Label: EMI; Capitol
- Songwriters: Simon Le Bon; John Taylor; Roger Taylor; Andy Taylor; Nick Rhodes
- Producers: Alex Sadkin; Ian Little; Duran Duran

Duran Duran singles chronology
"Union of the Snake" (1983)	"New Moon on Monday" (1984)	"The Reflex" (1984)

Music video
- "New Moon on Monday" on YouTube

"New Moon on Monday" is the tenth single by the English pop rock band Duran Duran, released on 23 January 1984 in the United Kingdom.

The second single to be taken from the band's third studio album Seven and the Ragged Tiger (1983), the song was another success, reaching the top ten on both the UK and US charts. On 11 February 1984, the single reached number nine on the UK singles chart and on 17 March, it reached number 10 on the US Billboard Hot 100, after entering on 14 January 1984 at number 56.

== Critical reception ==
In a contemporary review, Cash Box said that the song "follows the surefire hit formula" but "the loneliness-themed tune is more lyrical than usual."

In a retrospective review, "New Moon on Monday" was praised by AllMusic journalist Donald A. Guarisco, who wrote: "The music holds the unusual lyrics together by wedding effervescent verse melodies that bounce high and low to a triumphant-sounding chorus with a rousing feel."

== Music video ==
The music video for "New Moon on Monday" was filmed by director Brian Grant during the morning of 7 December 1983 in the village of Noyers in France. It has a loosely sketched storyline in which the band appear as members of an underground resistance movement called "La Luna" (the name is one of the few connections between the video's content and the song lyrics), organizing a revolt against a modern (1980s-era computers are used) oppressive militaristic regime, apparently in France.

"We set out to make a little movie," recalled Grant. "I'm not sure we succeeded." He was not the first choice to shoot the video, as Russell Mulcahy, director of many of the band's other videos, was unavailable.

Several versions of this video exist. The longest is a 17-minute "movie version" which includes an extended introduction before the song starts (including a scene of dialogue between Simon Le Bon and the story's female lead, played by Patricia Barzyk, winner of the Miss France title in 1980; a brief snippet of "Union of the Snake" is also heard on a radio), and is set to an extended remix of the song. A shorter version, with a spoken French-dialogue intro, was originally submitted to MTV, who then later requested an even shorter version without the prologue.

Yet another version was produced for the video collection Dancing on the Valentine (1984), showing blue-lit scenes of the band members in front of a full-moon backdrop. All but one of the versions were included as easter eggs on the 2004 DVD compilation Greatest.

Both guitarist Andy Taylor and keyboardist Nick Rhodes say that this is the band's least favourite music video. "Everybody ... hates it, particularly the dreadful scene at the end where we all dance together," Taylor wrote in his memoirs. "Even today, I cringe and leave the room if anyone plays [it]." He recalls that they were miserable since their Christmas holiday had been cut short to shoot the video, and spent most of the day on the dark and cold set drinking, to the point that he was "half cut" by the time the last scenes were shot. "It's one of the few times I've seen Nick dance."

== B-sides, bonus tracks and remixes ==
"New Moon on Monday" was backed with a remix of "Tiger Tiger", an instrumental track taken from the Seven and the Ragged Tiger album, done by Ian Little. The release was rounded out by an extended version of the title track.

== Re-recording ==
Duran Duran re-recorded the song during sessions for their sixteenth studio album Danse Macabre. The re-recording, entitled "New Moon (Dark Phase)" featured former band member Andy Taylor on guitar. It was released on the deluxe version of Danse Macabre.

== Formats and track listings ==
=== 7": EMI / DURAN 1 United Kingdom ===
1. "New Moon on Monday" – 4:16
2. "Tiger Tiger" (Ian Little remix) – 3:28

=== 12": EMI / 12 DURAN 1 United Kingdom ===
1. "New Moon on Monday" (dance mix) – 6:03 (a.k.a. "extended version")
2. "Tiger Tiger" (Ian Little remix) – 3:28
3. "New Moon on Monday" – 4:16
- Track 3 not listed on sleeve or labels

=== 7": Capitol / B-5309 United States ===
1. "New Moon on Monday" – 4:16
2. "Tiger Tiger" (Ian Little remix) – 3:28

=== 12": Capitol / SPRO-9060 (Promo) United States ===
1. "New Moon on Monday" – 4:16
2. "New Moon on Monday" – 4:16

=== 12": Capitol / SPRO-9080 (Promo) United States ===
1. "New Moon on Monday" (dance mix) – 6:03
2. "New Moon on Monday" (dance mix) – 6:03

=== CD: Part of Singles Box Set 1981–1985 ===
1. "New Moon on Monday" – 4:16
2. "Tiger Tiger" (Ian Little remix) – 3:28
3. "New Moon on Monday" (dance mix) – 6:03 (a.k.a. "extended version")

== Charts ==
=== Weekly charts ===
Weekly chart performance for "New Moon on Monday"
Chart (1984)	Peak position
Australia (ARIA Countdown)	49
Canada Top Singles (RPM)	14
Ireland (IRMA)	5
Israel (IBA)	5
Netherlands (Dutch Top 40)	26
New Zealand (Recorded Music NZ)	32
Spain Airplay (Top 40 Radio)	38
UK Singles (Official Charts)	9
US Billboard Hot 100	10

=== Year-end charts ===
Chart (1984)	Position
US Top Pop Singles (Billboard)	95

== Personnel ==
Duran Duran

- Simon Le Bon – vocals
- Nick Rhodes – keyboards
- John Taylor – bass guitar
- Roger Taylor – drums
- Andy Taylor – guitar

Additional musicians

- Raphael DeJesus – percussion
- Mark Kennedy – percussion

Technical

- Alex Sadkin – producer
- Ian Little – producer
