= All You Need Is Now =

2010 studio album by Duran Duran

Studio album by Duran Duran
- Released: 21 December 2010
- Recorded: February–August 2010
- Studios: Sphere (London); Eastcote (London) (Note: Additional recording); Metropolis (London); Air Edel (London); 6 Nassau (Toronto) (Note: Strings on tracks 7, 8 and 13)
- Genres: New wave; pop rock; synthpunk (Note: Scroll down to Ranking Every Duran Duran album and number 2, "All You Need Is Now".)
- Length: 56:44
- Label: Tape Modern
- Producers: Mark Ronson; Duran Duran

Duran Duran chronology
Live at Hammersmith '82! (2009)	All You Need Is Now (2010)	A Diamond in the Mind: Live 2011 (2012)

Singles from All You Need Is Now
- 1. "All You Need Is Now" Released: 8 December 2010; 2. "Girl Panic!" Released: 16 April 2011

All You Need Is Now is the thirteenth studio album by the English pop rock band Duran Duran. Co-produced by the band and Mark Ronson, a truncated version of the album was released digitally on 21 December 2010. A physical package was released on 21 March 2011 in Europe on the Tape Modern label (distributed by Edel), and on 22 March 2011 in the United States and Canada on S-Curve Records (distributed by Universal).

The album peaked at number 11 in the UK, becoming the band's 13th Top 20 album. It debuted at number 119 on the US Billboard 200 chart on its initial December 2010 digital release, selling 15,000 copies in its first week. It reached number 29 upon its physical release in March 2011. The album had sold 76,000 copies in the US as of August 2015. Duran Duran promoted the album through the All You Need Is Now tour.

== Background and release ==
According to John Taylor, producer Matthew Hager worked on tracks for the March 2011 extended release of the album. Some of these songs are "Networker Nation", released as a bonus track, and "Early Summer Nerves" and "Too Close to the Sun", appearing only on the Best Buy exclusive edition. The Best Buy edition also includes a bonus DVD featuring seven videos.

Nick Rhodes described "This Lost Weekend" as a "slow song" sounding "like Motown", saying it is "nothing like anything on the album". Although it did not make it onto the final track listing, it was included on the deluxe collector's edition of the album, which was made available to order exclusively from The Vinyl Factory, containing five vinyl records. It was also later included on the Japanese two-disc CD version of All You Need Is Now. The Japanese album was released as a stand-alone album and as part of a six-disc combo along with the live concert film A Diamond in the Mind on Blu-ray and DVD video and two-disc live album, with the two-disc All You Need Is Now completing the package.

== Critical reception ==
Professional ratings
Aggregate scores
Source	Rating
Metacritic	74/100
Review scores
Source	Rating
AllMusic	4/5 stars
The A.V. Club	B
The Daily Telegraph	4/5 stars
The Guardian	4/5 stars
Los Angeles Times	2.5/4 stars
Mojo	4/5 stars
NME	7/10
PopMatters	9/10
Rolling Stone	3.5/5 stars
USA Today	3/4 stars

All You Need Is Now currently holds a score of 74 out of 100 on Metacritic, certifying generally favourable reviews. Crispin Kott of PopMatters dubbed it "the best album Duran Duran has released since Rio". Rolling Stone viewed the album as "a return to roots for a band that's all implants – which is part of the album's charm." Sarah Rodman from The Boston Globe praised the album and said "Simon LeBon's still sturdy voice soars over coolly funky backdrops and the grooves are some of the group's most urgent in years." In the March 2011 issue, Mojo gave the album 4 out of 5 (meaning "Brilliant") and stated, "Take Roxy Music, add Kraftwerk, and sprinkle on some Chic, and the result is Duran Duran".

== Singles ==
"All You Need Is Now" was the first single released from the album. It was initially released on iTunes on 8 December 2010 as a free download. The music video is directed by Nick Egan. Several remixes were released as bonus tracks on the album. Because it was released as a free download, the single was ineligible for the UK sales charts. The song peaked at number 38 on Billboard's Adult Pop Songs chart.

The second single, "Girl Panic!", was released as a limited-edition seven-inch single for Record Store Day 2011 (16 April 2011) with a remix by David Lynch. The music video was directed by Jonas Åkerlund and released on 8 November 2011, featuring appearances by Naomi Campbell, Eva Herzigova, Cindy Crawford, Helena Christensen, and Yasmin Le Bon portraying Simon Le Bon, Nick Rhodes, John Taylor, Roger Taylor, and Dominic Brown, respectively.

"Leave a Light On" was released as a promotional single in the United Kingdom. It was officially released for the British market after that BBC Radio 2 apparently refused to play the intended single "Girl Panic!" on the verge of the (later cancelled) UK leg in their new world tour. The song peaked at number 31 on Billboard's Adult Pop Songs chart.

The expanded physical album, including various format special packages, was released in March 2011, only weeks after the 30th anniversary of the band's first release "Planet Earth". The CD features fourteen tracks, including five tracks not included with the original digital release: "Mediterranea", "Other People's Lives", "Too Bad You're So Beautiful", "Diamond in the Mind", and "Return to Now". The album entered the UK chart at No. 11 and the Billboard chart at number 29.

== Track listing ==
Digital release
No.	Title	Writer(s)	Length
1.	"All You Need Is Now"	Duran Duran; Mark Ronson; Dom Brown	4:34
2.	"Blame the Machines"	Duran Duran; Brown	4:11
3.	"Being Followed"	Duran Duran; Brown	3:47
4.	"Leave a Light On"	Duran Duran; Brown	4:36
5.	"Safe (In the Heat of the Moment)" (featuring Ana Matronic)	Duran Duran; Ronson; Brown; Ana Matronic	3:59
6.	"Girl Panic!"	Duran Duran; Ronson; Brown	4:31
7.	"The Man Who Stole a Leopard" (featuring Kelis)	Duran Duran	6:13
8.	"Runway Runaway"	Duran Duran; Brown	3:04
9.	"Before the Rain"	Duran Duran	4:12

Physical release
No.	Title	Writer(s)	Length
1.	"All You Need Is Now"	Duran Duran; Ronson; Brown	4:34
2.	"Blame the Machines"	Duran Duran; Brown	4:11
3.	"Being Followed"	Duran Duran; Brown	3:47
4.	"Leave a Light On"	Duran Duran; Brown	4:36
5.	"Safe (In the Heat of the Moment)" (featuring Ana Matronic)	Duran Duran; Ronson; Brown; Ana Matronic	3:59
6.	"Girl Panic!"	Duran Duran; Ronson; Brown	4:31
7.	"A Diamond in the Mind"	Duran Duran; Ronson; Brown	1:15
8.	"The Man Who Stole a Leopard" (featuring Kelis)	Duran Duran	6:13
9.	"Other People's Lives"	Duran Duran; Ronson; Brown	3:43
10.	"Mediterranea"	Duran Duran; Ronson; Brown	5:38
11.	"Too Bad You're So Beautiful"	Duran Duran; Brown; Nick Hodgson	4:54
12.	"Runway Runaway"	Duran Duran; Brown	3:04
13.	"Return to Now"	Duran Duran; Ronson; Brown	1:33
14.	"Before the Rain"	Duran Duran	4:12

UK deluxe edition bonus tracks
No.	Title	Writer(s)	Length
15.	"Networker Nation"	Duran Duran; Brown	3:10
16.	"All You Need Is Now" (Youth Kills Mix)	Duran Duran; Ronson; Brown	4:55

US deluxe edition bonus track
No.	Title	Writer(s)	Length
15.	"Networker Nation"	Duran Duran; Brown	3:10

Best Buy exclusive deluxe edition bonus tracks
No.	Title	Writer(s)	Length
15.	"Too Close to the Sun"	Duran Duran; Brown	5:15
16.	"Early Summer Nerves"	Duran Duran; Brown	3:03
17.	"Networker Nation"	Duran Duran; Brown	3:10

US deluxe edition bonus DVD
No.	Title	Length
1.	"The Making of All You Need Is Now"
2.	"All You Need Is... Mark Ronson"
3.	"The Art of Clunie Reid"
4.	"On Set of the Photoshoot"
5.	"All You Need Is Now – Official Music Video"
6.	"Behind the Scenes at the Videoshoot"
7.	"Track by Track"

Japanese edition bonus disc
No.	Title	Writer(s)	Length
1.	"Networker Nation"	Duran Duran; Brown	3:11
2.	"Too Close to the Sun"	Duran Duran; Brown	5:15
3.	"Early Summer Nerves"	Duran Duran; Brown	3:03
4.	"This Lost Weekend"	Duran Duran; Brown	3:12
5.	"All You Need Is Now" (Youth Kills Mix)	Duran Duran; Ronson; Brown	4:55

Deluxe collector's edition bonus tracks (vinyl three)
No.	Title	Writer(s)	Length
1.	"Networker Nation"	Duran Duran; Brown	3:11
2.	"This Lost Weekend"	Duran Duran; Brown	3:12
3.	"Too Close to the Sun"	Duran Duran; Brown	5:15
4.	"Early Summer Nerves"	Duran Duran; Brown	3:03

Deluxe collector's edition bonus tracks (vinyl four)
No.	Title	Writer(s)	Length
1.	"All You Need Is Now" (Tom Middleton Cosmos Remix)	Duran Duran; Ronson; Brown	7:54
2.	"All You Need Is Now" (Pablo La Rosa Remix)	Duran Duran; Ronson; Brown	6:03

Deluxe collector's edition bonus tracks (vinyl five)
No.	Title	Writer(s)	Length
1.	"All You Need Is Now" (Youth Kills Mix)	Duran Duran; Ronson; Brown	4:55
2.	"All You Need Is Now" (Youth Kills Alt Doom Mix)	Duran Duran; Ronson; Brown	4:55
3.	"Girl Panic!" (David Lynch Remix)	Duran Duran; Ronson; Brown	4:11
4.	"Girl Panic!" (Johnson Somerset & John Monkman Remix)	Duran Duran; Ronson; Brown	8:30

== Personnel ==
Credits adapted from the liner notes of All You Need Is Now.

=== Duran Duran ===
- Simon Le Bon
- Nick Rhodes
- John Taylor
- Roger Taylor

=== Additional musicians ===
- Dom Brown – guitars, guitar synth
- Ana Matronic – vocals (track 5)
- Kelis – vocals (track 8)
- Owen Pallett – string arrangements, conducting (tracks 7, 8, 13)
- The St. Kitts String Octet – strings (tracks 7, 8, 13)
- Nina Hossain – newscaster (track 8); voice of satellite navigation (track 2)
- Nino Rota – orchestral sample (track 8)
- Franco Ferrara – orchestral sample conducting (tracks 7, 8, 13)
- Anna Ross – female backing vocals (track 3)
- Tawiah – female backing vocals (track 5)
- Mark Ronson – additional chorus guitar (track 4)
- Jamie Walton – cello (tracks 3, 7, 13, 14)

=== Technical ===
- Mark Ronson – production
- Duran Duran – production
- Joshua Blair – recording, editing
- Alalal – additional recording
- Samuel Navel – additional recording, engineering assistance
- Dan Parry – additional recording, engineering assistance
- Nick Taylor – additional recording, engineering assistance
- Mark "Spike" Stent – mixing at Mixsuite (Los Angeles)
- Matty Green – mixing assistance
- Ted Jensen – mastering at Sterling Sound (New York City)
- James Anderson – string recording (tracks 7, 8, 13)

=== Artwork ===
- Clunie Reid – artwork
- Nick Rhodes – original photography
- Rory McCartney – design
- Ashley Heath – art direction
- Rory McCartney – art direction

== Charts ==
Chart performance for All You Need Is Now
Chart (2010–2011)	Peak position
Australian Albums (ARIA)	79
Austrian Albums (Ö3 Austria)	62
Belgian Albums (Ultratop Flanders)	77
Belgian Albums (Ultratop Wallonia)	32
Canadian Albums (Nielsen SoundScan)	52
Czech Albums (ČNS IFPI)	12
Dutch Albums (Album Top 100)	23
German Albums (Offizielle Top 100)	39
Irish Albums (IRMA)	78
Irish Independent Albums (IRMA)	11
Italian Albums (FIMI)	10
Polish Albums (ZPAV)	39
Russian Albums (2M)	16
Scottish Albums (Official Charts)	17
Swiss Albums (Schweizer Hitparade)	28
UK Albums (Official Charts)	11
UK Independent Albums (Official Charts)	4
US Billboard 200	29
US Independent Albums (Billboard)	6
US Top Alternative Albums (Billboard)	7
US Top Rock Albums (Billboard)	6
