= The Chauffeur =

1982 song by Duran Duran

- "Rio" UK picture sleeve (reverse)

Song by Duran Duran

from the album Rio
- Released: 10 May 1982
- Recorded: 1982
- Studio: AIR (London)
- Genre: Art pop; synth-pop; art rock; dub
- Length: 5:10 (album version); 3:48 (Blue Silver version)
- Label: EMI
- Songwriters: Nick Rhodes; Simon Le Bon; John Taylor; Roger Taylor; Andy Taylor
- Producer: Colin Thurston

Music video
- "The Chauffeur" on YouTube

Audio video
- "The Chauffeur (Blue Silver)" on YouTube

"The Chauffeur" is a song by the English pop rock band Duran Duran, released on 10 May 1982 as the final track on their second studio album, Rio. Written and performed by the lead vocalist Simon Le Bon and the keyboardist Nick Rhodes, the song originated from a poem Le Bon had written prior to joining the band and was developed into an electronic arrangement during recording sessions at AIR Studios in London.

"The Chauffeur" is noted for its ghostly and unconventional arrangement, blending art pop, synth-pop, art rock, and dub with orchestral elements. It features a sparse electronic soundscape with found sounds and an ocarina solo, and is structured around synthesisers and drum machines without contributions from other band members. Critics have described it as a stylistic outlier within Rio, contrasting its subdued and haunting tone with the album's more energetic tracks. The lyrics are abstract and impressionistic, with interpretations ranging from a stream-of-consciousness portrayal of imagery to a narrative about obsession.

Upon its release, "The Chauffeur" received a negative response. However, retrospective assessments have been more favourable, with critics praising the song and some considering it one of Duran Duran's best. Despite not being released as a single, it has gained popularity over time and developed a cult following among fans. A music video directed by Ian Emes was produced for the song, noted for its stylised imagery and limited broadcast due to its content.

== Background and recording ==
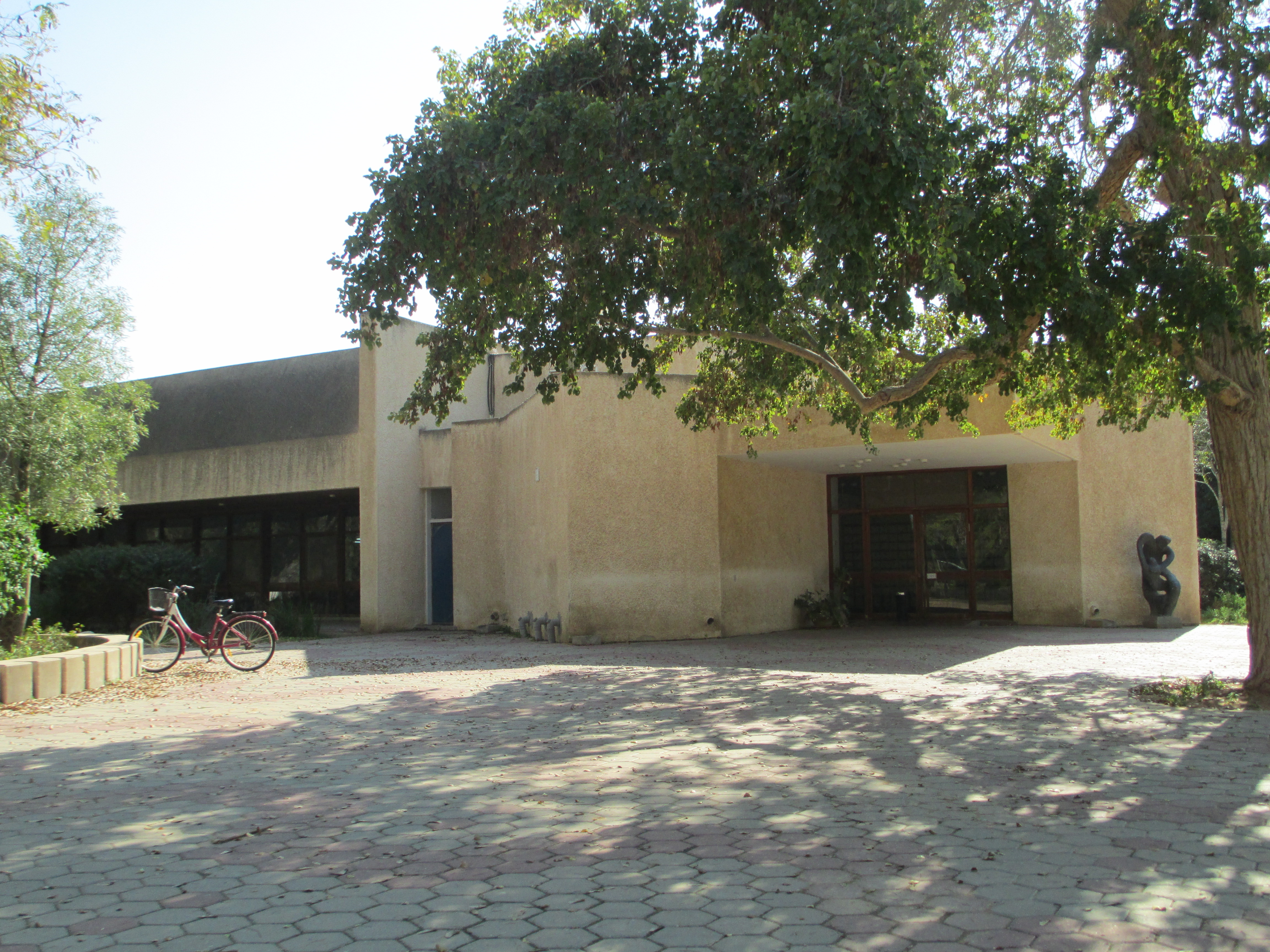
Gvulot, a kibbutz in southern Israel, where the vocalist Simon Le Bon wrote the lyrics to "The Chauffeur" in 1979.

Before attending the University of Birmingham, the vocalist Simon Le Bon spent part of his gap year in 1979 volunteering at Gvulot, a kibbutz in southern Israel. During his time there, he wrote the lyrics to "The Chauffeur" in a personal notebook he had begun compiling in 1977, which he used to write lyrics and poems while performing with earlier bands such as Dog Days and Rov Ostrov. Le Bon later presented the notebook to Duran Duran at his audition, and according to the band, his original vision for "The Chauffeur" was more acoustic. He recalled that, prior to joining the group, he would sing and play songs like "The Chauffeur" on guitar.

An early version of "The Chauffeur" was recorded with the sound engineer Renate Blauel before Duran Duran moved to AIR Studios to continue work on their second studio album, Rio (1982). According to the bassist John Taylor, it was the only song on the album not fully arranged before recording began, instead developing in the studio from an acoustic guitar sketch by Le Bon. Drawn to the vivid imagery of the song's lyrics, the keyboardist Nick Rhodes described them as "strangely exotic" and "really visual", and envisioned writing a piece that was "almost completely electronic". Despite acknowledging that such an approach was "politically a little difficult" within the band at the time, he proceeded to do so. Reflecting on this, Rhodes described the track as "an important stepping block in our sound" during the making of Rio, noting that it was "the first really completely electronic thing that we'd done".

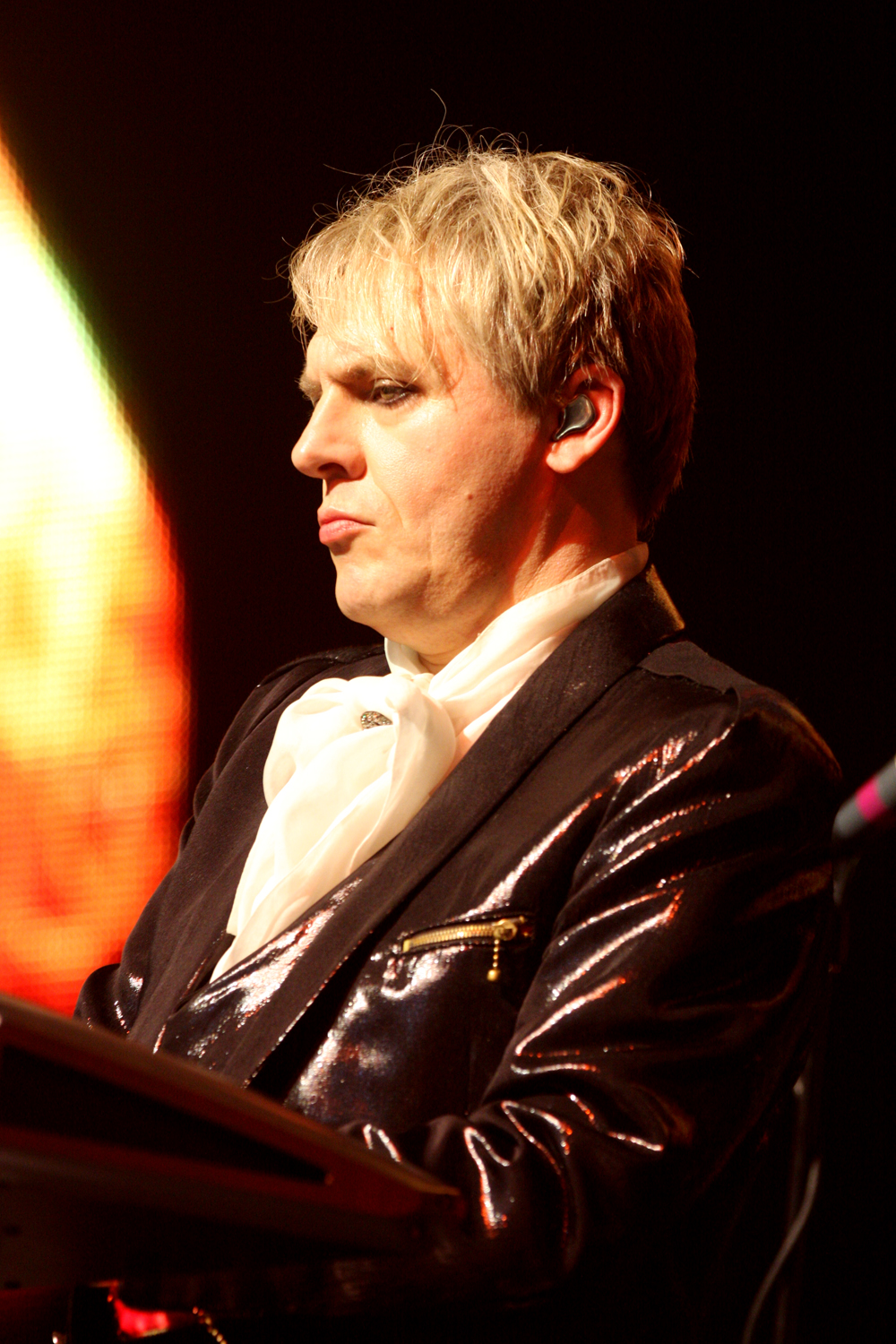
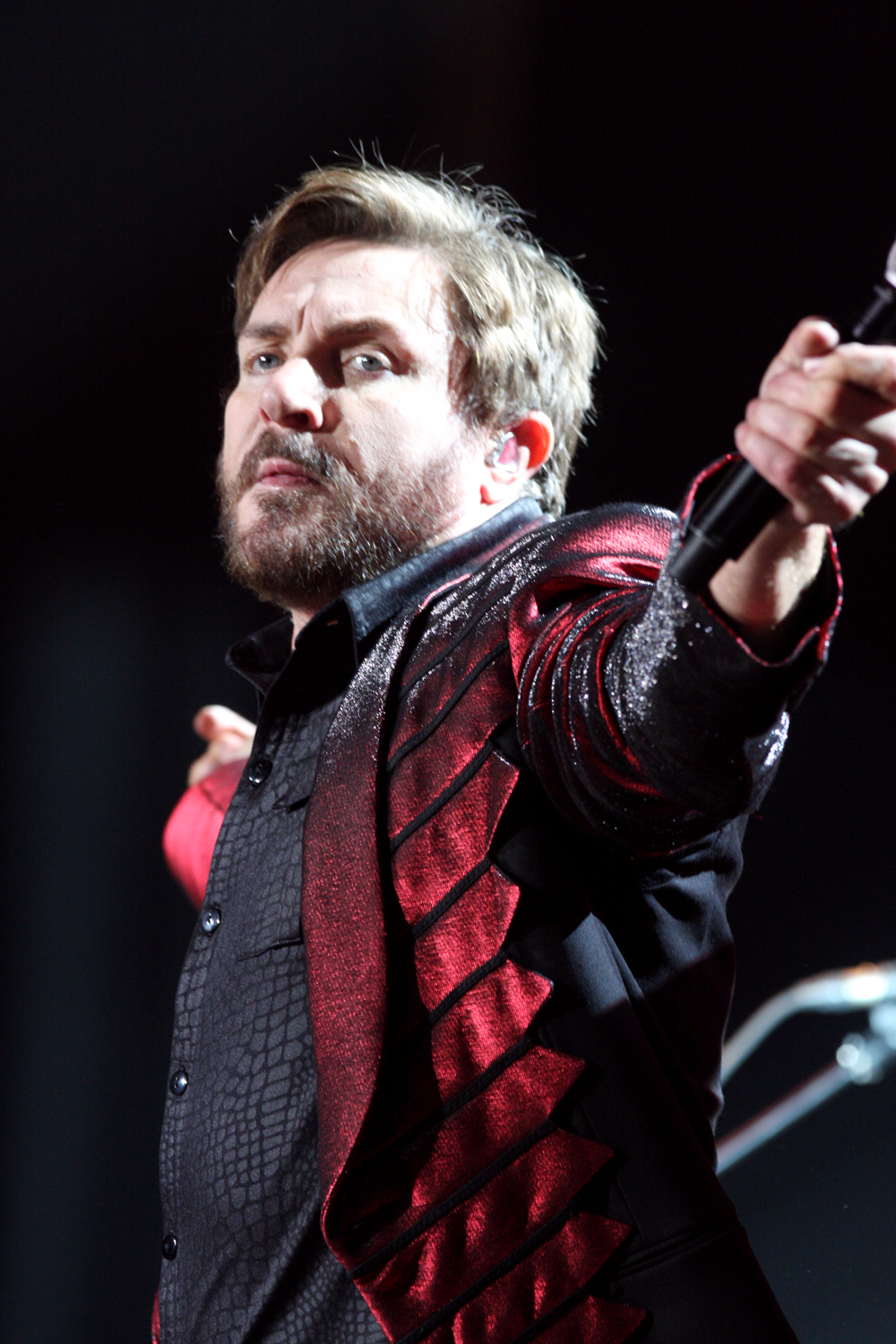
"The Chauffeur" was a collaboration between the keyboardist Nick Rhodes (left, in 2012) and Le Bon (right, in 2014).

During periods when Rhodes was not required in the main sessions, Rhodes worked in an auxiliary studio room with Blauel, their tape operator, spending hours shaping the track by programming a sequencer, layering synthesisers, creating beats on a Roland TR-808 drum machine, and incorporating homemade sound effects. Among these were recorded sounds such as an ice cube cracking, captured by close-miking a glass, alongside cricket noises and narration about nature sourced from a vinyl record. Le Bon described the song as having "loads of funny noises" and recalled that the band discovered the record in a library of insect sounds; it included narration, with lines such as "Who's that calling in the long grass near the tent?" prompting them to incorporate it into the track. Although the resulting arrangement marked a significant departure from the original acoustic version, Le Bon embraced the direction and later joined Rhodes, contributing vocals and further developing the arrangement. The pair performed a piano part together, each playing with one hand, while Le Bon also added a mournful ocarina melody sourced from the producer Colin Thurston's percussion collection. (Note: Reesman wrote that Rhodes played a "synth ocarina", while Ewing described a "synth-flute" in the song. In his review, Dahlen mentioned a pan flute, interpreting its supposed presence as suggesting "satyrs and mythical decadence".) According to Rhodes, the finished recording required no additional live instrumentation, as "it sounded right", and was ultimately accepted by the band as "a really cool, unusual piece".

An acoustic recording was later made without Rhodes, titled "The Chauffeur (Blue Silver)". Reflecting on this, Rhodes quipped, "I guess that was my punishment for having created an entirely electronic track." It is considered closer to the song's original sketch but still more harmonically developed.

== Composition ==
"The Chauffeur"
Nick Rhodes described "The Chauffeur" as "an important stepping block", noting that it was "the first completely electronic thing we'd done".

Musically, "The Chauffeur" has been described as art pop, synth-pop, art rock, and dub, reflecting a darker and more experimental approach. Donald A. Guarisco of AllMusic described the song as having a "ghostly melody", which avoids conventional pop song structure in favour of staccato phrases that "meander high and low in a dreamy fashion". He adds that this quality is further emphasized in the recording, in which Le Bon croons the lyrics in a lascivious manner over a purely electronic soundscape of icy synthesisers and throbbing drum machines. Though the song has been described as ghostly, gothic, sinister, and eerie, The A.V. Club's Stephen Thomas Erlewine observed that Rhodes' arrangement "doesn't dwell in darkness". It also retains a melodic sensibility; Alexis Petridis of The Guardian noted that, "this being Duran Duran, it still packs a big pop melody". John Freeman in The Quietus described it as "a sublime mix of plucked melodies set to an almost orchestral arrangement". Both Chris Dahlen, writing in The Pitchfork 500, and Petridis have pointed to the band Japan as a key inspiration for the song; Dahlen called it "a lesson well learned from their heroes and fellow New Romantics Japan", while Petridis wrote that their spirit "hangs over its brooding mood". Tom Ewing of Freaky Trigger positioned the song as "the exact halfway point between [Scott] Walker's cold torture-tronica and the embarrassed, serious, Europhilia of, oh, Ultravox".

"The Chauffeur" opens with faint, high-pitched keyboard notes accented by a slight echo. Erlewine characterises the song as emerging "like twinkling city lights across a desert horizon". Jim Beviglia of American Songwriter described the keyboards as "eerily chirpy, to the point where this song feels like some sort of hybrid between classic '70s Bowie and '90s Radiohead". Around the 15-second mark, this is followed by what Ewing calls "the skronky sound of a guitar pretending to crack". The bass, described by Ewing as "rearing, buzzing, and purring", momentarily glitches between 1:00 and 1:08 before giving way to Le Bon's ocarina solo at 2:15, at which point the song shifts into a march-like section. Ewing compares this section to Jona Lewie's "Stop The Cavalry", but with "Lewie's smackable downtrodden mateyness switched in favour of the art-rock aloof". Following the solo, the bass drops out and the beats drop in, their "skinny digital tick-tock start-stop" layered with found sounds such as casino chips dropping and looped, warped speech. Towards the end, the track also features cricket sounds. The ocarina solo returns for the final two minutes of the song, while Erlewine noted that the final passages feature "agile interlocking keyboard lines that almost seem playful in their spookiness". The song concludes with a brief fade and the sound of rustling keys, which Rhodes said represents a chauffeur's keys.

"The Chauffeur" has been highlighted as a stylistic outlier on Rio. (Note: Attributed to multiple references:) Mark Lindores of Classic Pop identified the song as the album's most experimental moment, describing it as a "sinister synth-infused comedown" following the rest of Rio's high-energy tracks. Erlewine called it both the culmination of Rio and an anomaly on the album, comparing it to "Night Boat" and "Save a Prayer" in its prominence of atmospheric synths. Petridis contrasted the track's mood with the rest of the album, writing that while "The rest of the Rio album is in glorious Technicolor, 'The Chauffeur' feels as if it's shot in noir-ish monochrome." Dahlen similarly highlighted the song's stark contrast to the rest of Rio, describing it as minimal enough to sound avant-garde within the context of the album's otherwise hit-driven material. The biographer Steve Malins likewise identified "The Chauffeur" as a stand-out moment on Rio, citing its "unlikely combination of electronics and ocarina".

The lyrics of "The Chauffeur" do not form a clear, literal narrative, instead leaving the story undefined and open to interpretation. Guarisco wrote that the lyrics unfold in a "stream-of-consciousness haze", presenting images of "restless driving and sexy women" that evoke a mood fitting the song's ghostly melody. Erlewine said that the images Le Bon reflects on "flit by in the shadows". Rik Flynn of Classic Pop characterised the song as a poem about a driver's obsession with his passenger. Bryan Reesman of American Songwriter wrote that "The Chauffeur" could be understood either as portraying an alienated couple on an aimless drive or a chauffeur pining for an imagined lover he cannot have. Commenting on one of the song's lines, Ewing highlighted the phrase "Out on the tar planes, the glides are moving," suggesting that "tar planes" refers to roads and "glides" to cars.

== Release ==
EMI Records released Rio on 10 May 1982, with "The Chauffeur" as the final track. "The Chauffeur (Blue Silver)" was used as a B-side for the "Rio" UK single, which was released on 1 November 1982.

== Music video ==
=== Production and release ===
The music video for "The Chauffeur" was directed by Ian Emes. Russell Mulcahy approached him to create an erotic film for Duran Duran's 1983 video album, despite Emes writing that he had "never made anything erotic before in my life". As the band and Mulcahy were working on other things, Emes was given "total free rein" to develop the concept and script, subject to approval before filming. Emes' concept centered on two lingerie-clad women, whom he described as "clone woman one and clone woman two—they're obviously some kind of robots", communicating telepathically across London as they arranged a rendezvous. Meanwhile, a chauffeur is "kind of watching and taking all of this in". Emes suspected his take on the "erotic" directive differed slightly from Mulcahy's. While Emes saw it as "more based in film noir," he thought Mulcahy's vision was "a bit more Australian. It was a bit more like girls in bras and knickers—mud wrestling." Nevertheless, Emes' script was approved.

The casting process was, according to Emes, "very improvised". The video was shot over four days in London around Westway near Shepherd's Bush and other locations, including a hotel, and a multistorey car park. Cinematography was handled by Gilbert Taylor, who filmed the video on 35 mm black-and-white film using Ilford film stock. Emes was pleased by how the combination of the music and visuals turned out, describing the finished piece as "very fluid, very flowing and very spatial".

The video was originally intended to be fully animated. Emes envisioned doing something "Tron-like", in which a "tinted color, black-and-white animated" effect would be applied to the live-action footage. After a group that included Mulcahy and Rhodes viewed Emes' edited film, Emes recalled Mulcahy telling him, "Don't touch it. It's beautiful. We don't want to animate it. Deliver it like that." Rhodes also praised Emes, later saying that he "did a spectacular job". Although Emes considered the resulting film an "oddball" that differed from the rest of the video album, it was included on the band's 1983 video album. Guarisco commented that the video "featured enough steamy content to ensure it couldn't be shown on MTV".

=== Analysis ===
The video follows a chauffeur driving an "aristocratic" woman by limousine to meet another woman. Zaleski noted that the "languid pacing and mirrored moves", including both women caressing one of their thighs "seductively" while in separate locations, "only heightens the anticipation of the encounter". They eventually meet in a multistorey car park at night, where they "dance" together as the chauffeur watches them from a distance. At the end of the sequence, the chauffeur removes his hat and becomes a woman, portrayed by Perri Lister. Emes recalled asking Lister to devise her own dance and said she came up with a "fantastic routine". Zaleski interpreted the ending as a point at which the "simmering lust and tension between the women spill over into a celebration of physical freedom and malleable gender expression".

According to Zaleski, the video explores themes such as "seductive tension, gender fluidity, romantic passion, and erotic intrigue". Emes said "It's really about love, and it's about sensuality."

Many found that the video was influenced by Helmut Newton. Emes described the video as "very Germanic". Zaleski additionally connected the video to Emes' interest in Jean-Luc Godard's 1965 film Alphaville, while Guarisco identified the 1974 film The Night Porter as another inspiration.

== Reception and legacy ==
Upon Rio's release, "The Chauffeur" received a negative comment from Record Mirror, which described the song as "a ghastly, boring embarrassment" and the worst track on the album.

"The Chauffeur" gained popularity despite never being released as a single, and developed a cult status among Duran Duran's fans. Reflecting on this, Rhodes said he was unsure how the song acquired this status and suggested that its accompanying video may have contributed. Despite it being restricted, he noted that younger listeners continued to approach him expressing admiration for both the video and the song. Dahlen described it as "almost a secret message for fans—among whom it's still a favorite—revealing a sinister edge to the band that gave us 'The Reflex'". Commenting on the song's reputation among fans, Stereogum noted that its absence from the site's list of Duran Duran's best songs led commenters and acquaintances of staff members to repeatedly question how it could have been omitted. In his correction of their list, Rhodes placed "The Chauffeur" at first and said "I'm very proud of it. It's sort of darkly beautiful, which are often my favorite songs."

"The Chauffeur" has become widely regarded as one of Duran Duran's best songs. (Note: Attributed to multiple references:) Freeman called it their finest while Petridis said "its moodiness marks it out as their best deep cut". With Beviglia calling it the second-best song on Rio, Annie Zaleski of Ultimate Classic Rock wrote that songs such as "The Chauffeur" on the album "remain strikingly original". Ewing contended that only ABBA "were making more ominous chart music", saying of Duran Duran's track: "This is experimental exploitative peacock music, absurd but lovely. Right now, with authenticity and camp, art and pop so rigorously patrolled, it's kept that rarest of qualities – the element of surprise."

"The Chauffeur" has drawn admiration from artists across a range of musical styles. The producer Mark Ronson, who produced Duran Duran's 2010 studio album All You Need Is Now, praised the song's synth work, calling it "some of the coolest, eeriest synth programming of any pop song ever", and noted the "staggering" effort required to achieve its sound in the "pre-Pro Tools era". The alternative metal band Deftones later recorded a cover of "The Chauffeur" and included it on their B-Sides & Rarities (2005) compilation album. (Note: The album also includes a cover of Duran Duran's "Night Boat" from Duran Duran (1981).) The frontman Chino Moreno has cited it as one of his favourite covers they did, stating, "I loved that song ever since I was growing up. It's cool to be able to sing the songs you grew up listening to." The band's version replaced the original's icy synth textures with a heavier, guitar-driven sound, and Moreno's vocal performance was noted by Metal Hammer's Dave Everly for closely capturing Le Bon's tone. Everly included the cover in the magazine's list of "The Top 10 Best Metal Covers of 80s Pop Songs." In a 2007 live performance in Las Vegas, the singer Jonathan Davis also covered "The Chauffeur" and introduced it by calling it "the greatest Duran Duran song ever". Davis described meeting Le Bon as a significant moment in his life, telling the story of how he immediately brought up "The Chauffeur" and later spent the night socialising with Le Bon in London. Both Moreno and Davis' covers of the song have been cited as examples of what Everley described as Duran Duran's "unlikely influence on nu metal's founding fathers".

== Personnel ==
According to Zaleski: (Note: In the Rio liner notes, the entire band is credited for writing and arranging every song.)

Duran Duran

- Simon Le Bon – vocals, ocarina
- Nick Rhodes – keyboards, synthesisers, drum machine, sound effects

Technical

- Colin Thurston – producer and engineer
