= Careless Memories =

- Cover photography by Peter Ashworth

Single by Duran Duran

from the album Duran Duran
- B-side: "Khanada"; "Fame"
- Released: 20 April 1981
- Recorded: December 1980
- Studio: Red Bus (London)
- Genre: New wave; Eurodisco
- Length: 3:41 (single version); 3:53 (album version)
- Label: EMI; Capitol
- Songwriters: Simon Le Bon; John Taylor; Roger Taylor; Andy Taylor; Nick Rhodes
- Producer: Colin Thurston

Duran Duran UK singles chronology
"Planet Earth" (1981)	"Careless Memories" (1981)	"Girls on Film" (1981)

Music video
- "Careless Memories" on YouTube

"Careless Memories" is the second single by the English pop rock band Duran Duran, released on 20 April 1981. It reached no. 37 in the UK and no. 60 in Australia.

== Content ==
"Careless Memories" has been described as "a classic hybrid of Euro-disco, new wave guitar pop and Bowie/Kraftwerk". Music journalist Annie Zaleski has noted its influence from punk rock as well as the motorik beats of Kraftwerk. Zaleski described it as a song that starts "with an insistent rhythmic oscillation that sounded like choppy helicopter blades" on which Duran Duran "piled on forceful sounds" featuring "Andy Taylor's slash-and-burn electric guitars, Nick Rhodes' atmospheric synths, quick and fiery bass from John Taylor and drums by Roger Taylor" and "a yearning, urgent vocal performance full of grit and desperation" by Simon Le Bon.

While underperforming on the UK Singles chart upon its release, spending just four weeks on the chart with a peak position at number 37, the song quickly became a favourite of both fans and the band. The song has frequently been included in Duran Duran's live set lists throughout their career.

The B-side of the single features the song "Khanada" which has been described as a "romantic song [that] radiates post-punk energy with reggae bass undercurrents" and featuring a chorus with two separate vocal lines intertwined. Simon Le Bon has revealed that the song was inspired by a new romantic clothing designer the band knew named Jane Kahn.

== Music video ==
The video was shot in Soho and directed by Perry Haines, who went on to form i-D magazine.

There are two different cuts of this video. The second version, which was included in the Duran Duran video album released in 1983, features minor re-edits of certain scenes. The original version of the video was finally released on the Duran Duran album 2010 2CD+DVD remaster.

== B-sides and bonus tracks ==
The song "Khanada" was included as the B-side to the single. The UK 12" release also included a cover version of David Bowie's "Fame" on the B-side.

In Japan, the two B-sides were released on the Nite Romantics EP, along with night versions (dance remixes) of "Girls on Film" and "Planet Earth".

== Critical reception ==
Upon its release in April 1981, Smash Hits' reviewer Mark Ellen wrote: "Sensibly side-stepping the over-ploughed "sensitive" disco field (Spandau etc.), the persuasive force of the ten ton drum sound is not lost on this lot. Buried beneath layers of silk finish is a construction so staggeringly basic you wonder if their punk roots don't extend back to the Dry-Ice Age."

== Formats and track listings ==
=== 7": EMI / EMI 5168 United Kingdom ===
1. "Careless Memories" – 3:41
2. "Khanada" – 3:17

=== 12": EMI / 12 EMI 5168 United Kingdom ===
1. "Careless Memories" – 3:53
2. "Fame" – 3:11
3. "Khanada" – 3:17
- Track 1 is the album version of "Careless Memories".

=== 12": Harvest / SPRO-9662, SPRO-9663 (Promo) United States ===
1. "Careless Memories" – 3:53
2. "Is There Anyone Out There" – 4.02
3. "Girls on Film" – 3.30
- Track 1 is the album version of "Careless Memories".

=== CD: Part of Singles Box Set 1981–1985 ===
1. "Careless Memories" – 3:44
2. "Khanada" – 3:17
3. "Fame" – 3:11
- Track 1 is the 7" version of "Careless Memories".

== Charts ==
Chart (1981)	Peak position
Australia (Kent Music Report)	60
UK Singles (OCC)	37

== Other appearances ==
When the song "Is There Something I Should Know?" was issued as a single in the US, "Careless Memories" was placed on the flipside. The song was also a favourite live staple throughout the 1980s and was included on the live album Arena.

A live version of "Careless Memories" recorded in December 1981 at the Hammersmith Odeon in London was released in 1982 as the B-side to "Hungry Like the Wolf".

"Careless Memories" was one of the few singles not included on either the Decade or Greatest compilation albums.

== Personnel ==
Duran Duran

- Simon Le Bon – vocals
- Nick Rhodes – keyboards
- John Taylor – bass guitar
- Roger Taylor – drums
- Andy Taylor – guitar

Producer

- Colin Thurston

Sleeve photography

- Peter Ashworth

== Musical notes ==
The song has a rock double-timed bass line in the key of E, with a keyboard intro played deliberately off-time.
