= Union of the Snake =

Single by Duran Duran

from the album Seven and the Ragged Tiger
- B-side: "Secret Oktober"
- Released: 17 October 1983
- Studio: AIR (Salem, Montserrat)
- Genre: Dance-pop
- Length: 4:20
- Label: EMI; Capitol
- Songwriters: Simon Le Bon; John Taylor; Roger Taylor; Andy Taylor; Nick Rhodes
- Producers: Alex Sadkin; Ian Little; Duran Duran

Duran Duran singles chronology
"Is There Something I Should Know?" (1983)	"Union of the Snake" (1983)	"New Moon on Monday" (1984)

Music video
- "Union of the Snake" on YouTube

"Union of the Snake" is the ninth single by the English pop rock band Duran Duran, released on 17 October 1983.

It was the lead single from the band's third album Seven and the Ragged Tiger (1983), and preceded its release by one month. It became one of Duran Duran's most popular singles, hitting number one on the US Cashbox and peaking at number three on the US Billboard Hot 100 for three consecutive weeks at the end of 1983. Further chart movement was prevented by "Say It Isn't So" by Daryl Hall and John Oates and "Say Say Say" by Paul McCartney and Michael Jackson. It also reached number three on the UK singles chart.

== Reception ==
Cashbox said the song "stealthily stalks along on Simon Le Bon's clenched vocals, but more cautiously [than 'Hungry Like the Wolf'] in the night-time nightmare world depicted in these lyrics."

== B-sides, bonus tracks and remixes ==
The B-side to "Union of the Snake" was the atmospheric piece "Secret Oktober", a collaboration between keyboardist Nick Rhodes and Le Bon. Forty-eight hours before "Union of the Snake" was due to be pressed in the US, the band were informed that they didn't have a B-side for the single, neither did the band have any material that was appropriate for the B-side. So Rhodes, Le Bon and producer Sadkin set out to work on "Secret Oktober" at 301 Studios in Sydney, Australia (where the Seven and the Ragged Tiger album was being completed); it had been written, recorded and mixed within the 24-hour period they had to meet the deadline.

Also included on the 12" single was an extended remix of the single, titled the "Monkey" mix.

== Formats and track listings ==
=== 7" single: EMI / EMI 5429 United Kingdom ===
1. "Union of the Snake" – 4:24
2. "Secret Oktober" – 2:48

=== 12" single: EMI / 12 EMI 5429 United Kingdom ===
1. "Union of the Snake" (Monkey mix) – 6:27
2. "Union of the Snake" – 4:24
3. "Secret Oktober" – 2:48

=== 7" single: Capitol / B-5290 United States ===
1. "Union of the Snake" – 4:20
2. "Secret Oktober" – 2:44

=== 12" single: Capitol / 8567 United States ===
1. "Union of the Snake" (Monkey mix) – 6:22
2. "Union of the Snake" – 4:20
3. "Secret Oktober" – 2:44

Note:

- The "Monkey" mix is also known as the "Extended" mix or the "Super" mix.

== Charts ==
=== Weekly charts ===
Weekly chart performance for "Union of the Snake"
Chart (1983–1984)	Peak position
Australia (Kent Music Report)	4
Canada Top Singles (RPM)	2
France (SNEP)	8
Ireland (IRMA)	5
Israel (IBA)	1
Italy (Musica e dischi)	16
New Zealand (Recorded Music NZ)	3
Norway (VG-lista)	8
South Africa (Springbok)	21
Spain (AFYVE)	16
Spain Airplay (Top 40 Radio)	1
Sweden (Sverigetopplistan)	16
UK Singles (Official Charts)	3
US Billboard Hot 100	3
US Cashbox	1
Zimbabwe (ZIMA)	2

=== Year-end charts ===
Year-end chart performance for "Union of the Snake"
Chart (1983)	Position
Australia (Kent Music Report)	66
New Zealand (Recorded Music NZ)	42
UK Singles (OCC)	91
US Cash Box	20

Chart (1984)	Position
Canada Top Singles (RPM)	56
US Billboard	43

== Certifications and sales ==
Region	Certification	Certified units/sales
Canada (Music Canada)	Gold	50,000^{^}
United Kingdom (BPI)	Silver	250,000^{^}
^{^} Shipments figures based on certification alone.

== Cover versions ==
In 2018, the song was covered by Camila Mendes, Asha Bromfield and Hayley Law in the episode "Chapter Twenty-Four: The Wrestler" from the second season of the television series Riverdale.

== Personnel ==
Duran Duran

- Simon Le Bon – vocals
- Andy Taylor – guitar, backing vocals
- John Taylor – bass guitar, backing vocals
- Roger Taylor – drums
- Nick Rhodes – keyboards

Additional musicians

- Andy Hamilton – soprano and tenor saxophone
- Raphael Dejesus – percussion
- Mark Kennedy – percussion
- Michelle Cobbs – backing vocals
- B.J. Nelson – backing vocals

Technical

- Alex Sadkin – producer
- Ian Little – producer
