= Is There Something I Should Know? =

Single by Duran Duran
- B-side: "Faith in This Colour"; "Careless Memories"
- Released: 14 March 1983 (UK); May 1983 (US)
- Recorded: December 1982
- Studio: Good Earth (London)
- Genre: New pop
- Length: 4:11 (single version); 4:26 (music video version); 6:43 (Monster mix)
- Label: EMI; Capitol
- Songwriters: Simon Le Bon; John Taylor; Roger Taylor; Andy Taylor; Nick Rhodes
- Producers: Duran Duran; Ian Little

Duran Duran singles chronology
"Rio" (1982)	"Is There Something I Should Know?" (1983)	"Union of the Snake" (1983)

Alternative cover
- 12" Monster mix sleeve

Music video
- "Is There Something I Should Know?" on YouTube

"Is There Something I Should Know?" is the eighth single by the English pop rock band Duran Duran, released on 14 March 1983.

The song was released as a stand-alone single and became the band's first UK number one record. It debuted in the number one position on the UK Singles Chart on 26 March 1983. The single also had great success in America, where it was released in late May. The song reached number four on the US Billboard Hot 100 on 6 August 1983 and sold more than a million copies. As of October 2021, "Is There Something I Should Know?" is the eleventh most streamed Duran Duran song in the UK.

== Recording ==
"Is There Something I Should Know?" was recorded at Tony Visconti's Good Earth Studios in Soho, London with producer Ian Little, who was recommended to Duran Duran by Roxy Music's Phil Manzanera. Eventually, the song would undergo several rounds of mixing due to a lack of compression on the drums as Little asserted: one mix was done at Good Earth, one at Eel Pie Studios, one at the Gallery and one at the Power Station in New York with Bob Clearmountain. Keyboardist Nick Rhodes remembered being present most of the night during the mix with Clearmountain and leaving the next day thinking the band had something special on their hands. But upon reflection some days later, it was decided that despite being what they considered a "beautiful mix", it was a little too soft for the sound they were trying to achieve for the record. So the final mix would be done with producer Alex Sadkin (who'd be brought in to produce the band's next album alongside Little, Seven and the Ragged Tiger) and Phil Thornalley at RAK Studios, London, who replaced the drums with samples triggered via AMS delay units. According to Rhodes, the pulsing keyboard sound is from a Roland Jupiter-8 synth, while the Prophet-5 was used for a small melodic part.

== Critical reception ==
In its contemporary review of the song, Cash Box praised "the upbeat arrangement, clear production and lustrous vocals." David Hepworth of Smash Hits just noticed that producer change lead to "more pronounced rock group sound" and expressed displeasure with impossibility to do something "with an overly-strained chorus." In a retrospective review of the song, AllMusic journalist Donald A. Guarisco wrote that the lyrics "deal with a difficult romantic relationship in rather obtuse terms." Guarisco highlighted what he described as "odd turns of phrase" in the lyrics, such as: "and fiery demons all dance when you walk through that door/Don't say you're easy on me 'cause you're about as easy as a nuclear war."

Although Guarisco questioned the lyrics, he praised the melody in the song. He wrote: "The melody of 'Is There Something I Should Know?' is one of Duran Duran's catchiest, matching twisty verse melodies full of ear-catching hooks with a harmonized chorus."

== Music video ==
The video for "Is There Something I Should Know?" featured colour clips of the band members, in blue shirts with tucked-in white ties, interspersed with surreal images in black-and-white. The video made a point of marking the transition between the first three albums, featuring clips from several earlier Duran Duran videos. This included "My Own Way"—presented on the Duran Duran video album but never released to MTV.

The video was directed by Russell Mulcahy, and was one of the most popular videos of 1983 on MTV. The video is longer as there are verses that were edited out of the original 45 release, that subsequently made it to album, tape and CD. The DVD Greatest Hits has the long version video.

When asked if there was anything about their videos they would like to change, drummer Roger Taylor commented, "The only part of a video I would change is the end of 'Is There Something I Should Know?' where I am singing to the camera. I look very uncomfortable doing this and cringe every time I see it to this day."

== B-sides, bonus tracks and remixes ==
The B-side to "Is There Something I Should Know?" in the UK is the instrumental "Faith in This Colour". An "alternate slow mix" of "Faith in This Colour" was used on the 7" single, some pressings of which included brief unauthorized sound samples from the movie Star Wars—these were promptly withdrawn when copyright concerns were raised, although on the "alternate slow mix" from the singles box set, the scene, in which Obi-Wan Kenobi (Alec Guinness) leaves to disable the Death Star tractor beam, can clearly be heard in the last minute.

The mainly instrumental "Monster mix" of "Is There Something I Should Know?" was completed by producers Ian Little and Alex Sadkin and Phil Thornalley at RAK studio One.

In the US, the song "Careless Memories" was used as the B-side.

== Formats and track listings ==
=== 7": EMI / EMI 5371 United Kingdom ===
1. "Is There Something I Should Know?" – 4:11
2. "Faith in This Colour" (alternate slow mix) – 4:06

=== 12": EMI / 12 EMI 5371 United Kingdom ===
1. "Is There Something I Should Know?" (Monster mix) – 6:43
2. "Faith in This Colour" – 4:06

=== 7": Capitol / B-5233 United States ===
1. "Is There Something I Should Know?" – 4:07
2. "Careless Memories" – 3:53
- Track 2 is the album version.

=== 12": Capitol / 8551 United States ===
1. "Is There Something I Should Know?" (Monster mix) – 6:40
2. "Faith in This Colour" – 4:05

=== 12": EMI / EMI Electrola 1C K062-65-106Z Germany ===
1. "Is There Something I Should Know?" (Monster mix) – 6:43
2. "Is There Something I Should Know?" (short mix) – 4:06
3. "Faith in This Colour" – 4:04
- Track 2 "short mix" is the single version.

=== CD: Part of Singles Box Set 1981–1985 ===
1. "Is There Something I Should Know?" – 4:11
2. "Faith in This Colour" – 4:05
3. "Is There Something I Should Know?" (Monster mix) – 6:40
4. "Faith in This Colour" (alternate slow mix) – 4:05
- "Monster mix" remixed by Alex Sadkin, Ian Little and Phil Thornalley.

== Charts ==
=== Weekly charts ===
Weekly chart performance for "Is There Something I Should Know?"
Chart (1983)	Peak position
Australia (Kent Music Report)	4
Belgium (Ultratop 50 Flanders)	16
Canada (The Record)	12
Canada Top Singles (RPM)	3
Finland (Suomen virallinen lista)	2
Ireland (IRMA)	2
Israel (Israeli Singles Chart)	8
Italy (Musica e dischi)	20
Netherlands (Dutch Top 40)	14
Netherlands (Single Top 100)	24
New Zealand (Recorded Music NZ)	5
Norway (VG-lista)	10
South Africa (Springbok Radio)	23
Sweden (Sverigetopplistan)	16
Switzerland (Schweizer Hitparade)	7
UK Singles (Official Charts)	1
US Billboard Hot 100	4
US Dance Club Songs (Billboard)	34
US Mainstream Rock (Billboard)	3
US Cash Box Top 100	7
West Germany (GfK)	28

=== Year-end charts ===
Year-end chart performance for "Is There Something I Should Know?"
Chart (1983)	Position
Australia (Kent Music Report)	54
Canada Top Singles (RPM)	40
New Zealand (Recorded Music NZ)	30
UK Singles (OCC)	17
US Billboard Hot 100	55
US Cash Box Top 100	48

== Personnel ==
Duran Duran

- Simon Le Bon – vocals, harmonica
- Nick Rhodes – keyboards
- John Taylor – bass guitar and background vocals
- Roger Taylor – drums
- Andy Taylor – guitar, vocals

Technical

- Ian Little – producer
- Alex Sadkin – mixer
- Phil Thornalley – mix engineer
- Mike Nocito – mix assistant engineer

== Allstars version ==
In 2001, English pop group Allstars released their version as a double A-side single with their own track "Things That Go Bump in the Night". Both songs are from their 2002 sole self-titled album. The single reached No. 12 on the UK Singles Chart in September 2001.

=== Track listings ===
CD single

1. "Things That Go Bump in the Night"
2. "Is There Something I Should Know?"
3. "Is There Something I Should Know?" (Almighty mix)
4. "Things That Go Bump in the Night" (video)

Cassette

1. "Things That Go Bump in the Night"
2. "Is There Something I Should Know?"
3. "That Crazy Thing That We Call Love"

12" vinyl

1. "Is There Something I Should Know?" (Mothership mix)
2. "Is There Something I Should Know?" (Almighty mix)
3. "Is There Something I Should Know?" (K Boys club mix)
4. "Is There Something I Should Know?" (radio edit)
5. "Things That Go Bump in the Night" (Xenomania mix)
6. "Things That Go Bump in the Night" (radio edit)

Promo CD

1. "Things That Go Bump in the Night" (radio edit)
2. "Is There Something I Should Know?" (radio edit)

== Other versions ==
Other cover versions of the song have been recorded by the Mr. T Experience for The Duran Duran Tribute Album (1997), and by Harvey Danger.

== Samples and media references ==
The band Sugar Ray took elements from the video and featured them in a segment of the music video for their single "When It's Over".

The 2016 second episode of the sixth season of the cartoon series The Venture Bros., entitled "Maybe No Go", follows Billy Quizboy (voiced by Doc Hammer) and Pete White (voiced by Christopher McCulloch) retrieving the rubber ball prop used in the music video from their archenemy Augustus St. Cloud (also voiced by McCulloch), a collector of pop culture memorabillia.

The line "you're about as easy as a nuclear war" was the inspiration for the Duran Duran song "Yo Bad Azizi", included as a B-side to the "Serious" single released seven years later in 1990 and included as a bonus track on their album Liberty.
