= Goodbye Is Forever =

- French 12" sleeve

Single by Arcadia

from the album So Red the Rose
- B-side: "Missing"
- Released: January 1986
- Recorded: Studio de la Grande Armée (Paris)
- Genre: Art rock; pop; synth-pop
- Length: 4:11 (single version); 6:43 (extended remix); 5:14 (dub)
- Label: Capitol
- Songwriters: Roger Taylor; Nick Rhodes; Simon Le Bon
- Producer: Alex Sadkin

Arcadia singles chronology
"Election Day" (1985)	"Goodbye Is Forever" (1986)	"The Promise" (1986)

Music video
- "Goodbye Is Forever" on YouTube

"Goodbye Is Forever" is the second single released by the Duran Duran offshoot band Arcadia. The song achieved success only in the United States, peaking at number 33 on the Billboard Hot 100 chart in March, 1986. It also was released by Capitol Records in January 1986 in many regions around the world except the UK.

The B-side of "Goodbye Is Forever" was the mid-tempo ballad "Missing" which was released only as a promo track in the US and Canada.

== Music video ==
A video was made for both the A-side and B-side. Drummer Roger Taylor, who participated in the recording of the album and appeared in Aecadia's "Election Day" music video just a few months earlier, decided to leave the band during the release of this single and step away from music for several years. Taylor did not appear in this or subsequent music videos.

The video for "Goodbye Is Forever" was directed by Marcello Anciano and featured Simon Le Bon and Nick Rhodes as figures "stranded in time", almost like two characters out of Samuel Beckett. They actually appear to be trapped within the elaborate mechanisms of a giant cuckoo clock whilst sitting on chairs that move along a circular railroad-guard. The moving chairs transport the two pop stars through many strange scenes and surreal episodes involving symbols of time.

The video for "Missing" was directed by Dean Chamberlain and featured many luminous, dreamlike images that were achieved through innovative photographic techniques involving extended exposure times and unique lighting applications. The same video technic system was used later in the 1988 Duran Duran video for "All She Wants Is", directed again by Chamberlain.

== B-sides, bonus tracks and remixes ==
"Goodbye Is Forever" featured extended and dub mixes by François Kevorkian and Ron Saint Germain. The single mix was done by Alex Sadkin.

The B-side to the single was the album track "Missing".

== Formats and track listings ==
=== 7": Capitol / B-5542 (United States) ===
1. "Goodbye Is Forever" (single mix) – 4:11
2. "Missing" – 3:41

=== 12": Capitol / S-75134 (Canada) ===
1. "Goodbye Is Forever" (extended remix) – 6:43
2. "Missing" – 3:41
3. "Goodbye Is Forever" (single mix) – 4:11

=== 12": Capitol / V-15218 (United States) ===
1. "Goodbye Is Forever" (extended remix) – 6:43
2. "Goodbye Is Forever" (single mix) – 4:11
3. "Goodbye Is Forever" (dub) – 5:14
4. "Missing" – 3:41

== Personnel ==
Arcadia

- Simon Le Bon – vocals, rhythm guitar
- Nick Rhodes – keyboards
- Roger Taylor – drums

Technical

- Alex Sadkin – producer and engineer
