= Election Day (song) =

- 7" single sleeve

Single by Arcadia

from the album So Red the Rose
- B-side: "She's Moody and Grey, She's Mean and She's Restless"
- Released: 14 October 1985
- Studio: Studio de la Grande Armée (Paris)
- Genre: New wave; synth-pop
- Length: 4:30 (single version); 8:39 (Consensus mix); 8:27 (Cryptic cut no voice mix); 9:06 (Cryptic cut/Fact and Story mix)
- Label: Parlophone
- Songwriters: Nick Rhodes; Simon Le Bon
- Producer: Alex Sadkin

Arcadia singles chronology
"Election Day" (1985)	"Goodbye Is Forever" (1986)

Music video
- "Election Day" on YouTube

"Election Day" is the first single released by the Duran Duran offshoot band Arcadia.

It was released by Parlophone in October 1985 and subsequently hit the Top 10 on both sides of the Atlantic, peaking at No. 6 in the US and No. 7 in the UK. In Italy, spurred on by several high profile TV appearances, it became a huge hit, spending seven consecutive weeks at No. 1 between November 1985 and January 1986. It also reached the Top 5 in New Zealand and Ireland. Along with the Arcadia members, "Election Day" features Grace Jones on vocals and speech segments.

== Lyrical content ==
When Smash Hits published the lyrics in their magazine, they published the complete lyric, which included a verse that was subsequently dropped from the released version of the song:

Don't even try to induce, In all my restrain there's no hesitation
All the signs on the loose 'cause sanity's rare this end of the hard day
Shadows are crawling out of the subway
Any way that you choose in every direction just to confuse me

This additional verse was also included in the lyrics which were printed on the back of the sleeve of the "Cryptic cut no voice" release.

== Music video ==
The dark and moody video—with Gothic imagery inspired by Jean Cocteau's 1946 film, La Belle et la Bête—was shot in and around Paris in late September 1985. It was directed by Roger Christian. There is a short cameo appearance by an actor dressed like William S. Burroughs. A documentary film was made on the filming and production of the music video.

== Official remixes ==
It was the first Duran Duran–related single to have more than one remix of the lead track, a feature that would continue on "Notorious" a year later. There were a total of seven mixes of "Election Day":

- Album version (5:29) – Original mix; all except the early rough mix are different permutations of this version
- Single version (4:30) – Edited album version
- Consensus mix (8:39) – 12" and promo video version
- "She's Moody and Grey, She's Mean and She's Restless" (4:28) – Instrumental B-side; title from first verse of the song
- Cryptic cut/Fact and Story mix (9:06) – Largely instrumental, featuring extended passages and a short 'political speech'
- Cryptic cut no voice mix (8:27) – The "Cryptic cut" mix, without the speech
- Early rough mix (9:04) – An early, mostly instrumental version

== Formats and track listings ==
=== 7": Parlophone / NSR 1 (UK) ===
1. "Election Day" (single version) – 4:30
2. "She's Moody and Grey, She's Mean and She's Restless" – 4:28
- Track 1 is also known as the "7 inch mix"
- B-side is an instrumental version of "Election Day"

=== 12": Parlophone / 12 NSR 1 (UK) ===
1. "Election Day" (Consensus mix) – 8:39
2. "Election Day" (single version) – 4:30
3. "She's Moody and Grey, She's Mean and She's Restless" – 4:28

=== 12": Parlophone / 12 NSRA 1 (UK) ===
1. "Election Day" (Cryptic cut no voice mix) – 8:27
2. "Election Day" (single version) – 4:30
3. "Election Day" (Consensus mix) – 8:39

=== 12": Townhouse / PSLP393 (UK) ===
1. "Election Day" (Cryptic cut / Fact and Story mix) – 9:06
- 1-sided UK promo, unlabelled
- This version was later referred to by Le Bon and Rhodes as the "Cryptic cut"
- The name "Fact and Story mix" comes from the spoken word part in the mix and was first referred to by this name on a bootleg remix album

== Charts ==
=== Weekly charts ===
Weekly chart performance for "Election Day"
Chart (1985–1986)	Peak position
Australia (Kent Music Report)	13
Belgium (Ultratop 50)	14
Canada Top Singles (RPM)	8
Germany (Media Control Charts)	21
Ireland (IRMA)	5
Italy (Musica e dischi)	1
Japan (Oricon)	93
Netherlands (Single Top 100)	12
New Zealand (Recorded Music NZ)	4
Norway (VG-lista)	7
Switzerland (Swiss Hitparade)	18
UK Singles Chart	7
US Cash Box Top 100	7
US Billboard Hot 100	6

=== Year-end charts ===
Year-end chart performance for "Election Day"
Chart (1986)	Position
US Billboard Hot 100	86

== Certifications ==
Region	Certification	Certified units/sales
Canada (Music Canada)	Gold	50,000^{^}
^{^} Shipments figures based on certification alone.

== Personnel ==
Arcadia

- Simon Le Bon – vocals
- Nick Rhodes – keyboards
- Roger Taylor – drums

Additional musicians

- Grace Jones – guest vocalist
- Carlos Alomar – guitars
- Masami Tsuchiya – guitars
- Mark Egan – bass guitar; double bass
- Andy Mackay – tenor saxophone

Technical

- Alex Sadkin – producer; engineer

== Covers, samples, and media references ==
On Duran Duran's 'Strange Behaviour' tour, the band performed a medley of "Election Day" and the Power Station's single, "Some Like It Hot".
