= The Reflex =

1984 single by Duran Duran

"The Reflex" (remix)
- Dance mix version artwork

Single by Duran Duran

from the album Seven and the Ragged Tiger
- B-side: "Make Me Smile (Come Up and See Me)" (live); "New Religion" (live)
- Released: 16 April 1984
- Genre: Dance-pop; synth-pop; new wave; funk
- Length: 5:29 (album version); 4:25 (single version); 6:36 (dance mix)
- Label: EMI; Capitol
- Songwriters: Simon Le Bon; John Taylor; Roger Taylor; Andy Taylor; Nick Rhodes
- Producers: Duran Duran; Alex Sadkin; Ian Little; remix by Nile Rodgers and Jason Corsaro

Duran Duran singles chronology
"New Moon on Monday" (1984)	"The Reflex" (remix) (1984)	"The Wild Boys" (1984)

Alternative cover
- US 7" sleeve

Music video
- "The Reflex" on YouTube

"The Reflex" is the eleventh single by the English pop rock band Duran Duran, released on 16 April 1984. The song was heavily remixed by Nile Rodgers and Jason Corsaro for the single release. It was the third and last to be taken from their third studio album Seven and the Ragged Tiger (1983). The single became the band's first to reach the top of the Billboard Hot 100 and their second to top the UK Singles Chart. On Billboard's chart, it also became the first of two songs blocking Bruce Springsteen's "Dancing in the Dark" from reaching number one (along with Prince's "When Doves Cry").

== Critical reception ==
Cash Box wrote: "Spotlighting the slick vocals of Simon Le Bon and the tight Euro-pop rhythms set to a funk beat, 'The Reflex' will certainly cause a stir for current fans and it will probably reach a new, more dance oriented crowd."

== Music video ==
Main photography of the music video for "The Reflex" took place during the Seven and the Ragged Tiger tour at Maple Leaf Gardens in Toronto, Ontario, Canada on 5 March 1984. Director Russell Mulcahy filmed some of the close-up footage in the indoor arena that afternoon, and the band's performance was filmed live during that evening's concert.

== B-sides, bonus tracks and remixes ==
In addition to the 4:26 single remix, the 12" also includes an extended remix of "The Reflex". The live B-side "Make Me Smile (Come Up and See Me)" is a cover version of a Steve Harley & Cockney Rebel song, recorded 16 November 1982 at Hammersmith Odeon in London, England, with lead Rebel Steve Harley joining the band onstage.

A second live B-side released on the U.S. single, "New Religion", was recorded on 7 February 1984 at the Forum in Los Angeles, California. This is not the same live version that appears on the album Arena (1984).

== Formats and track listings ==
7": EMI / Duran 2 United Kingdom

1. "The Reflex" – 4:20
2. "Make Me Smile (Come Up and See Me)" (live) – 4:54 (recorded live at Hammersmith Odeon, London, 16 November 1982)

12": EMI / 12 Duran 2 United Kingdom

1. "The Reflex" (dance mix) – 6:35
2. "The Reflex" [7" version] – 4:20
3. "Make Me Smile (Come Up and See Me)" (live) – 4:54 (recorded live at Hammersmith Odeon, London, 16 November 1982)

7": Capitol / B-5345 United States

1. "The Reflex" (the dance mix—edited) – 4:25
2. "New Religion" (live in L.A.) – 4:52 (recorded live at the Forum, Los Angeles, 7 February 1984)
- The "dance mix—edited" version is the same version as the regular 7".

12": Capitol / V-8587 United States

1. "The Reflex" (dance mix) – 6:35
2. "The Reflex" (the dance mix—edited) – 4:25

CD: Part of Singles Box Set 1981–1985

1. "The Reflex" – 4:20
2. "Make Me Smile (Come Up and See Me)" (live) – 4:54 (recorded live at Hammersmith Odeon, London, 16 November 1982)
3. "The Reflex" (dance mix) – 6:35

== Charts ==
=== Weekly charts ===
Weekly chart performance for "The Reflex"
Chart (1984)	Peak position
Australia (Kent Music Report)	4
Austria (Ö3 Austria Top 40)	11
Belgium (Ultratop 50 Flanders)	1
Canada Top Singles (RPM)	3
Canada Top Singles (The Record)	4
Europe (Eurochart Hot 100)	1
France (IFOP)	6
France (SNEP)	15
France (Music & Media)	3
Ireland (IRMA)	1
Israel (IBA)	1
Italy (Musica e dischi)	6
Netherlands (Dutch Top 40)	1
Netherlands (Single Top 100)	1
New Zealand (Recorded Music NZ)	6
Peru (UPI)	6
Spain (AFYVE)	14
Spain Airplay (Top 40 Radio)	37
Switzerland (Schweizer Hitparade)	10
UK Singles (Official Charts)	1
US Billboard Hot 100	1
US Cash Box Top 100	1
West Germany (GfK)	8

=== Year-end charts ===
Year-end chart performance for "The Reflex"
Chart (1984)	Position
Australia (Kent Music Report)	34
Belgium (Ultratop 50 Flanders)	3
Canada Top Singles (RPM)	23
France (IFOP)	40
Israel (IBA)	9
Netherlands (Dutch Top 40)	7
Netherlands (Single Top 100)	8
UK Singles (OCC)	17
US Billboard Hot 100	16
US Cash Box Top 100	10
West Germany (Official German Charts)	59

As of October 2021, "The Reflex" was the fourth-most streamed Duran Duran song in the UK.

== Certifications and sales ==
Region	Certification	Certified units/sales
Canada (Music Canada)	Platinum	100,000^{^}
Netherlands (NVPI)	Gold	75,000^{^}
United Kingdom (BPI)	Gold	500,000^{^}
United States (RIAA)	Gold	500,000^{^}
^{^} Shipments figures based on certification alone.

== Cover versions ==
Cover versions have been recorded by Less Than Jake and the duo of Kylie Minogue and Ben Lee.

== See also ==
- List of Billboard Hot 100 number-one singles of 1984
- List of Cash Box Top 100 number-one singles of 1984
- List of Dutch Top 40 number-one singles of 1984
- List of European number-one hits of 1984
- List of number-one singles of 1984 (Ireland)
- List of UK Singles Chart number ones of the 1980s
