= The Promise (Arcadia song) =

Single by Arcadia

from the album So Red the Rose
- B-side: "Rose Arcana" (extended)
- Released: 13 January 1986
- Recorded: Studio de la Grande Armée (Paris)
- Length: 4:45 (7" mix); 7:06 (extended remix)
- Label: Parlophone
- Songwriters: Roger Taylor; Nick Rhodes; Simon Le Bon
- Producer: Alex Sadkin

Arcadia singles chronology
| "Goodbye Is Forever" (1986) | "The Promise" (1986) | "The Flame" (1986) |

Music video
- "The Promise" on YouTube

"The Promise" is the third single released by the Duran Duran offshoot band Arcadia. It was released by Parlophone in 1986 as the group's second UK single. It peaked at number 37 on the UK Singles Chart.

The track features an uncredited backing vocal by Sting. Sometime during the band's stay in Paris to record So Red the Rose, they went to see a Sting concert there, and decided it would be interesting to have him come over and sing on the album, mainly because they liked the combination of Sting's and lead singer Simon Le Bon's voices on the "Do They Know It's Christmas?" single by Band Aid, and wanted to see what would result from putting them together again. Sting was very amicable about the whole idea, and it turned out to be one of the band's favourite moments on the record. The song also features guitar by David Gilmour.

== B-sides, bonus tracks and remixes ==
The single mix for "The Promise" was heavily edited down from the album's hefty 7:28 to a leaner, more radio-friendly 4:45. In fact, even Alex Sadkin and Ron Saint Germain's "extended remix" clocked in at only 7:05, almost 25 seconds shy of the album cut.

The B-side to the single was an extended mix of the album track "Rose Arcana".

== Formats and track listings ==
=== 7": Parlophone / NSR 2 (UK) ===
1. "The Promise" (7" mix) – 4:45
2. "Rose Arcana" (extended) – 5:37

Note:

- The album version of "Rose Arcana" has a running time of only 51 seconds.

=== 12": Parlophone / 12 NSR 2 (UK) ===
1. "The Promise" (extended remix) – 7:06
2. "Rose Arcana" (extended) – 5:37
3. "The Promise" (7" mix) – 4:45

== Charts ==
Chart performance for "The Promise"
| Chart (1986) | Peak position |
|---|---|
| UK Singles (Official Charts) | 37 |

== Personnel ==
Arcadia

- Simon Le Bon – vocals
- Nick Rhodes – keyboards
- Roger Taylor – drums

Additional musicians

- Sting – backing vocals
- David Gilmour – guitars
- Mark Egan – fretless bass

Technical

- Alex Sadkin – producer and engineer

== Covers, samples, and media references ==
Novembre covered "The Promise" as a bonus track on their 2006 album Materia.
