= So Red the Rose (album) =

Studio album by Arcadia
- Released: 18 November 1985
- Recorded: April–June 1985
- Studio: Studio de la Grande Armée (Paris)
- Genres: Pop; synth-pop; art rock
- Length: 43:36
- Labels: Parlophone (UK); Capitol/EMI (US)
- Producers: Alex Sadkin; Arcadia

Singles from So Red the Rose
- 1. "Election Day" Released: October 1985; 2. "Goodbye Is Forever" Released: January 1986 (US); 3. "The Promise" Released: January 1986 (UK); 4. "The Flame" Released: July 1986

Professional ratings
Review scores
Source	Rating
AllMusic	3/5 stars
BBC	(2010 special edition, average) link

So Red the Rose is the only studio album by the Duran Duran-spinoff English group Arcadia, released on 18 November 1985 by Parlophone. It included the singles "Election Day", "The Promise", "Goodbye Is Forever" and "The Flame". The album peaked at number 23 on the Billboard 200 in January 1986 and at number 30 on the UK Albums Chart in December 1985.

Musical guests on the album include David Gilmour of Pink Floyd, Herbie Hancock, Grace Jones, and Sting (who provided backing vocals on "The Promise").

The album's artwork featured painted ink drawings by fashion illustrator Tony Viramontes of fashion model Violeta Sanchez as well as an innovative "light space" photograph of the band by Dean Chamberlain, who also directed the video for the song "Missing". Nick Rhodes said of the model Sanchez on the album cover, "She had an elegance to her, an old style classic beauty."

== Box sets ==
As part of EMI's massive Duran Duran reissue plans, a jewel case 3 disc (2CD, 1 DVD) box set of So Red the Rose was released on 12 April 2010. It included the entire album, single mixes, the B-sides "She's Moody and Grey, She's Mean and She's Restless" and "Flame Game" (Yo Homeboy mix), four versions of non-album track "Say the Word" (a track from the soundtrack of Playing for Keeps), and an instrumental mix of "The Promise". The DVD contains the original 1987 video release Arcadia.

In 2008 a previously available, more complete limited edition for Japan fan club (23-track digitally) was remastered into 6 CD single set, comprising all the singles ever released for the So Red the Rose LP, including "Say the Word". The packaging is a 'so red the velvet', faithfully replicating the original single sleeve artwork, plus 8-page fold-out picture booklet of lyrics and biography.

== Encrypted messages ==
Some versions of the album and related singles contained a numeric code in their artwork. This code allocated even numbers to letters, beginning with 16=A, and continuing to 52=S, and then wrapping around to 02=T up to 14=Z. 00 represents either a space or a mid-word capitalisation (being used before the "B" in Le Bon). The numbers on the front cover of the US CD release decode to spell TAYLOR RHODES LE BON (the surnames of the three members of the group). The circular image on the back of the CD insert spells SO RED THE ROSE both forward and backward, while the three letters in the centre are T R L (Taylor/Rhodes/Le Bon)

== Track listing ==
=== 1985 original release ===
All songs written by Simon Le Bon, Nick Rhodes and Roger Taylor, except where noted.

1. "Election Day" – 5:29
2. "Keep Me in the Dark" – 4:31
3. "Goodbye Is Forever" – 3:49
4. "The Flame" – 4:23
5. "Missing" – 3:40 (Le Bon, Rhodes)
6. "Rose Arcana" – 0:51 (Rhodes, Taylor)
7. "The Promise" – 7:30
8. "El Diablo" – 6:05
9. "Lady Ice" – 7:32 (Le Bon, Rhodes)

=== 2010 reissue ===
==== CD1 ====
1. "Election Day" – 5:29
2. "Keep Me in the Dark" – 4:31
3. "Goodbye Is Forever" – 3:49
4. "The Flame" – 4:23
5. "Missing" – 3:40 (Le Bon, Rhodes)
6. "Rose Arcana" – 0:51 (Le Bon, Rhodes)
7. "The Promise" – 7:30
8. "El Diablo" – 6:05
9. "Lady Ice" – 7:32 (Le Bon, Rhodes)
10. "Say the Word" (7" edit) – 4:30 (Le Bon, Rhodes)
11. "Election Day" (single version) – 4:31
12. "Goodbye Is Forever" (single mix) – 4:17
13. "The Promise" (7" mix) – 4:46
14. "The Flame" (7" remix) – 4:06
15. "Say the Word" – 5:08
16. "She's Moody and Grey She's Mean and Restless" – 4:29

==== CD2 ====
1. "Election Day" (Consensus mix) – 8:39
2. "Goodbye Is Forever" (12" extended mix) – 6:45
3. "The Promise" (instrumental) – 5:44
4. "Rose Arcana" – 5:33
5. "The Flame" (extended remix) – 7:17
6. "Say the Word" (extended vocal remix) – 6:33
7. "Election Day" (Cryptic cut) – 9:09
8. "The Promise" (12" mix) – 7:06
9. "Goodbye Is Forever" (dub mix) – 5:15
10. "Say the Word" (extended instrumental remix) – 5:48
11. "Election Day" (early rough mix) – 9:04
12. "Flame Game" (Yo Homeboy mix) – 2:51

==== DVD ====
1. "Introduction"
2. "Filming Election Day"
3. "Election Day"
4. "Filming The Promise"
5. "The Promise"
6. "Filming Goodbye Is Forever"
7. "Goodbye Is Forever"
8. "Filming The Flame"
9. "The Flame"
10. "Filming Missing"
11. "Missing"
12. "Credits"

== Personnel ==
Arcadia

- Simon Le Bon – vocals
- Nick Rhodes – keyboards
- Roger Taylor – drums

Additional musicians

- Mark Egan – bass
- Masami Tsuchiya – guitar
- Carlos Alomar, David Gilmour – additional guitar
- Sting – additional vocals on "The Promise"
- Grace Jones – additional vocals on "Election Day"
- Herbie Hancock – additional keyboards on "The Promise"
- Andy Mackay – saxophone
- Steve Jordan – additional drums on "Lady Ice"
- David Van Tieghem, Manu Katché, Rafael De Jesus – additional percussion
- Wendel Jr. (Percussion Replacement System) – drum programming
- Jean-Claude Dubois – harp
- Masami Tsuchiya, Pierre Defay – violin

Production

- Produced by Alex Sadkin & Arcadia
- Recorded by Larry Alexander; assisted by Phillippe Lafont
- Engineered by Larry Alexander
- Mixed by Larry Alexander, Phil Burnett, Nick Delre, Billy Miranda & Ron Saint-Germain
- Mastered by Bob Ludwig
- Album cover illustration by Tony Viramontes

== Charts ==
Chart performance for So Red the Rose
Chart (1985–1986)	Peak position
Australian Albums (Kent Music Report)	35
Dutch Albums (Album Top 100)	34
German Albums (Offizielle Top 100)	55
New Zealand Albums (RMNZ)	22
Swedish Albums (Sverigetopplistan)	48
UK Albums (Official Charts)	30
US Billboard 200	23

== Certifications ==
Certifications for So Red the Rose
Region	Certification	Certified units/sales
Canada (Music Canada)	2× Platinum	200,000^{^}
United States (RIAA)	Platinum	1,000,000^{^}
^{^} Shipments figures based on certification alone.
