= Seven and the Ragged Tiger =

Studio album by Duran Duran
- Released: 21 November 1983
- Recorded: April–October 1983
- Studios: Mobile studio (Côte d'Azur, France); AIR (Salem, Montserrat); 301 (Sydney, Australia)
- Genres: New wave; synth-pop
- Length: 37:36
- Labels: EMI; Capitol
- Producers: Alex Sadkin; Ian Little; Duran Duran

Duran Duran chronology
Rio (1982)	Seven and the Ragged Tiger (1983)	Arena (1984)

Singles from Seven and the Ragged Tiger
- 1. "Union of the Snake" Released: 17 October 1983; 2. "New Moon on Monday" Released: 23 January 1984; 3. "The Reflex (Remix)" Released: 16 April 1984

Seven and the Ragged Tiger is the third studio album by the English pop rock band Duran Duran, released on 21 November 1983 through EMI and Capitol Records. Co-produced by Alex Sadkin, Ian Little and the band, recording sessions took place in France, the Caribbean and Australia between April and October 1983 following Duran Duran's decision to record outside the UK as tax exiles. Unlike their previous two studio albums, the sessions were marred by a lack of productivity and tensions rose between the band members over its direction.

Wanting a change in direction from their previous studio album Rio, Seven and the Ragged Tiger is a new wave and synth-pop record, with emphasis on synthesiser-based textures. The lyrics are ambiguous and cover a variety of topics; lead vocalist Simon Le Bon described the album as "an adventure story about a little commando team". The title refers to the five band members and their two managers; the "ragged tiger" means success. The cover artwork was shot at the State Library of New South Wales and designed by Malcolm Garrett.

The album received poor critical reviews but was a commercial success, becoming the band's first and only UK number one album. It also charted at number eight in the US, eventually going double platinum. It yielded three singles: "Union of the Snake", "New Moon on Monday" and a remix of "The Reflex" by Nile Rodgers, a UK and US number one. Duran Duran supported the album with a worldwide concert tour that yielded several concert films and a live album. It was the last studio album with the original lineup until 2004's Astronaut. In later decades, Seven and the Ragged Tiger has received mixed reactions, with critics finding weaker songwriting compared to their first two records. It was reissued by EMI in 2010.

== Background ==
By 1983, Duran Duran had established themselves as one of the most successful bands in the world. They were negatively received by the press and their musical peers but enjoyed commercial success following the release of Rio (1982): the non-album single "Is There Something I Should Know?" spent three weeks at number one in the United Kingdom in March 1983. Capitol Records also reissued the band's 1981 self-titled debut album in the United States with an updated sleeve photo and replacing "To the Shore" with the new single to capitalise on its success. Duran Duran underwent an exhaustive press tour and live performances for Rio from March to April before recording commenced on their third studio album.

== Recording history ==
=== French sessions ===
At the decision of their managers, Paul and Michael Berrow, Duran Duran opted to spend a year away from the UK as tax exiles to avoid paying the high tax rates successful British musicians were required to pay. To start writing their third studio album, the band moved into a three-story château in Valbonne, France on the Côte d'Azur in April 1983, utilising the 24-track RAK Mobile recording truck rented from RAK Studios in North London. According to author Stephen Davis, the idea was for work to ensue amidst the lavender-scented hills above the city. This attracted tabloid criticism. In an interview with The Times in 1995, bassist John Taylor stated:

We were recording in the south of France and pretending we were the Rolling Stones when we were only making our third record. We'd just barely moved out of our parents' homes. We didn't know anything about tax years but our managers did and that's why we were there. And that really began a negative roll of publicity.

Duran Duran escaped some of the large media hype surrounding them, which their photographer Denis O'Regan attributed to the château's relaxed atmosphere. The band had parted ways with Colin Thurston, the producer of their first two albums, so Ian Little, the co-producer of "Is There Something I Should Know?", was brought in to produce the sessions. At the château, the instruments were set up in a large empty room upstairs and wired to the recording equipment outside, forcing the musicians to travel back and forth in between takes to verify it was taping properly. The group worked on demos and ideas for three months, although initial reports state it took six weeks. Like their previous albums, the rhythm tracks were recorded first, with lyrics written and taped at a later date.

The sessions commenced slowly due to a lack of new material; John Taylor said that all their material had been used up for the first two albums. The musicians were burned out, so creativity was low. Little later verified that "nothing had been written in advance, so the biggest starting point they'd ever have would be another song". Workdays did not start until 4 p.m. due to the antics of the band members, particularly John, and only lasted a couple of hours. The musicians briefly went to Cannes to visit the music video set of Elton John's "I'm Still Standing", directed by Duran Duran's own video director Russell Mulcahy. On several occasions, the band members individually flew back to the UK for other commitments. Reflecting in his 2008 memoir, guitarist Andy Taylor stated that "it was the start of the megadamage" due to the acceleration of his and John Taylor's cocaine addictions.

Throughout the recording days, Duran Duran primarily wrote through jam sessions, receiving feedback from Little on which parts were worth developing further. The producer introduced to the band a songwriting method he had learned working with Roxy Music's Bryan Ferry and Phil Manzanera, wherein he would create a programmed drum machine groove with effects to inspire musical ideas. Little explained: "Bryan would then vamp on the keyboard and produce what he called a 'moody synth' sound, which was like a pad sound with plenty of movement and character. That would enable him to get a lot of feeling out of a couple of chords, and Duran Duran did the same thing." Using the method, the group yielded what author Steve Malins called several "embryonic ideas", a demo of "Union of the Snake" and an unreleased track titled "Seven and the Ragged Tiger", parts of which evolved into "The Seventh Stranger". According to John Taylor, sketches of the tracks "Of Crime and Passion", "(I'm Looking For) Cracks in the Pavement", "I Take the Dice" and "Spidermouse", which became "New Moon on Monday", were devised during their time in France.

=== Caribbean sessions ===
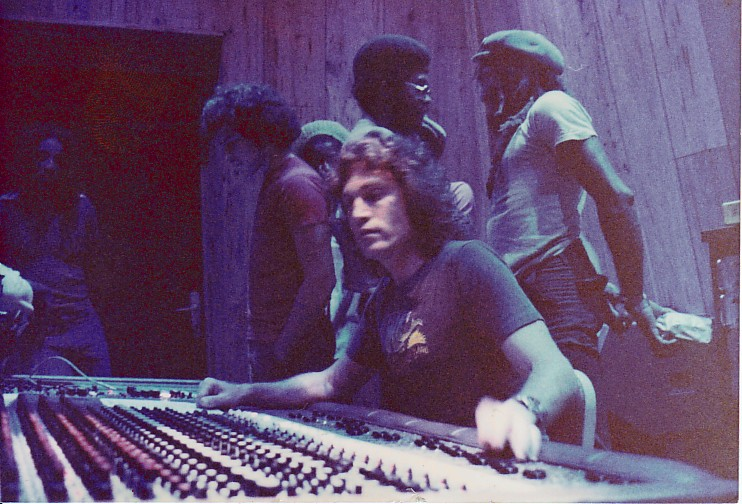
The band hired Alex Sadkin (at the mixing desk, c. 1979) as an additional producer following the France sessions.

To increase concentration amid tabloid scrutiny and paparazzi bombardment, Duran Duran relocated to George Martin's AIR Studios on the Caribbean island of Montserrat to start recording. In his memoir, John Taylor says the group viewed a BBC documentary chronicling the recording of the Police's Synchronicity (1983) at AIR and felt it would be a good fit for Duran Duran. EMI believed Little's inexperience as a producer was slowing down progress and brought in Alex Sadkin to replace Little. Sadkin, the mixer of "Is There Something I Should Know?", felt Little was important to the band's writing process and insisted he stay. Little later said he contributed several ideas despite not receiving any writing credits on the finished album.

Duran Duran spent five to six weeks recording in Montserrat, engineered by Peter Wade-Schwier. Tracks produced at AIR included "The Reflex" and "Union of the Snake" by mid-June 1983, as well as the chorus of "New Moon on Monday". Chic backing vocalists Michelle Cobbs and B. J. Nelson were flown in from New York City to provide backing vocals for "The Reflex". According to Roger Taylor, a lot of the time was spent writing and developing the songs in the studio, given how little material they had from pre-production: "we learned a great deal [from working in Montserrat]... for instance that the studio is not a great place to write songs."

The group encountered both personal and technical problems at AIR, such as tape machines that failed to run at the correct speeds; the production crew were passed off as "whiny and unprofessional" when they complained to the local studio engineers. The band's massive success led to rising tensions between the members. Additionally, keyboardist Nick Rhodes collapsed one day and had to be airlifted to a hospital in Miami, Florida after suffering from paroxysmal tachycardia, or an abnormally fast heartbeat. With a deadline of a Christmas release, Andy Taylor remembered the band members being worried that the album would not be delivered on time.

On 20 July 1983, Duran Duran briefly halted the sessions to play at the Prince's Trust concert with Dire Straits at the Dominion Theatre in London, with Prince Charles and Princess Diana in attendance. (Note: According to John, Duran Duran were Diana's favourite band, while Dire Straits were Charles's favourite.) Having not performed live in several months, Duran Duran were under-rehearsed, leading to a poor performance amidst technical problems, but spoke briefly with the royal couple afterwards. A photograph taken of Diana with singer Simon Le Bon, John Taylor and Andy Taylor made headlines the following day. (Note: A planned assassination attempt on the royal couple during this show failed when the bomb was never placed, as the bomber was an IRA double agent. The agent later said Duran Duran "had no idea how lucky they were".) Three days later, the band played a charity concert at Aston Villa's football stadium, Villa Park, in Birmingham before returning to Montserrat. (Note: Improper financial handling of the event instigated by Paul Berrow meant a public relations disaster for the band, leading to Andy's vocal criticism of the Berrows.)

Upon their return to Montserrat, Steve Sutherland of Melody Maker visited the sessions to check on progress. According to Malins, the band played him eight new songs "in various states of disarray". Sutherland predicted "Union of the Snake" would be the first single, while opining that "['The Reflex'] is sharper and more brutal than anything they've recorded before". The writer was informed by Sadkin that the album was far from completion amidst the studio's technical problems. Sadkin had a hard time producing the record overall and later said he was surprised at how little material the band had.

=== Australian sessions ===
With tensions rising in Montserrat, Duran Duran changed recording locations again, settling in Sydney, Australia at the start of August 1983 as they felt their relationship with the country was special following their previous tours and commercial success there. Over the next two months, the band overdubbed and mixed the album, now called Seven and the Ragged Tiger, at Studios 301. The studio was reportedly inferior to AIR, but superior to the mobile studio in France; the producers found technical problems could be resolved more easily. (Note: At the prior locations, faulty equipment had to be replaced via new ones shipped from the UK, while at 301, the producers could use local equipment for replacements.) Phil Thornalley, Sadkin's personal engineer, assumed the role for these sessions.

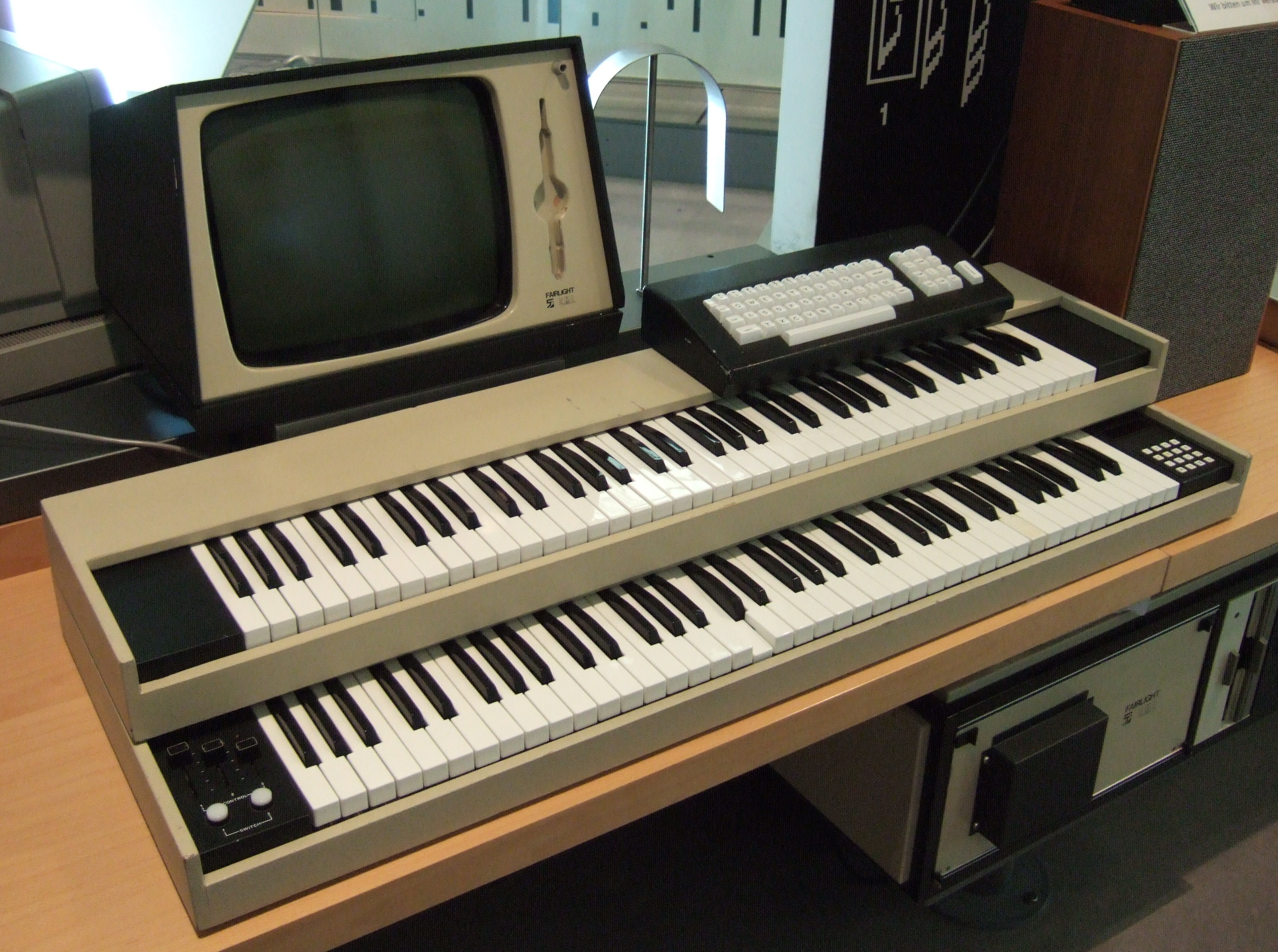
Rhodes used a Fairlight CMI sampling synthesiser to form a new sound for the album.

With the majority of the rhythm tracks cut, the band used 301 to record lyrics, synthesiser and guitar overdubs, and Andy Hamilton's saxophone parts. Le Bon, suffering from writer's block, composed melody lines after listening back to the rhythm parts and wrote lyrics based on those later. Little felt that he was the "least involved" and the "least active" of the five members. Rhodes used a new Fairlight CMI digital sampling synthesiser to help change the band's sound, as he wanted Seven to be a more "sophisticated pop album full of minutiae and multiple textures".

Other members also experimented during the sessions: John Taylor utilised a different technique for his bass playing, playing fewer notes as a way to "get more feel" out of the instrument; drummer Roger Taylor worked with Sadkin to create a more natural sound compared to the "machine-like, rigid beats" of the first two albums; and Andy Taylor used a more melodic style of playing compared to his, in Malins' words, "usual cut-and-thrust". Rafael de Jesus and Mark Kennedy contributed percussion, which Malins felt created a "more exciting, dynamic foundation for the songs". The tracks went through different versions regularly. At this point, the members grew tired of the album's long recording process and tensions rose over its direction. Andy Taylor later described its recording as a "laborious plod", while Rhodes said:

I thought the thing was never going to get finished. Everybody was pulling and tugging in different directions. To me, that album, more than any of them, on the surface of it, there's a lot of pretty songs on there, but then underneath there's this sort of not quite controllable hysteria.

Sadkin and Rhodes discarded several of the rhythm tracks during mixing and received pushback from John Taylor and Andy Taylor over rerecording their parts. Reflecting in his memoir, John Taylor acknowledged the period as the beginning of a split in the band that only grew worse over the next year. (Note: John's increased drug use further sharpened the growing rift. The hostility and slow pace of the sessions led to John and Andy forming the side project the Power Station the following year.) Alongside growing tensions in the studio, the players were forced to relocate from their hotels due to bombardment from fans. Rhodes and Sadkin ultimately worked 15-hour days with Little to mix Seven and the Ragged Tiger, extending into October 1983. By the time the first single, "Union of the Snake", was being mixed, Rhodes and Sadkin only had 24 hours to write and record its B-side, "Secret Oktober", which Malins describes as a "moody electronic-carousel".

== Music and lyrics ==
Commentators have recognised Seven and the Ragged Tiger as a departure from Duran Duran's previous albums, while retaining a new wave style. Richard Buskin of Sound on Sound observed more of a "synth-dance sound", while author Annie Zaleski wrote that Seven is "indebted less to guitar-driven post-punk and more the sleeker synth-pop sounds popular at the time". Writing for AllMusic, Mike DeGagne found that the album's content has the band "moving ever so slightly into a danceclub arena", with "their ability to produce a sexier sound" favouring electronics and instrumentation over "a firm lyrical and musical partnership". Malins agrees, referring to Seven as a "very detailed, technology-based record".

AllMusic's Stewart Mason described the opening track, "The Reflex", as sounding like "an underwritten exercise in art-funk", drawing comparisons to Rio's "Hold Back the Rain". "New Moon on Monday" and "Union of the Snake" showcase the band's influences: the former echoes Roxy Music, while the latter was based on the bass drum pattern for David Bowie's "Let's Dance" (1983). Malins finds the up-tempo tracks "Of Crime and Passion" and "Shadows on Your Side" evoke feelings of insomnia and hysteria. Davis describes "(I'm Looking For) Cracks in the Pavement" as sounding like an homage to the Police with a "carnival vibe". Seven also features an atmospheric, electronic-based instrumental called "Tiger Tiger", dubbed by Davis a "pastoral drone, evoking a jungle painted by Rousseau with hidden tribes playing rattles and sticks". The final track, "The Seventh Stranger", Malins and Davis deem a "moody finale" and a "tepid ballad", respectively.

Le Bon described Seven as "an adventure story about a little commando team". The album's lyrics are ambiguous and cover a variety of topics, including the dark side of fame the band were experiencing ("Shadows on Your Side"), living based on instinct ("The Reflex"), being pulled by an undertow ("Of Crime and Passion") and changing identities as a means of escape ("The Seventh Stranger"). According to Malins, most of the tracks, particularly "Union of the Snake", "I Take the Dice", "Shadows on Your Side" and "(I'm Looking For) Cracks in the Pavement", portray a character in a "manic, slightly deranged state". In "Union of the Snake", the words visualise a dreamlike revolution led by music, and "New Moon on Monday" presents a character's attempt to flatter a shy potential lover. Davis says the lyrics took influence from Le Bon's relationship uncertainties and "romantic ambivalences" with his then-girlfriend.

== Title and packaging ==
The album's title was devised by Le Bon and taken from the unreleased track of the same name. The "seven" refers to the five band members and their two managers, while the "ragged tiger" is success: "Seven people running after success. It's ambition. That's what it's about." Rhodes disliked the title, stating in 1983: "It seems to me like the name of a kids' book, not so much the Famous Five, more sort of piratey." According to Malins, the keyboardist still refers to the LP simply as "the third album".

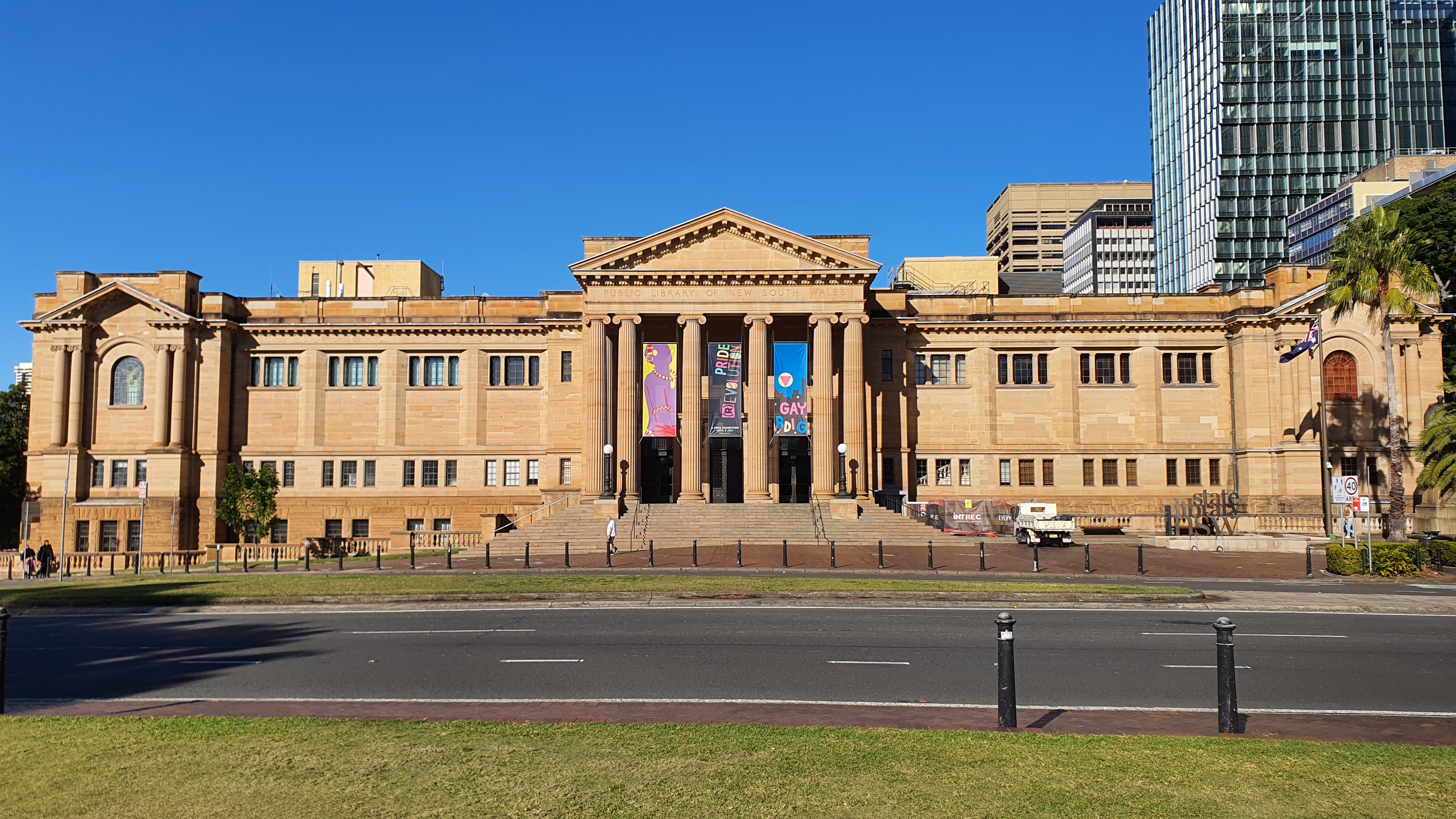
The cover photograph was taken at the State Library of New South Wales (pictured in 2011).

The album cover was shot at the State Library of New South Wales during a photoshoot with the photographer Rebecca Blake. Sleeve designer Malcolm Garrett was flown in from the UK, as well as a live Bengal tiger from Melbourne to be pictured on both the album cover and upcoming tour programme. Surrounded by crew members, local journalists, TV cameramen and fans, Duran Duran were dressed in all-black attire: Rhodes donned a "black lizard suit", John Taylor and Roger Taylor in "evening dress", while Le Bon and Andy Taylor wore suede and leather; John Taylor later quipped in his memoir that "we all looked like successful young men". The shoot reportedly cost upwards of £65,000 (equivalent to £221,001 in 2025).

According to Paul Berrow, the plan was to shoot a promo in Kashmir involving the tiger but Andy Taylor and Rhodes vetoed the idea. Another idea involving the use of smoke bombs was scrapped when the tiger was spooked by them. Garrett's final sleeve design solely features the tiger's eye and a small portion of its fur. Against the caramel-coloured artwork are various logos, including the band's new DD logo, a crescent moon, a triple-X glyph and a Chinese-style antique map depicting snowy mountains and rivers; Davis says this represents the trips Duran Duran ventured on during their upcoming tour. Malins finds the map suggests secrets that are waiting to be unfolded, offering a visual representation of Le Bon's "soul-searching on the album through [the] admittedly ambiguous lyrics".

== Release and singles ==
The music video for "Union of the Snake", featuring the band members in a cave with serpent-like dancers and Le Bon as leather-wearing road warrior, was sent to MTV by Capitol a full week before the single was set to release to radio, drawing pushback from radio stations who found the move unfair. According to John Taylor, the band expressed distaste for the video. Upon its release as a single on 17 October 1983, "Union of the Snake" peaked at number three in both the UK and the US. Following the number one debut of "Is There Something I Should Know?", the group's failure to hit number one led some critics to conclude Duran Duran had hit their peak.

Seven and the Ragged Tiger was released a month later on 21 November 1983, shortly after the band commenced a worldwide tour. It entered the UK Albums Chart at number one, becoming the band's first album to top the chart, although sales fell off more quickly than EMI had expected. When it debuted on the US Billboard Top LPs & Tape chart, both Rio and the reissued Duran Duran were still high on the chart. It reached number eight and within months achieved platinum status with sales of one million units, eventually going double platinum. Elsewhere, Seven and the Ragged Tiger topped the charts in the Netherlands and New Zealand, and it reached number two in Australia, three in Finland, seven in Canada, 11 in Austria, 12 in Italy, 14 in Norway, 16 in Switzerland, 17 in Germany and 19 in Sweden.

"New Moon on Monday" was issued as the second single on 23 January 1984, backed by a remix of "Tiger Tiger". Its ambitious video, directed by Mulcahy's colleague Brian Grant, contained images of a medieval French town and was shot during a two-day shoot in Paris before the tour resumed in Japan. Hated by the band members, the video received heavy airplay on MTV. The single itself stalled at number nine in the UK and number ten in the US. With both singles performing below the label's expectations, EMI executives grew concerned that Sadkin lacked the skill to produce a successful single for Duran Duran.

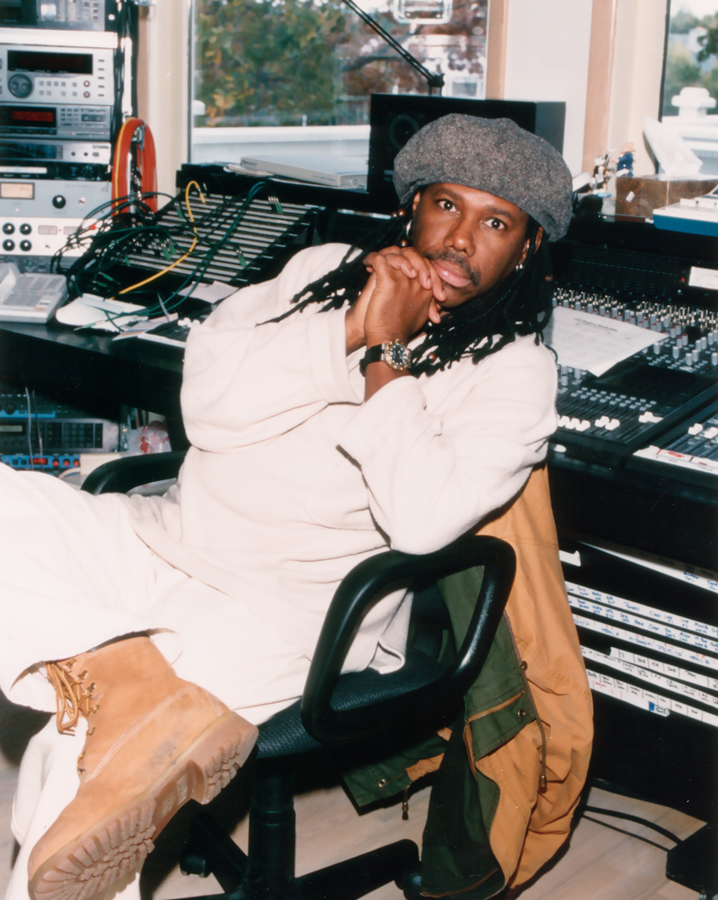
Nile Rodgers (pictured in 1999) remixed "The Reflex" for release as a single.

While in Australia on tour, John Taylor heard a prerelease copy of the INXS single "Original Sin", produced by Chic member Nile Rodgers and engineered by Jason Corsaro, and felt a remix of "The Reflex" would perform well as a single. For the remix, Rodgers made the song more dance-oriented, adding looping vocals, additional percussion, increased the tempo and cut the runtime. John said it initially received pushback from EMI and Capitol; according to Andy Taylor, they felt it was "too black" for Duran Duran. Executives were eventually convinced and upon release as the third single on 16 April 1984, the remixed song became the band's first US and second UK number one single. (Note: The B-side was a live rendition of Rio's "New Religion" in the US and a live version of Steve Harley & Cockney Rebel's "Make Me Smile (Come Up and See Me)" in the UK.) Its success boosted sales for Seven and the Ragged Tiger five months after its release. The single's accompanying video was shot by Mulcahy over two days at the Maple Leaf Gardens in Toronto; John wanted the video to be taken from a live show as a way to showcase their strength as a live band and to dismiss interviewers who referred to Duran Duran solely as a "video band".

== Critical reception ==
Professional ratings
Initial reviews
Review scores
Source	Rating
Record Mirror	1/5 stars
Smash Hits	8/10
The Village Voice	C+

Reviews for Seven and the Ragged Tiger were predominantly negative upon its release. Critics cited poor lyrics and found the group utilised their musical influences in unoriginal ways. (Note: Attributed to multiple references:) Record Mirror's Jim Reid felt the record marked the first chapter in the band's decline, deeming the music "no more than a sub-art school mix of plagiarism" and the lyrics "chickenfeed mysteries that neither say or mean anything". Reid found the LP "bad as in pathetic, useless, no good" and a "painful [listening] experience" that showcases the group's "mediocre talent". Ira Robbins was also negative in Trouser Press, describing Seven as "a harmless, useless mishmash of old riffs and weak songs" that represents a step backward from Rio. He argued the band were "too talented to be satisfied with such a dismal showing". Sounds dubbed the record "Seven and the Rancid Ravings", arguing that it is "so assuredly awful it breaks new ground in badness", and concluding: "Seven is more redolent of illness – a nervous disorder of people near to cracking up – than it is of just being an amusingly dreadful recording." In NME, Paolo Hewitt argued that pop stars are only interested in themselves, with Duran Duran being "perhaps the most striking example", criticising the lyrics as "attempting to add drama and shade" to the material's "already weak structures".

Among positive reviews, Melody Maker's Michael Oldfield found the album a bold move at this stage of the band's career, in which they solidify the 1980s dancefloor sound and simultaneously put an end to their "wimpish image". He also said that Seven "restores danger and menace to a band that was veering dangerously close to the insipid". Billboard acknowledged a refinement in the style exhibited on prior works that equated to a "well-crafted set" that "yields fresh bursts of their now familiar choral sound, more playful eroticism and plenty of dance-oriented rhythmic momentum for their club fans", giving particular recognition to the production. Peter Martin of Smash Hits wrote: "The arrangements are watertight, the melodies are razor-sharp and every number is drenched with the mystique of a James Bond theme. A classy concoction, it should ensure they'll be around for quite a while yet." In a more mixed review, Robert Christgau of The Village Voice stated that "as public figures and maybe as people, these imperialist wimps are the most deplorable pop stars of the post-punk if not post-Presley era," calling the lyrics "obtuse at best," and said "if you'd sooner listen to a machine sing than Simon Le Bon, what are you going to do with both?" However, he praised the album's singles as being "twice as pleasurable as anything Thomas Dolby is synthesizing these days".

== Tour ==
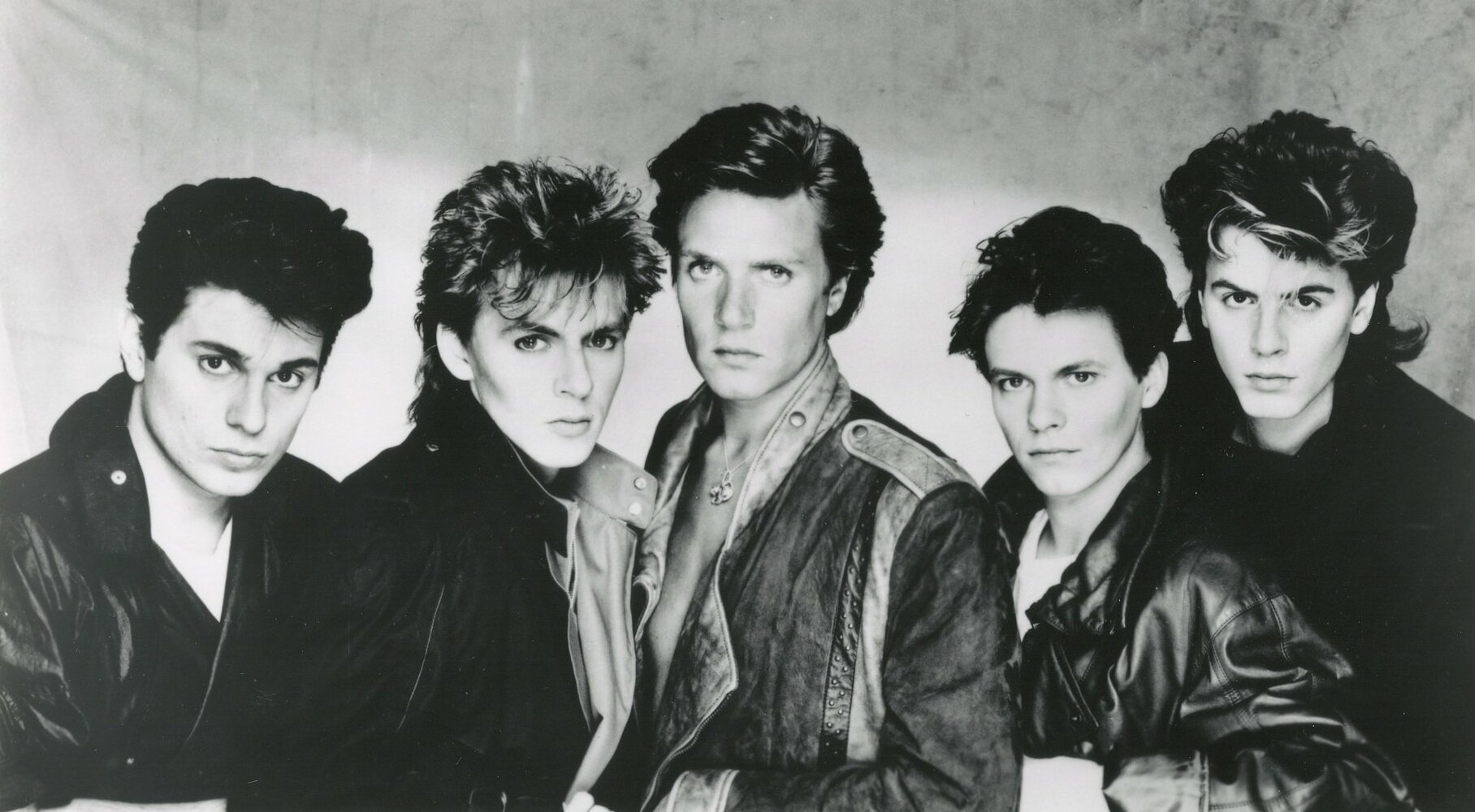
Duran Duran in 1983

To support Seven and the Ragged Tiger, Duran Duran embarked on a world tour that covered shows in Australia, Japan, England, the US and Canada. Dubbed the Sing Blue Silver Tour after a lyric in Rio's "The Chauffeur", the tour was documented by a film crew, directed by Mulcahy. It commenced in Canberra, Australia in mid-November 1983 before returning to the UK for concerts in London in early December. A short seven-date leg of Japan occurred throughout mid-to-late January 1984. In Japan, Duran Duran played at larger venues than they were used to; audiences screamed so loud they could not hear themselves play. Throughout the tour, the ensemble displayed a harder and heavier sound compared to the supporting album. Roger Taylor stated: "The guitar is more upfront. We go for more power and everyone projects a lot. It's basically a rock show. We're not a synthesiser band."

The North American leg commenced at the end of January; according to Malins, the band members were on an "adrenaline-charged 'voyage of discovery'". While on the road in February, the band won two Grammy Awards in the new Best Long Form and Best Short Form music video categories, (Note: The band did not attend the ceremony as it took place after a show in Pittsburgh. Andy reportedly felt the event would have been a great opportunity to perform live on American television and became more fraught with their management after the Berrows neglected to inform them of their award winnings.) and appeared on the cover of Rolling Stone magazine, who dubbed them the "Fab Five" in comparison to the Beatles.

The tour was massively successful, including through the selling of merchandise, but the non-stop touring schedule took a toll on the band members by the end of February. The cold weather and constant use of drugs and alcohol led to increased tensions and fights amongst the players. According to Malins, inflated egos led to rampant behavior, particularly from Andy Taylor. In March, Duran Duran continued playing in the northeastern US and Canada before playing two sold-out shows at Madison Square Garden, achieving a goal they had made when they signed to EMI in 1981.

The Sing Blue Silver Tour continued around the US, concluding in San Diego in mid-April. By the final dates, John Taylor was doing drugs on stage. Footage from the shows in Oakland, California were compiled for the concert film Arena (1985). A planned European leg was cancelled due to the band's exhaustion. It was the final tour of the 1980s with the original lineup. At its end, the band filmed more material for Arena using studio sets; the film was released in late 1984 along with a documentary about the tour, titled Sing Blue Silver; an edited one-hour cut of Arena, titled As the Lights Go Down, was broadcast on several US channels. Live recordings from across the tour and a new studio song, the Rodgers-produced "The Wild Boys", were compiled and released in late 1984 on a live album, also titled Arena.

== Legacy ==
Professional ratings
Retrospective reviews
Review scores
Source	Rating
AllMusic	4/5 stars
Classic Pop	3/5 stars
The Daily Telegraph	3/5 stars
The Encyclopedia of Popular Music	2/5 stars
Q	3/5 stars
Rolling Stone	3/5 stars
The Rolling Stone Album Guide	3.5/5 stars
Spin Alternative Record Guide	6/10

Seven and the Ragged Tiger was Duran Duran's final studio album with the original five-piece line-up until 2004's Astronaut. After recording "The Wild Boys", the band members mostly collaborated on different projects from 1984 to 1985: Andy Taylor and John Taylor formed the supergroup the Power Station with the singer Robert Palmer and Chic's former drummer Tony Thompson, while Le Bon, Rhodes and Roger recorded a studio album, So Red the Rose (1985), as Arcadia. Duran Duran briefly regrouped to record the title song of the James Bond film A View to a Kill (1985) before Andy and Roger departed the band shortly before the recording of their Rodgers-produced fourth studio album Notorious (1986).

In later decades, Seven and the Ragged Tiger continues to receive mixed reactions. In a retrospective review, DeGagne found Seven fails to match the "unrestrained pop/rock ebullience" of Rio with weaker songwriting, as well as favouring synthesisers over Andy Taylor's guitar stylings, but still displays strong singles and enough musicality to equal a "bright, energetic and effectual" record. Writing for The Daily Telegraph, Thomas H. Green described Seven as "opulently produced", with "their new romantic origins blooming into lush decadent pop". Chris Gerard found the album more uneven in Metro Weekly but argued Seven predicted the musical direction of both So Red the Rose and Notorious. Writing in 2009, Pitchfork's Tom Ewing referred to Seven as a disappointment compared to Rio.

In his biography of the band, Malins contends that the album's primary flaw is a "lack of punch and power", and its "frenzied, chaotic bluster" lacks the effectiveness of Rio. In his book Please Please Tell Me Now, Davis opines that good lyrics were "hard-earned" as Le Bon's "beatnik muse" had vanished. In his memoir, John Taylor stated the whole band were not satisfied with the album musically. The bassist felt Seven was anticlimactic after Rio, writing: "Seven and the Ragged Tiger is a beautifully textured record, but it didn't hit you viscerally in the way the earlier albums had."

EMI re-released Seven and the Ragged Tiger in 2010 in two configurations: a two-disc digipak and a three-disc box set, featuring two CDs and one DVD, which included the first official release of the As the Lights Go Down video. Like the reissue of their debut released the same year, the remastering had a negative reaction from fans as a victim of the loudness war. Andy Taylor, who had left the band by that point, criticised the remaster, saying that it "sounds like it was done down the pub" and condemned EMI for promoting the demos as bonus tracks: "They should be gifting them to fans after 30 years of support...shame on all involved". EMI refused to recall the reissue because complaints about its sound quality were, according to the label, "by far in the minority".

== Track listing ==
All tracks are written by Simon Le Bon, Andy Taylor, John Taylor, Roger Taylor and Nick Rhodes, except where noted.

Side A
No.	Title	Length
1.	"The Reflex"	5:26
2.	"New Moon on Monday"	4:15
3.	"(I'm Looking for) Cracks in the Pavement"	3:38
4.	"I Take the Dice"	3:15
5.	"Of Crime and Passion"	3:48

Side B
No.	Title	Length
1.	"Union of the Snake"	4:20
2.	"Shadows on Your Side"	4:03
3.	"Tiger Tiger"	3:20
4.	"The Seventh Stranger"	5:24

2010 limited edition CD 2
No.	Title	Writer(s)	Length
1.	"Is There Something I Should Know?"		4:11
2.	"Faith in This Colour"		4:07
3.	"Faith in This Colour" (alternate slow mix)		4:06
4.	"Secret Oktober"		2:45
5.	"Tiger Tiger" (Ian Little remix)		3:25
6.	"The Reflex" (single version)		4:25
7.	"Make Me Smile (Come Up and See Me)" (live)	Steve Harley	4:58
8.	"New Religion" (live at the LA Forum 9/2/84)		5:47
9.	"The Reflex" (live at the LA Forum 9/2/84)		5:59
10.	"Is There Something I Should Know?" (monster mix)		6:40
11.	"Union of the Snake" (monkey mix)		6:26
12.	"New Moon on Monday" (dance mix)		6:03
13.	"The Reflex" (dance mix)		6:35

== Personnel ==
Credits adapted from AllMusic:

Duran Duran

- Simon Le Bon – lead vocals
- Andy Taylor – guitar
- John Taylor – bass
- Roger Taylor – drums
- Nick Rhodes – keyboards

Additional musicians

- Andy Hamilton – soprano and tenor saxophone
- Rafael de Jesus – percussion
- Mark Kennedy – percussion
- Michelle Cobbs – backing vocals on "Union of the Snake" and "The Reflex"
- B. J. Nelson – backing vocals on "Union of the Snake" and "The Reflex"

Production

- Alex Sadkin – producer
- Ian Little – associate producer
- Duran Duran – associate producers
- Phil Thornalley – recording and mixing engineer
- Peter Wade-Schwier – recording engineer
- Jim Taig – tape operator
- Malcolm Garrett – graphic design
- Keith Breeden – illustration

== Charts ==
=== Weekly charts ===
Weekly chart performance for Seven and the Ragged Tiger
Chart (1983–1984)	Peak position
Australian Albums (Kent Music Report)	2
Austrian Albums (Ö3 Austria)	11
Canada Top Albums/CDs (RPM)	7
Dutch Albums (Album Top 100)	1
European Albums (Eurotipsheet)	8
Finnish Albums (Suomen virallinen lista)	3
German Albums (Offizielle Top 100)	17
Italian Albums (Musica e dischi)	12
New Zealand Albums (RMNZ)	1
Norwegian Albums (VG-lista)	14
Swedish Albums (Sverigetopplistan)	19
Swiss Albums (Schweizer Hitparade)	16
UK Albums Chart	1
US Billboard Top LPs & Tape	8

2024 weekly chart performance for Seven and the Ragged Tiger
Chart (2024)	Peak position
Hungarian Physical Albums (MAHASZ)	11

=== Year-end charts ===
1983 year-end chart performance for Seven and the Ragged Tiger
Chart (1983)	Position
Australian Albums (Kent Music Report)	86
UK Albums (Gallup)	24

1984 year-end chart performance for Seven and the Ragged Tiger
Chart (1984)	Position
Canada Top Albums/CDs (RPM)	15
Dutch Albums (Album Top 100)	7
German Albums (Offizielle Top 100)	37
New Zealand Albums (RMNZ)	18
UK Albums (Gallup)	53
US Billboard Top LPs & Tape	10

== Certifications and sales ==
Certifications and sales for Seven and the Ragged Tiger
Region	Certification	Certified units/sales
Canada (Music Canada)	3× Platinum	300,000^{^}
Finland (Musiikkituottajat)	Gold	25,000
Japan	—	150,000
Netherlands (NVPI)	Gold	50,000^{^}
New Zealand (RMNZ)	Platinum	15,000^{^}
Yugoslavia	—	48,079
Switzerland (IFPI Switzerland)	Gold	25,000^{^}
United Kingdom (BPI)	Platinum	300,000^{^}
United States (RIAA)	2× Platinum	2,000,000^{^}
^{^} Shipments figures based on certification alone.
