= The Flame (Arcadia song) =

Single by Arcadia

from the album So Red the Rose
- B-side: "Flame Game" (Yo Homeboy mix)
- Released: April 1986 (US); 7 July 1986 (UK)
- Recorded: Studio de la Grande Armée (Paris)
- Genre: Art rock; pop; synth-pop
- Length: 4:23 (album version); 4:06 (7" remix); 7:18 (extended remix)
- Label: Parlophone
- Songwriter(s): Roger Taylor; Nick Rhodes; Simon Le Bon
- Producer(s): Alex Sadkin

Arcadia singles chronology
"The Promise" (1986)	"The Flame" (1986)	"Say the Word" (1986)

Music video
- "The Flame" on YouTube

"The Flame" is the fourth single released by the Duran Duran offshoot band Arcadia. It was released by Parlophone in 1986 and was the group's third UK single. It reached number 58 in the UK Singles Chart.

== Music video ==
The campy, slapstick video was made in the retro style of an Edwardian-era drawing room murder mystery, à la Agatha Christie and Alfred Hitchcock. The storyline revolved around a series of comic disasters that befall an awkward, nerdish character (played by Simon Le Bon) and his girlfriend while visiting a haunted house. Nick Rhodes plays the debonair host of the dinner party at the house, and he frequently uses Le Bon as his comic stooge for a number of macabre and mildly sadistic visual gags. Various unsavory bits of business ensue with revolving walls, trapdoors and mysterious assassins hidden behind paintings and within exotic taxidermied animals. The slapstick comic interplay between Rhodes and Le Bon is faintly reminiscent of Abbott and Costello.

At one point, John Taylor (at the time a member of the Power Station, the other Duran Duran side project) comes out of the closet with a contract for the band to sign. This is an especially pointed inside joke, as it was around this time that the three remaining Duran Duran members were preparing to write and record their next album, Notorious, while in legal negotiations with their now-estranged guitarist Andy Taylor.

The video's treatment is said to have been written by Rhodes and the various near-fatal pratfalls that occur to Le Bon's character was intended as punishment for his decision to enter the Fastnet yachting race that almost cost him his life in August 1985.

In fact, Le Bon was in the middle of the South American leg of the 1986 Whitbread Round the World Race yacht race when he had to fly to Spain in April to shoot the video. He then flew straight back to rejoin his team in Uruguay.

The video was directed by longtime collaborator Russell Mulcahy.

== B-sides, bonus tracks and remixes ==
All officially released remixes of "The Flame"—the single remix, extended remix and the "Yo Homeboy" mix—were done by Nile Rodgers.

== Formats and track listings ==
=== 7": Parlophone / NSR 3 (United Kingdom) ===
1. "The Flame" (remix) – 4:06
2. "Flame Game" (Yo Homeboy mix) – 2:49

=== 12": Parlophone / 12 NSR 3 (United Kingdom) ===
1. "The Flame" (extended remix) – 7:12
2. "Flame Game" (Yo Homeboy mix) – 2:49
3. "Election Day" (early rough mix) – 8:58
- Track 1 is also known as the "extended mix".

=== 7": Capitol / B-5570 (United States) ===
1. "The Flame" (remix) – 4:06
2. "Flame Game" (Yo Homeboy mix) – 2:49

=== 12": Capitol / V-15246 (United States) ===
1. "The Flame" (extended remix) – 7:18
2. "Flame Game" (Yo Homeboy mix) – 2:49
3. "Election Day" (an early rough mix) – 8:58
- Track 1 is a different mix to the UK 12-inch.
- Track 1 is also known as the "extended mix".
- Track 3 is labelled as "an early rough mix" in the US and "early rough mix" in the UK.

== Charts ==
Chart performance for "The Flame"
Chart (1986)	Peak position
Netherlands (Single Top 100)	38
UK Singles (OCC)	58

== Personnel ==
Arcadia

- Simon Le Bon – vocals
- Nick Rhodes – keyboards
- Roger Taylor – drums

Technical

- Alex Sadkin – producer and engineer
