= Duran Duran: A Hollywood High =

- Directed by: Gavin Elder; Vincent Adam Paul; George Scott
- Produced by: James Belsham; Ian Brenchley; Wendy Laister
- Starring: Simon Le Bon; Nick Rhodes; John Taylor; Roger Taylor
- Edited by: Gavin Elder; Scott Given; Phil McDonald
- Production company: Lastman Media
- Distributed by: Lastman Media and Abramorama
- Release date: 2022
- Running time: 75 minutes
- Country: United Kingdom
- Language: English
- Budget: $600,000 (estimated)

Duran Duran: A Hollywood High is an English language musical concert film directed by Gavin Elder and starring Simon Le Bon, Nick Rhodes, John Taylor and Roger Taylor. The stars of this film are members of English new wave band Duran Duran.

== Cast ==
- Simon Le Bon
- Nick Rhodes
- John Taylor
- Roger Taylor
