= Rum Runner (nightclub) =

Former nightclub in Birmingham, England

- Interactive map of Rum Runner
- Address: 273 Broad Street; Birmingham; England
- Coordinates: 52.47794°N 1.91073°W
- Owner: Ray, Don, Tissy Berrow
- Type: Casino (former); Nightclub

Construction
- Opened: 1967
- Renovated: Late 1970s
- Closed: 1987
- Demolished: 1987
- Years active: 1967–1987

The Rum Runner was a nightclub on Broad Street, Birmingham. The club operated from 1964 until its demolition in 1987.

== History ==
Originally a casino, the Rum Runner became a more conventional club in the 1970s. One of its first house bands, playing popular cover versions, went on to become the worldwide acclaimed UK Arena band Magnum featuring Bob Catley and Tony Clarkin. They left the club in 1975 to play their own material of melodic rock. Occasionally other live acts played such as Quill and Jigsaw.

Regular late night clientele were Black Sabbath, Roy Wood, Quartz and other notable Birmingham bands calling in after local gigs. Actors and staff from the nearby Central TV Studios also frequented the club.

In the late 1970s, the club was renovated by Paul and Michael Berrow, sons of the club's founder, based on ideas drawn from a visit to Studio 54 in New York City.

In 1978, local band Duran Duran brought in a demo tape, and were offered a rehearsal space and jobs around the club: drummer Roger Taylor working as a glass collector, guitarist Andy Taylor cooking and maintaining the interior, bassist John Taylor working as a bouncer, and keyboardist Nick Rhodes DJing. The group became the resident band at the club. After playing their 1983 charity concert at Villa Park, they held the afterparty at the Rum Runner. In 2006 John Taylor and Nick Rhodes released a compilation album entitled Only After Dark, featuring their favourite songs from the Rum Runner playlist.

Birmingham Civic Society commemorative plaque to the Rum Runner Club

In developing the club's musical identity, the club offered its rooms as free rehearsal space to bands including Dexys Midnight Runners and UB40, with The Beat filming a video for their song "Mirror in the Bathroom" in the club.

The club hosted Mulligan, Martin Degville, other members of Sigue Sigue Sputnik, and fashion designers Kahn & Bell.

In 1987, the buildiIng was demolished and the "Soloman Cutler" Wetherspoons pub was subsequently built on the site.

In 2022, Birmingham Civic Society awarded a commemorative blue plaque on the Rum Runner Works, 2 Bridge Street, B1 2JZ.
