= As the Lights Go Down =

- March 2010 MP3 + DVD release

Video by Duran Duran
- Released: MP3 + DVD - March 2010
- Recorded: 1984
- Genre: Dance, new wave
- Director: Russell Mulcahy

Duran Duran's Oakland, California concerts that were filmed for the Arena (An Absurd Notion) movie were also edited to form the one-hour As the Lights Go Down concert video. The name comes from a lyric in the song "Shadows on Your Side" from the Seven and the Ragged Tiger album.

As the Lights Go Down is essentially the Arena video without the theatrical sequences, although the live footage for many songs was edited differently. This version was first aired on the Cinemax (advertised as "Duran Duran The Video Concert") cable television channel, and later on MTV and other music channels. The concert was also shown on British television channel ITV, on 30 December 1984 at 17:00. At least two versions exist.

Bootleg DVDs of the video frequently appear on auction sites. In 2015, there was an official DVD release that was sold as a bonus disc in the March 2010 special edition re-issue of the Seven and the Ragged Tiger album, which uses the North American track listing.

In April 2019, Duran Duran released a remastered version of As the Lights Go Down on vinyl for Record Store Day 2019.

Rock Band 2 featured the live version of "Hungry Like the Wolf" as included in this video and the Arena album/video.

== Track listing ==
1. Intro: Tiger Tiger
2. Is There Something I Should Know?
3. Hungry Like the Wolf
4. Union of the Snake
5. New Religion
6. Save a Prayer
7. Rio
8. The Seventh Stranger
9. The Chauffeur
10. Planet Earth
11. Careless Memories
12. Girls On Film

For the European version, the track "Rio" was replaced with the music video for "The Reflex".
