= Riviera F =

British band

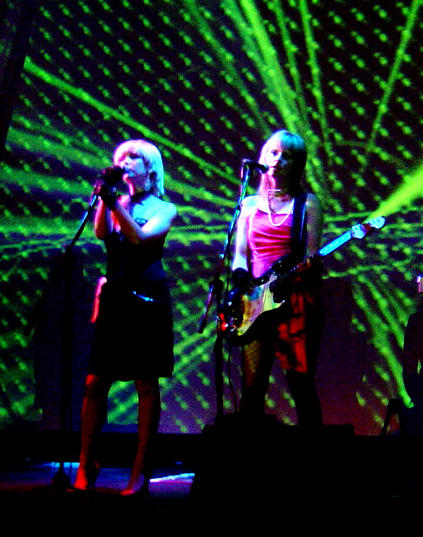
- Alexa Marlen-vocals/keys, Kairo Sin-guitar

Background information
- Origin: London, England
- Genre: Electropop
- Labels: Germ Free Records; Tape Modern; Kinetik Media
- Members: Alexa Marlen (vocals); Kairo Sin(guitar)
- Website: http://www.rivieraf.co.uk

Riviera F is an electropop band created in London, England. The band consists of Alexa Marlen and Kairo Sin. Other members included Taylor Sloane, Nikki Paris, Logan Sky, Yves Cecil and Etienne LeBeau (AKA LA shoe designer Jerome Chouinard-Rousseau). They were known as Riviera up until 2003, then changed the name to Riviera F. To date they have had two releases. In 2004 the International Lover EP, (a 5 track EP of which the title track was produced by Duran Duran's Nick Rhodes) was released on Pop Cult and Tape Modern (Nick Rhodes and Stephen Duffy's label) which had previously released Dark Circles by The Devils. 2004 also saw the release of their US single "Now We've Got Europe" on Kinetik Media.

The International Lover video, directed by Matt Amato (member of the Los Angeles based artist and directors collaborative 'The Masses') and starring Hollywood film star Billy Zane, was featured in Hollywood’s Resfest film festival.

The band played their first ever gig on the BBC’s Radio 1 John Peel Sessions. They have played and DJed alongside artists such as Hot Chip, Ladytron, Vive la Fête, Client (band), Ellen Allien, Annie (Norwegian singer) and Yelle, as well as at Kick the Trash festival in Madrid and the House Of Love Festival in Helsinki, and have toured extensively in the UK and Europe. The band has been featured in publications such as Dazed & Confused and The Independent on Sunday, which described "Tracks such as "International Lover", "Kiss No.38" ("in the back of a limousine", indeed) and "Now We've Got Europe" display an acute appreciation of continental romance and ageless glamour".

Riviera F's debut album Another City Another Plan was released in 2010 on their own record label Germ Free.

== Discography ==
=== Albums ===
- Another City Another Plan - Germ Free (2010)
1. "Hell On The Way"
2. "Girls & Money"
3. "Posing For The Cameras"
4. "Pick Up star"
5. "Dance To The Beat"
6. "Echo Beach"
7. "Dance Alone"
8. "Lya Taboo"
9. "Take You Down"
10. "The Last Time"

=== EPs ===
- International Lover - Pop Cult/Tape Modern (2004)
1. "International Lover"
2. "Information"
3. "Nothing"
4. "Girls and Money"
5. "Another Crash and Burn"

=== Singles ===
- Now We've Got Europe - Kinetik Media (2004)
1. "Now We've Got Europe"
2. "Information"
3. "Now We've Got Europe (Blue Mix)"

=== Compilations ===
- This Is Hardcore - God Made Me Hardcore (2002)
1. "International Lover"
- Robopop Volume I - Lucky Pierre Recordings (2003)
1. "Information"
- Snakebite City Eleven - Bluefire Records (2004)
1. "Lya Taboo"
2. "Pick Up Star"
- Miami Resistance Vol. 1 - Kinetik Media (2005)
1. "Girls & Money"
- Dream Boyz - DD Fan Club (2006)
1. "International Lover"

=== Collaborations ===
- Five Minute Love - Feria Music, Ojoparlante (2008)
1. "When The Rain Begins To Fall"
