= Say the Word (Arcadia song) =

- US 7-inch single sleeve

Single by Arcadia

from the album Playing for Keeps OST
- B-side: "Say the Word" (instrumental mix)
- Released: September 1986
- Genre: Art rock; pop; synth-pop
- Length: 5:07 (original soundtrack version); 4:29 (single version); 4:31 (instrumental mix); 5:49 (instrumental extended remix)
- Label: Atlantic
- Songwriter(s): Nick Rhodes; Simon Le Bon
- Producer(s): Alex Sadkin; Arcadia

Arcadia singles chronology
"The Flame" (1986)	"Say the Word" (1986)

Music video
- "Say the Word" on YouTube

"Say the Word" is the fifth and final single released by the Duran Duran offshoot band Arcadia. Recorded for the soundtrack of Playing for Keeps, it was released as a single in the US by Atlantic Records.

== Music video ==
The original video was an amalgam of previous Arcadia videos, interspersed with scenes from the film.

A new version that keeps an amalgam of previous Arcadia videos, but removed the interspersed scenes from the film was released on Duran Duran's official YouTube page.

== Formats and track listings ==
=== 7": Atlantic / 7-89370 (US) ===
1. "Say the Word" (LP version) – 4:29
2. "Say the Word" (instrumental mix) – 4:31
- The original version on the Playing for Keeps soundtrack has a length of 5:07, the labelling of the A-side on the single release as the "LP version" is a misprint.

=== 7": Atlantic / PROMO / 7-89370 (US) ===
1. "Say the Word" (LP version) – 4:29
2. "Say the Word" (LP version) – 4:29

=== 7": Atlantic / PROMO / 78-93707 (CA) ===
1. "Say the Word" (LP version) – 4:29
2. "Say the Word" (instrumental mix) – 4:29

=== 7": Atlantic / 78-93707 (CA) ===
1. "Say the Word" (LP version) – 4:29
2. "Say the Word" (instrumental mix) – 4:29
- All Canadian releases contain a misspressing with an incorrect song, which is instrumental, that has a time of 3:31.
- According to Nick Rhodes, who listened to the unknown song in January 2009, this track is not Arcadia and it seems as if a pressing plant error caused an unknown artist to be substituted instead of the instrumental Arcadia track, which does actually exist and appears in its correct form on the US 7-inch release.

=== 12": Atlantic / PROMO / PR939 (US) ===
1. "Say the Word" (extended remix) – 6:39
2. "Say the Word" (instrumental extended remix) – 5:49
- This record was only released as a promotional 12-inch in the United States. No stock copies were ever made.

== Credits ==
- Engineer [Remix] – Michael Hutchinson
- Producer – Alex Sadkin, Arcadia
- Producer [Additional Production], Remix – Shep Pettibone
- Written-By – Simon Le Bon, Nick Rhodes
