= Ippu-Do =

Japanese musical group

Ippu-Do 一風堂
- Origin: Japan
- Genres: Art pop, pop rock, synth-pop, new wave, power pop, electronic, sophisti-pop, progressive pop, progressive rock (early)
- Years active: 1979–1981; 1983–1984
- Labels: Epic, Sony Music Entertainment
- Past members: Masami Tsuchiya; Akira Mitake; Shoji Fujii

Ippu-Do (一風堂) was a Japanese electronic music group of the early 1980s, led by singer-songwriter Masami Tsuchiya.

== History ==
Ippu-Do debuted in 1979 with Normal, made up of Tsuchiya on vocals and guitar, Akira Mitake on keyboards, and Shoji Fujii on drums. Between 1980 and 1981 they released two follow-ups, Real and Radio Fantasy, the latter of which would be their first release outside Japan.

Ippu-Do released the single "Sumire September Love" in 1982. The song was used in a Kanebo Cosmetics commercial starring American actress Brooke Shields. This led to "Sumire September Love" becoming their most successful single, selling 452,000 copies in Japan. The group thereafter went on hiatus, with Tsuchiya playing guitar with the British band Japan on their final tour in 1982, and beginning a solo career.

The group briefly reappeared in 1983 as a duo of Tsuchiya and Mitake, recording the studio album Night Mirage, and the live Live And Zen, supported on both releases by drummer Steve Jansen and keyboardist Richard Barbieri of Japan, and bassist Percy Jones. Tsuchiya subsequently returned to his solo career, releasing several more albums in the 80s and beyond.

A 1998 compilation entitled Very Best September Love combined both group and Tsuchiya solo work, while 2010's Essence covered only group selections, including the first appearance on CD of some tracks. 2006 saw the release of a 7 CD + 1 DVD box set entitled Magic Vox – Ippu-Do Era 1979–1984, containing all five group albums, Tsuchiya's first solo album Rice Music from 1982, and a 1983 solo album by Mitake.

== Discography ==
=== Studio albums ===
- (1979) Normal
- (1980) Real
- (1981) Radio Fantasy
- (1983) Night Mirage

=== Singles ===
- (1982) "Sumire September Love"

=== Live album ===
- (1984) Live and Zen (recorded June 1983)

=== Compilations ===
- (1982) Lunatic Menu
- (1998) Very Best September Love (Ippu-Do/Masami Tsuchiya)
- (2006) Magic Vox: Ippu-Do Era 1979-1984 (7-CD box set with DVD, includes Tsuchiya and Mitake solo releases)
- (2010) Essence – The Very Best Of Ippu-Do
