= Arena (Duran Duran album) =

Live album by Duran Duran
- Released: 12 November 1984
- Recorded: "Around the world 1984"
- Genres: New wave; pop rock
- Length: 47:54
- Label: Parlophone
- Producers: Duran Duran; Nile Rodgers

Duran Duran chronology
Seven and the Ragged Tiger (1983)	Arena (1984)	Notorious (1986)

Singles from Arena
- 1. "The Wild Boys" Released: 18 October 1984

Arena is a live album by the English pop rock band Duran Duran, released on 12 November 1984 through Parlophone. In 2004, the album was reissued on CD in remastered form with two bonus tracks.

Arena was Duran Duran's first live album, released at the peak of their commercial success in late 1984. It included one new song, the studio recorded "The Wild Boys", which as a single was a worldwide hit, reaching no. 2 in both the UK and the US.

Arena was released together with a number of corresponding releases, including the conceptual concert film Arena (An Absurd Notion), a documentary tour book and a board game. An edited version of the film with just the live performances, As the Lights Go Down, was also released. Arena marked the last album release featuring the complete original five-piece line-up of the band until the 2004 album Astronaut.

== Critical reception ==
Professional ratings
Review scores
Source	Rating
AllMusic	2/5 stars
The Encyclopedia of Popular Music	2/5 stars
Rolling Stone	2/5 stars
The Rolling Stone Album Guide	2/5 stars
Smash Hits	7/10
Spin Alternative Record Guide	2/10

Upon its release, Smash Hits reviewer Dave Rimmer criticised the album for its lack of "any kind of live feeling", but still gave it a 7 out 10 rating for its "competent" content.

== Track listing ==
All tracks are written by Duran Duran.

Side one
No.	Title	Length
1.	"Is There Something I Should Know?"	4:34
2.	"Hungry Like the Wolf"	4:01
3.	"New Religion"	5:37
4.	"Save a Prayer"	6:12
5.	"The Wild Boys" (New Studio Track)	4:18

Side two
No.	Title	Length
6.	"The Seventh Stranger"	5:05
7.	"The Chauffeur"	5:23
8.	"Union of the Snake"	4:09
9.	"Planet Earth"	4:31
10.	"Careless Memories"	4:07

2004 remastered CD bonus tracks
No.	Title	Length
11.	"Girls on Film"	5:59
12.	"Rio"	5:55

== Personnel ==
Credits adapted from the liner notes of Arena.

=== Duran Duran ===
- Simon Le Bon - lead vocals, ocarina on "The Chauffeur"
- Nick Rhodes - keyboards, synthesizers, sound effects, backing vocals
- Andy Taylor - guitars, backing vocals
- Roger Taylor - drums, percussion
- John Taylor - bass guitar, backing vocals

=== Additional musicians ===
- Andy Hamilton
- Raphael DeJesus
- B.J. Nelson
- Charmaine Burch

=== Technical ===
- George Tukto – engineering (tracks 1–4, 6–10)
- Jason Corsaro – engineering (all tracks); mixing (tracks 1–4, 6–10)
- Duran Duran – production (tracks 1–4, 6–10)
- Nile Rodgers – production (track 5)

=== Artwork ===
- Assorted Images – sleeve production
- Mike Owen – outer photography

== Charts ==
=== Weekly charts ===
Weekly chart performance for Arena
Chart (1984–1985)	Peak position
Australian Albums (Kent Music Report)	8
Austrian Albums (Ö3 Austria)	7
Canada Top Albums/CDs (RPM)	10
Dutch Albums (Album Top 100)	5
European Albums (Music & Media)	1
Finnish Albums (Suomen virallinen lista)	8
German Albums (Offizielle Top 100)	1
Italian Albums (Musica e dischi)	1
New Zealand Albums (RMNZ)	3
Norwegian Albums (VG-lista)	16
Swedish Albums (Sverigetopplistan)	16
Swiss Albums (Schweizer Hitparade)	4
UK Albums (Official Charts)	6
US Billboard 200	4

=== Year-end charts ===
1984 year-end chart performance for Arena
Chart (1984)	Position
Canada Top Albums/CDs (RPM)	75
Dutch Albums (Album Top 100)	63
UK Albums (Gallup)	31

1985 year-end chart performance for Arena
Chart (1985)	Position
Canada Top Albums/CDs (RPM)	72
Dutch Albums (Album Top 100)	33
German Albums (Offizielle Top 100)	25
New Zealand Albums (RMNZ)	32
UK Albums (Gallup)	73
US Billboard 200	61

== Certifications and sales ==
Certifications and sales for Arena
Region	Certification	Certified units/sales
Argentina (CAPIF)	Platinum	60,000
Canada (Music Canada)	2× Platinum	200,000^{^}
Germany (BVMI)	Gold	250,000^{^}
Netherlands (NVPI)	Gold	50,000^{^}
New Zealand (RMNZ)	Platinum	15,000^{^}
Spain (Promusicae)	Gold	50,000^{^}
United Kingdom (BPI)	Platinum	300,000^{^}
United States (RIAA)	2× Platinum	2,000,000^{^}
^{^} Shipments figures based on certification alone.
