= The Devils (band) =

English electronic pop band

The Devils is the name of an English electronic pop band, formed by Nick Rhodes and Stephen Duffy.

The first incarnation of Duran Duran in 1978 included Rhodes as keyboardist, John Taylor on guitar and Duffy as songwriter/vocalist and bassist (along with Simon Colley). This line-up performed live for almost a year before Duffy and Colley left the band.

Duffy moved on to a solo career and the Lilac Time, and Duran Duran eventually went on to fame with drummer Roger Taylor, guitarist Andy Taylor and singer Simon Le Bon.

In 1999, Duffy came across an old tape recording of a live Duran Duran concert from a 1979 show. Shortly afterwards, Rhodes and Duffy met by chance at a fashion show, and began talking about the old music. They decided it might be fun to re-record some of those original, dark, art-school, pre-Le Bon Duran Duran songs – including "Big Store" which was set in the department store Rackhams and a song eulogising the nightclub Barbarella's.

A few months later they took to the studio, using vintage analog instruments but modern production techniques to recreate the early Duran Duran sound. The lyrics remained unchanged.

== Dark Circles ==
Dark Circles

Studio album by the Devils
- Released: 15 July 2002 (UK); 6 May 2003 (U.S.)
- Recorded: 2001, 2002
- Genre: Electronic
- Label: Tape Modern
- Producer: Andy Strange; Nick Rhodes; Stephen Duffy

Professional ratings
Review scores
Source	Rating
AllMusic	link
PopMatters	(positive) link
musicOMH	(positive) link

The band played live only two times, in London (19 November 2002), and Cologne (17 February 2003), before both members returned to their normal careers.

In early June 2008, Rhodes and Duffy were interviewed by the music journalist Pete Paphides for BBC Radio 4, and relived the whole Dark Circles experience. Duffy also publicly stated through his website that a Devils DVD could be released later.

== Track listing ==
=== CD: TPCD001 (UK, US) ===
1. "Memory Palaces" – 2:27
2. "Big Store" – 5:50
3. "Dark Circles" – 3:09
4. "Signals in Smoke" – 4:03
5. "Come Alive" – 4:10
6. "Hawks Do Not Share" – 4:51
7. "Newhaven-Dieppe" – 3:36
8. "World Exclusive" – 3:28
9. "Aztec Moon" – 4:26
10. "Lost Decade" – 4:09
11. "Barbarellas" – 4:49
12. "The Tinsel Ritual" – 3:14

=== CD: CTCR-18062 (Japan, Avex Inc.) ===
1. "Memory Palaces"
2. "Big Store"
3. "Dark Circles"
4. "Signals in Smoke"
5. "Come Alive"
6. "Hawks Do Not Share"
7. "Newhaven-Dieppe"
8. "World Exclusive"
9. "Aztec Moon"
10. "Lost Decade"
11. "Barbarellas"
12. "The Tinsel Ritual"
13. "Come Alive (Tiga Swear Lies Remix)" (bonus track) – 6:14

Track 13 also appeared on Headman Dance Modern, Eskimo Records, Belgium (CD 541416 501230, 2xLP 541416 501231, released 2004).

=== CD: TPCD7 (UK, 2004 reissue) ===
1. "Memory Palaces"
2. "Big Store"
3. "Dark Circles"
4. "Signals in Smoke"
5. "Come Alive"
6. "Hawks Do Not Share"
7. "Newhaven-Dieppe"
8. "World Exclusive"
9. "Aztec Moon"
10. "Lost Decade"
11. "Barbarellas"
12. "The Tinsel Ritual"

== Promotional releases ==
- "Dark Circles" (UK radio promo, 1 track only. Ld promotions, cd acetate)
- "Dark Circles" (UK album promo with Dark Circles, Big Store, Come Alive, Newhaven-Dieppe. Ld promotions)
- "Dark Circles" (UK album promo, 12 tracks, Universal BC3606)

== Promo videos ==
- "The Devils EPK" – produced by Stephen Duffy, edited by Gary Oldknow, graphics by Andrew Day
- "Dark Circles" (track) – directed and produced by Gary Oldknow
- "Hawks Don't Share" – directed by Nick Rhodes, produced by Gary Oldknow
- "Big Store" – produced by Gary Oldknow

== Personnel ==
- Nick Rhodes – keyboards and synthesizer
- Stephen Duffy – vocals, guitar, bass, keyboards & synthesizer
- Mark Tinley – additional programming, amorphic resonances
- Ben Georgiades – drums, loops and assistance
- Sally Boyden – vocals (tracks 2, 3, 8, 10 & 11)
- Evie – vocals (tracks 2, 3 & 8)

Also credited:

- Engineered by Andy Strange assisted by Adam Noble at Air Studios, London
- Mastered by Tony Cousins at Metropolis
- Art & design: Andrew Day
- Photograph of The Devils: Retts Wood
- Make up: Paola Recabarren
