= Only After Dark (album) =

Compilation album by John Taylor and Nick Rhodes
- Released: 8 May 2006
- Genre: Glam, punk, electronica
- Label: EMI
- Producer: Various
- Compiler: Nick Rhodes and John Taylor

"Only After Dark" is a compilation album that was compiled by Nick Rhodes and John Taylor from Duran Duran, and recreates a night at Birmingham's Rum Runner nightclub, during the post punk days of the late 70s/early 80s when a new sound of glam/punk/electronica started to crystallize. The CD captures some of the discs that Nick spun when he was deejaying for £10 a night at the club and Duran Duran were the resident band. The inspiration for it came when in 2000 John and Nick spent hours selecting 58 tracks for a 4-hour Internet radio broadcast entitled "A Night At The Rum Runner". The broadcast was created and mixed by DJOktober and played on the streaming platform Live365 from December, 2000 through February, 2001; and again from June, 2001 through September, 2002. The 18 track CD was released on 8 May 2006 and presented in a silver gatefold card sleeve in shocking pink metallic print featuring photographs taken from this period, first published in the book "Duran Duran Unseen" by Paul Edmond, the front cover photo being of fashion designer Patti Bell.

== Track listing ==
1. "Being Boiled" – The Human League
2. "Computer Game" – Yellow Magic Orchestra
3. "Always Crashing in the Same Car" – David Bowie
4. "Sister Europe" – Psychedelic Furs
5. "Changeling" – Simple Minds
6. "Only After Dark" – Mick Ronson
7. "Underpass" – John Foxx
8. "Warm Leatherette" – The Normal
9. "The 'In' Crowd" – Bryan Ferry
10. "The True Wheel" – Brian Eno
11. "Are 'Friends' Electric?" – Tubeway Army
12. "Robots" – Kraftwerk
13. "I Feel Love" – Donna Summer
14. "I Am the Fly "- Wire
15. "Shot by Both Sides" – Magazine
16. "Private Life" – Grace Jones
17. "Passenger" – Iggy Pop
18. "Slow Motion"- Ultravox
