= Playing for Keeps (1986 film) =

1986 film directed by Harvey and Bob Weinstein

- Theatrical release poster
- Directed by: Bob Weinstein; Harvey Weinstein
- Written by: Bob Weinstein; Harvey Weinstein; Jeremy Leven
- Produced by: Alan Brewer; Bob Weinstein; Harvey Weinstein
- Starring: Daniel Jordano; Matthew Penn; Leon W. Grant; Mary B. Ward; Jimmy Baio; Harold Gould; Marisa Tomei
- Cinematography: Eric Van Haren Noman
- Edited by: Gary Karr; Sharyn L. Ross
- Music by: George Acogny; Daniel Bechet
- Production company: Miramax Films
- Distributed by: Universal Pictures
- Release date: October 3, 1986
- Running time: 102 minutes
- Country: United States
- Language: English
- Budget: $5 million
- Box office: $2.669 million

Playing for Keeps is a 1986 American comedy film written and directed by brothers Bob and Harvey Weinstein. It stars Daniel Jordano, Matthew Penn and Leon W. Grant as a trio of inner-city teenagers attempting to strike it rich by turning a hotel into a rock 'n' roll resort. A then little-known Marisa Tomei has a supporting role.

== Plot ==
18-year-old Danny d'Angelo, an alumnus of Benjamin Franklin High School in New York City, lives in an apartment with his mother and a charitable sister named Marie. One day in July, he discovers they have inherited the Hotel Majestic, a long-closed facility in Bethany, Pennsylvania — and along with it, $8,000 in unpaid taxes (equal to $23,497 today). Danny's great-aunt Theresa once owned the place, but died before she could pay them off. Unknown to them, a firm called Pritchard Chemicals is willing to acquire the property for its Fox River project, and turn it into a chemical waste dump.

Danny discusses the scenario with two friends: a would-be entertainer named Silk Davis, and an athletic type named Spikes McClanahan. To earn enough money for keeping the Majestic, Danny attempts to borrow funds from a bank, while Silk and Spikes become suburban salespeople—but to no avail. Afterward, the three disguise themselves as members of the Boy Scouts, and successfully sell a lot of mint cookies to office workers.

Danny eventually makes Marie proud, not only with his earnings, but with a bundle of food supplies for a few needy neighbors. Soon, he and his friends travel to Hawley on a decorated van, but the worn-down state of the Majestic catches them off-guard. Rockefeller G. Harding, a residing hermit, gives them a tour that leaves the newcomers more appalled. They begin to renovate the building and transform it into "The New Hotel Majestic...For Kids Only", promising "MTV in every room" once it re-opens. But several of the townsfolk express their displeasure over what could happen to their town, and even take measures to keep Danny and friends out of their lives. The challenge is magnified by a local politician who is in the pocket of a chemical company that hopes to turn the hotel into a toxic dump site. He rallies townspeople to oppose the restoration, and to harass the kids.

Meanwhile, Rockefeller suggests that Danny recruit stockholders to manage the hotel. In doing so, Danny scouts the New York streets and hires many of his friends for that purpose. Arriving in Hawley, the stockholders of Majestic Enterprises are as dismayed as Danny, Spikes and Silk previously were; the luxury they expected of the Majestic is nowhere in sight. Instead, they are put to the task of fixing up the place within a month, after which inspection will take place.

Overhearing details of the chemical company's plans, they discredit the local politician who had been giving them grief, after which they complete their restoration and open the hotel.

== Cast ==
- Daniel Jordano as Danny D'Angelo
- Matthew Penn as "Spikes" McClanahan
- Leon W. Grant as "Silk" Davis
- Mary B. Ward as Chloe Hatcher
- Marisa Tomei as Tracy
- Jimmy Baio as Steinberg
- Harold Gould as Robert Kennica / Rockefeller G. Harding
- Kim Hauser as Marie
- William Newman as Joshua
- Robert Milli as Henry Cromwell
- John Randolph Jones as Sheriff Billy Sullivan
- Raymond J. Barry Mr. Hatcher, Chloe's Father
- Hildy Brooks as Danny's Mom
- Timothy Carhart as Emmett
- Philip Kraus as Art Lewis
- David Lipman as Bank Buddy

== Stockholders ==
- Bruce Kluger as Gene Epstein
- Anthony Marciona as Ronnie Long
- Glen Robert Robillard as Joel
- Frank Scasso as Van Go Go
- Lisa Schultz as Jill
- Doug Warhit as Larry Diamond

== Production ==
Playing for Keeps was inspired by the boyhood experiences of Harvey and Bob Weinstein, the founders of independent distributor Miramax Films; they served as its directors, co-writers and co-producers. It was partly based on Harvey's stint at the Century Theater in Buffalo, New York; in 1974, he purchased the facility with a friend named Horace "Corky" Burger, and ran it as a rock and roll venue until its 1978 demolition. Playing for Keeps was the Weinsteins' first effort as directors; (Note: In 2004, Harvey Weinstein tried his hand at directing once again; his planned project never materialized.) their mother Miriam is mentioned in the "special thanks" section of the credits. The film was shot in New York City, along with several locations in Pennsylvania: Scranton, Bethany, Honesdale and Hawley. At one point in production, the brothers lacked money to continue it, and had to depend on their partner Frank McGuire to supply financing.

== Soundtrack ==
The film's soundtrack, released by Atlantic Records in 1986, features music by a decidedly higher-profile roster: Phil Collins, Peter Frampton, Pete Townshend, and Duran Duran splinter group Arcadia. A music video for one of the tracks, Sister Sledge's "Here to Stay", was produced by Alan Brewer (the film's musical director), and directed by Harvey Weinstein and NFL Films' Phil Tuckett. Players from the Chicago Bears football team appeared in the video along with the band. "Think We're Gonna Make It" was written by Brewer and keyboardist Rick Wakeman.

Several of the tracks in addition to "Here to Stay" were released as singles and/or became well known. Pete Townshend's opening track, "Life to Life" reached number 39 on the Mainstream Rock charts. Chris Thompson's "It's Not Over" appeared later the same year, with a slightly longer fade-out, on Thompson's High Cost of Living album and was also released as a single. The tune would be covered by Starship the following year, becoming a top-ten hit for the group in the States. Music videos were also created for Arcadia's "Say the Word" and Julian Lennon's live take on "Stand by Me." Though not officially released as a single, Phil Collins' "We Said Hello, Goodbye" (which is actually a remixed version of a B-side for two of Collins' singles from No Jacket Required) received significant radio airplay at the time and became one of his more recognizable tunes. This remixed version is rarely heard today, while the original B-side version is sometimes heard on radio stations with "variety" formats.

Track listing

1. "Life to Life" - Pete Townshend
2. "It's Not Over" - Chris Thompson
3. "Distant Drums" - Peter Frampton
4. "It's Gettin' Hot" - Eugene Wilde
5. "Think We're Gonna Make It" - Hinton Battle
6. "We Said Hello, Goodbye (Don't Look Back)" - Phil Collins (The mix of this version of the song is different than the version that appears on the CD version of Phil Collins' album No Jacket Required.)
7. "Here to Stay" - Sister Sledge
8. "Say the Word" - Arcadia
9. "Make a Wish" - Joe Cruz
10. "Stand by Me" - Julian Lennon

== Release ==
Playing for Keeps was made at a time when much of Miramax's output consisted of arthouse, foreign and documentary fare. It was produced by Miramax, and acquired by Universal Pictures for North American distribution. The MTV cable network aired a 22-minute making-of documentary, Playing for Keeps: The Team Behind a Dream, as part of the promotional efforts. Opening on October 3, 1986, the film made US$1.4 million from 1,148 theaters during opening weekend, and went on to earn US$2.663 million domestically.

== Home media ==
It was released on VHS in July 1987, and on Region 1 DVD in August 2003.

== Reception ==
Playing for Keeps did not fare well among critics. Patrick Golstein of the Los Angeles Times criticized many of its writing and technical aspects in his review, and deemed it "a hapless, dimwitted film which—like Flashdance and dozens of other feeble imitations—follows the dreary adventures of a band of teens fighting to achieve a cherished dream." Caryn James of The New York Times wrote, "[The film] is so low-budget innocuous that it resembles a below-average episode of the television series Fame. It probably should have bypassed theaters altogether and gone directly to videotape or television, where its staleness might have been less conspicuous." The Pittsburgh Post-Gazette's Marylynn Uricchio concurred with James: "While never exactly boring, Playing for Keeps is painful and mindless viewing nonetheless." Bill Kaufman of Newsday found the soundtrack "noisy, if nothing else." Dave Kehr of the Chicago Tribune gave it one star out of four.

== See also ==
- List of American films of 1986
