= Masami Tsuchiya (singer) =

Japanese musician (born 1952)

- Born: August 22, 1952 (age 73); Fuji, Shizuoka, Japan
- Genres: Avant-garde, pop, rock
- Occupations: Musician, songwriter, record producer
- Instruments: Vocals, guitar
- Years active: 1969–present
- Labels: Epic/Sony, Polydor K.K., Mazzy Bunny
- Formerly of: Ippu-Do
- Website: Official website

Masami Tsuchiya (Japanese: 土屋 昌巳, Hepburn: Tsuchiya Masami) is a Japanese singer-songwriter, guitarist, and record producer. He rose to prominence in the late 1970s as lead vocalist and guitarist of the rock band Ippu-Do. Following their disbandment in 1984, Tsuchiya focused on his solo career and formed several short-lived bands with well-known musicians. He has also participated in various collaborations and produced recordings for acts such as Glay, Blankey Jet City, and The Willard.

== Early life and musical beginnings ==
Masami Tsuchiya grew up in a strict household in Japan, where rock music was discouraged and seen as a form of rebellion. Despite this, he developed a deep, inner urge to express himself through music, often in secret. His fascination began during elementary and junior high school, when he first heard The Beatles—a moment he describes as a cultural revelation. “It wasn’t just their rock’n’roll sound—it was something more. It was the way they harmonized, the way they layered their vocals in such an intricate, beautiful way,” Tsuchiya recalled in an interview with Visual Music Japan (VMJ), conducted by Mandah Frénot. Drawn first to the emotional complexity of the Beatles and later to the raw energy of The Rolling Stones, he soon immersed himself in the world of guitar icons like Eric Clapton, Jeff Beck, Jimmy Page, and Jimi Hendrix. By high school, Tsuchiya was deeply influenced by the sound, spirit, and cultural impact of Western rock, laying the foundation for his distinct and genre-blending musical identity.

== Career ==
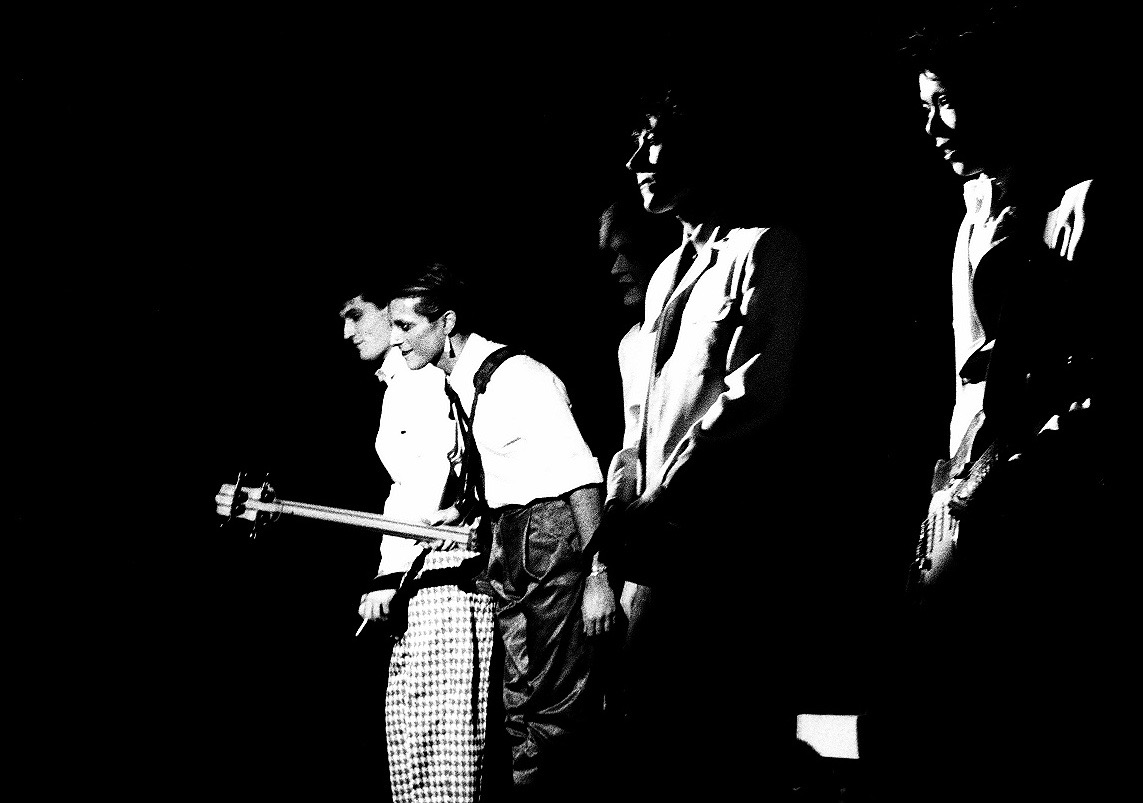
Tsuchiya (far right) performing with Japan in 1982

Tsuchiya's career in music started with a brief stint aged 17 in 1969 as a roadie and stand-in guitarist with The Golden Cups. However, it was discovered that he had lied about his age when his family tracked him down so he was forced to leave the band.

In 1972, Tsuchiya was recruited by Nobu Saito to work as a session guitarist, going on to record and tour with Lily and the Bye Bye session band (one of the other members was Ryuichi Sakamoto) and became a regular member of Junko Ohashi and Minoya Central Station, leaving in 1978 with the formation of Ippu-Do. Since 1982, Tsuchiya has worked with artists as diverse as English new wave rockers Japan and Bill Nelson, Japanese electronica composer Ryuichi Sakamoto, Duran Duran side-project Arcadia, and Japanese rock singer Atsushi Sakurai.

In 2001, Tsuchiya formed the short-lived group The d.e.p with Vivian Hsu, Mick Karn, Masahide Sakuma and Gota Yashiki (both formerly of the Plastics). They released the album Shinkei Stop that year.

In March 2008, Tsuchiya formed another short-lived rock band, Vitamin-Q with Yashiki, Kazuhiko Katō, Rei Ohara and Anza. It ended after Kato's suicide on October 17, 2009.

In June 2010, following news of former collaborator Mick Karn's cancer diagnosis, Tsuchiya reunited with The d.e.p and recorded two songs for a proposed September 2010 release to raise funds for Karn and his family.

In early 2013, Tsuchiya formed the supergroup KA.F.KA with Issay (Der Zibet), KenKen (Rize), Motokatsu Miyagami (The Mad Capsule Markets), and Ken Morioka (Soft Ballet). Koji Ueno (Thee Michelle Gun Elephant) later replaced KenKen on bass. Tsuchiya's record label, Mazzy Bunny Records, released Swan Dive in November 2013, his first solo album in 15 years.

== Discography ==
=== Solo ===
- Rice Music (1982)
- Alone (1983) - book with flex disc records
- Tokyo Ballet (1985)
- Life In Mirrors (1986)
- Horizon (1988)
- Time Passenger (1989)
- Forest People (1998)
- Swan Dive (2013)
- Privacy (2019) - book with CD soundtrack

=== Compilation albums ===
- Very Best ~ Sumire September Love (1998)
- Essence: The Best of Masami Tsuchiya (2010)

=== Compilation contributions ===
- Life in Tokyo - A Tribute to Japan (1996) - "Visions of China"
- Q: Are We Anarchist? (1999) - "Kaikaku Kodomo (Revolution Kids)"
- Parade -Respective Tracks of Buck-Tick- (2005) - "Mienai Mono o Miyo to Suru Gokai Subete Gokai da"
- Luna Sea Memorial Cover Album -Re:birth- (2007) - "Moon"
- Hateshinaki Glam Rock Kayō no Sekai (2011) - "Hana no Kubikazari"

=== Other work ===
- Lily, Taeko (1974) - guitars
- Lily, Lily Live (1974) - guitars
- Lily, Love Letter (1975) - guitars
- Lily, Auroila (1976) - guitars
- Ryuichi Sakamoto, Left Handed Dream (1981) - backing vocals
- Kim Wilde, Select (1982) - composer of "Bitter Is Better"
- Japan, Oil on Canvas (1983) - guitar and keyboards
- Arcadia, So Red the Rose (1985) - guitars, violin
- David Sylvian, Alchemy: An Index of Possibilities (1985) - "guitar abstractions" on "Steel Cathedrals"
- Glay, Speed Pop (1995) - electric guitar and co-arrangement on "Manatsu no Tobira" and "Life ~Tōi Sora no Shita de~"
- Dr. Jan Guru, Planet Japan (2004) - guitar
- Atsushi Sakurai, Ai no Wakusei (2004) - composer of and guitar on "Shingetsu"
- Mika Nakashima, The End (2006) - arranged "Neglest Mind"
- The Yellow Monkey, 9999 (2019) - co-arranged "Kono Koi no Kakera" and "Kegawa no Kōto no Blues"
