= Arcadia (band) =

British pop band, side project of Duran Duran

- Origin: United Kingdom
- Genres: Pop; art rock; synth-pop
- Years active: 1985–1986
- Labels: Capitol; Parlophone; Atlantic
- Spinoff of: Duran Duran
- Past members: Simon Le Bon; Nick Rhodes; Roger Taylor

Arcadia were a British pop group formed in 1985 by Simon Le Bon, Nick Rhodes, and Roger Taylor of Duran Duran as a side project during a break in the band's schedule. The project was active only during 1985 and 1986 and for just one album, So Red the Rose, which was certified Platinum in the United States and included the singles "Election Day", "Goodbye Is Forever", "The Flame", and "The Promise" (featuring David Gilmour and Sting). Drummer Roger Taylor appeared in only a few band photographs and one music video ("Election Day"), and stated he was to be involved only in the recording side of the project (he also had minor involvement in the Power Station, the other Duran Duran splinter group, formed by Duran Duran's Andy and John Taylor alongside Robert Palmer and Tony Thompson of Chic).

== Music career ==
=== So Red the Rose (1985) ===
The group recorded just one album, the platinum-selling So Red the Rose. It peaked at No. 30 in the UK and No. 23 in the US, and featured the UK/US Top 10 single "Election Day", as well as the top 40 hits "The Promise" and "Goodbye Is Forever". It also contains the single "The Flame" and the promo-singles "Missing", "El Diablo" and "Keep Me in the Dark".

Simon Le Bon described So Red the Rose as "the most pretentious album ever made", while AllMusic called it "the best album Duran Duran never made". Musicians who contributed to the album included guitarists David Gilmour (Pink Floyd) and Carlos Alomar, pianist Herbie Hancock, Sting (who provided backing vocals on "The Promise"), Grace Jones (who provided the spoken-word intro/interlude on "The Flame" and "Election Day"), bass player Mark Egan of the Pat Metheny Group (whose distinctive fretless sound can be recognised in "The Promise", "El Diablo" and "Lady Ice"), Masami Tsuchiya and David Van Tieghem, a percussionist from New York.

A video collection was also released which featured music videos for the singles directed by Roger Christian, Marcelo Anciano, Russell Mulcahy and Dean Chamberlain. The band also recorded and released the stand-alone single "Say the Word" for the Playing for Keeps movie soundtrack, which was not included on So Red the Rose.

EMI re-released the album as a three-disc box set in April 2010. This remastering collected all permutations and remixes of tracks released by the band. The third disc comprised the video collection on DVD, but it does not include the video for "Say the Word".

=== Band changes ===
Arcadia continued the Duran Duran tradition of a slick image. For Arcadia's visual style, Le Bon, Rhodes and Roger Taylor wore formal attire, including black tuxedos, vintage suits, and bow ties. The three also dyed their hair black, as seen when they performed (as Duran Duran, with Andy and John Taylor) at the 1985 Live Aid concert in Philadelphia. By the time the video for their single "The Flame" was made in early 1986 (in which John Taylor made a cameo), Rhodes had changed his hair colour to golden blond and Le Bon had returned to his regular highlighted hairstyle.

=== Other appearances ===
The group made a variety of promotional appearances on television, but never toured. When Duran Duran released their Notorious album and toured, "Election Day" was included as part of the set along with "Some Like It Hot" from the Power Station. Drummer Roger Taylor retired from the music business for 15 years after the release of the Arcadia album, but returned in 2001 to rejoin the most famous classic Duran Duran lineup.

== Band members ==
- Simon Le Bon – vocals (1985–1986)
- Nick Rhodes – keyboards (1985–1986)
- Roger Taylor – drums (1985-1986) (officially left the band in April 1986 with his leave from Duran Duran)

== Guest musicians ==
- Carlos Alomar – guitar
- Pierre Defaye – violin
- Rafael De Jesus – percussion
- Jean-Claude Dubois – harp
- Mark Egan – bass on "The Promise", "El Diablo" and "Lady Ice"
- David Gilmour – guitar on "The Promise" and "Missing"
- Herbie Hancock – piano
- Steve Jordan – percussion
- Grace Jones – voice on "Election Day"
- Andy Mackay – saxophone
- Masami Tsuchiya – guitar & violin
- Sting – vocals on "The Promise"
- David Van Tieghem – percussion

== Discography ==
=== Studio albums ===
List of studio albums, with selected details, chart positions and certifications
Title	Details	Peak chart positions						Certifications
Title	Details	UK	US	AUS	SWE	NZ	CAN	Certifications
So Red the Rose	Released: 18 November 1985; Label: Parlophone, Capitol/EMI; Formats: LP, CS, CD	30	23	35	48	22	14	RIAA: Platinum; CRIA: 2× Platinum

=== Video albums ===
List of video albums, with selected details
Title	Details
Arcadia	Released: 1987; Distributor: Picture Music International (MVP 9911382); Formats: VHS, LD

=== Singles ===
List of singles, with selected chart positions, showing year released and album name
Title	Year	Peak chart positions									Album
Title	Year	UK	US	US Dance	AUS	NZ	NOR	NLD	SWI	IRE	Album
"Election Day"	1985	7	6	29	13	4	7	12	18	5	So Red the Rose
"Goodbye Is Forever"	1985	—	33	—	77	—	—	—	—	—	So Red the Rose
"The Promise"	1986	37	—	—	94	—	—	—	—	24	So Red the Rose
"The Flame"	1986	58	—	—	—	—	—	38	—	29	So Red the Rose
"Say the Word"	1986	—	—	—	—	—	—	—	—	—	Playing for Keeps (soundtrack)
"—" denotes a recording that did not chart or was not released in that territory.

=== Music videos ===
List of music videos, showing year released and directors
Title	Year	Director(s)
"Election Day"	1985	Roger Christian
"The Promise"	1985	Marcelo Anciano
"Goodbye Is Forever"	1986	Marcelo Anciano
"The Flame"	1986	Russell Mulcahy
"Say the Word" (theme from Playing for Keeps)	1986	—N/a
"Missing" (originally unreleased)	1986	Dean Chamberlain
