= Dean Chamberlain =

Photographer

Dean Chamberlain is a photographer who specializes in unique lighting effects and extended exposure times. Famous models for his pictures sit for up to five hours as he leaves the camera shutter open and "paints" the space around them with carried and projected lights of various colors and shapes, creating luminous and colorful images. His technique was described by one of his exhibitions as "Painting With Light Through Time and Space."

Chamberlain served as Artist in Residence at Dartmouth College in 1989. In 1994 his work appeared in Nervous Landscapes, a book which accompanied an exhibition at the Southeast Museum of Photography. He co-founded the Light Space Gallery in Venice, California in 2001, and serves as its co-director. Since 2003 Chamberlain has been a contributor to Mao Mag, an insiders' art and fashion magazine. A documentary of his work is planned for release on Ovation TV in 2010.

He has taken art photographs of people from many walks of life. A "Psychedelic Pioneers" series of limited edition prints included portraits of Timothy Leary, Ram Dass, Albert Hofmann, Laura Huxley, Alexander Shulgin, Rick Doblin, Oscar Janiger, Stan Grof, Terence McKenna, and John C. Lilly.; another series documented artists like Keith Haring and Jeff Koons. He has also created portraits for musicians such as David Bowie, Duran Duran, Debbie Harry, Paul McCartney, Madonna, Arcadia, Roy Orbison, and directed music videos using the same long exposure techniques: "This One" for Paul and Linda McCartney, "Missing" for Arcadia and "All She Wants Is" for Duran Duran. "All She Wants Is" won an MTV Video Music Award for innovation.

Chamberlain was born in Boston, Massachusetts. He first became interested in photography when he was thirteen using a Polaroid camera, and by fifteen had acquired his first Konica. He had always wanted to be an artist and was inspired by his grandmother who encouraged him to paint on canvas. He attended Sheridan College and Rochester Institute of Technology and by his early twenties he knew he was a light painter, and has focused on this technique ever since. He was very interested in the psychedelic movement, and became a friend to Timothy Leary late in his life. In 2003 his gallery put on a showing of art and memorabilia that Chamberlain selected from Leary's archives after his death.
