= Nick Rhodes =

English musician and keyboardist of Duran Duran (born 1962)

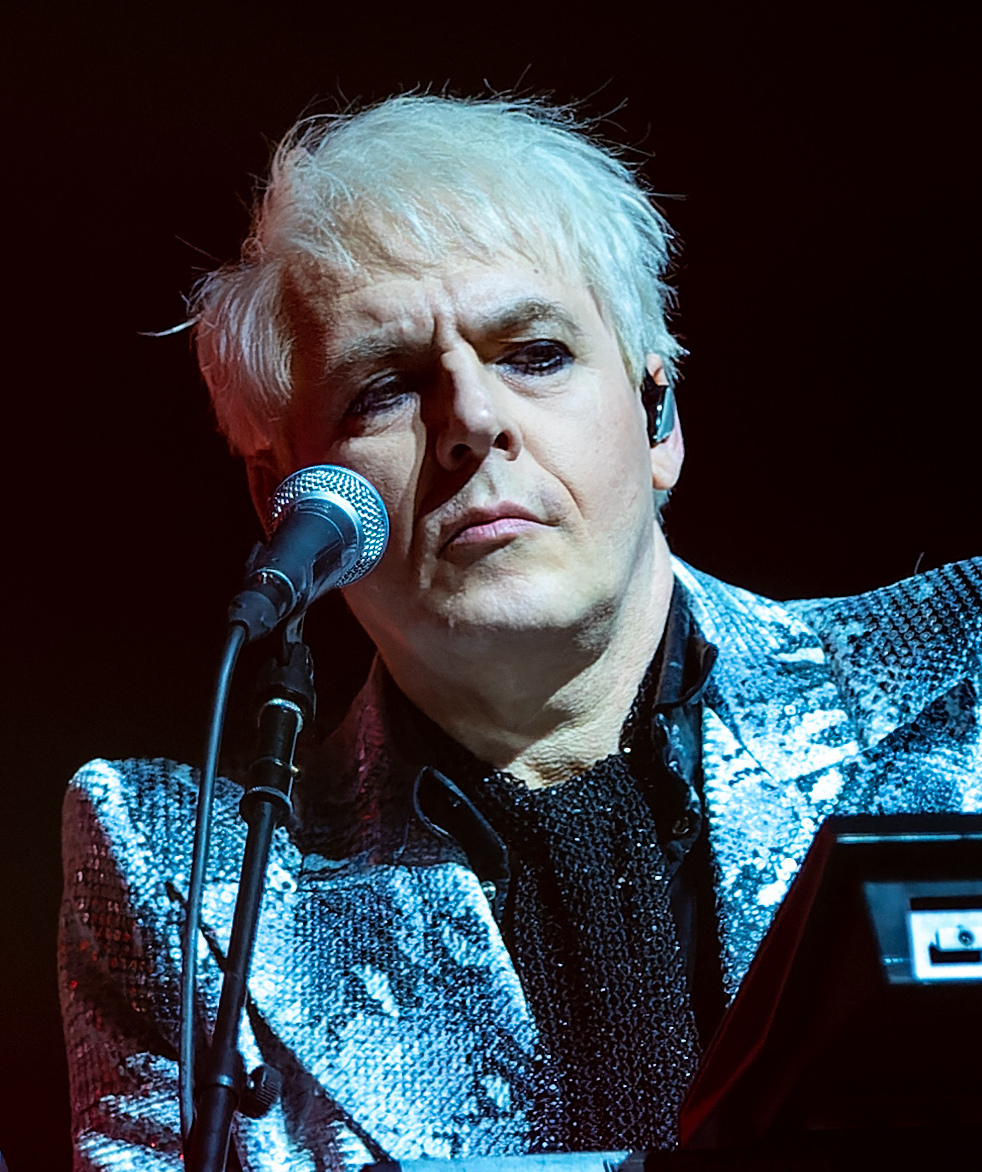
- Rhodes in 2023

Background information
- Born: Nicholas James Bates; 8 June 1962 (age 64); Birmingham, Warwickshire, England
- Genres: Pop; pop rock; synth-pop; new wave; hard rock; heavy metal
- Occupations: Musician; producer
- Instrument: Keyboards
- Years active: 1978–present
- Member of: Duran Duran
- Formerly of: Arcadia
- Spouse: Julie Anne Friedman (m. 1984; div. 1992)

Nick Rhodes (born Nicholas James Bates; 8 June 1962) is an English keyboardist and producer, best known as a founding member and the keyboardist of Duran Duran. He has also been the only constant member of the group since their inception in 1978.

Rhodes has been involved in several side projects outside of, but related to, Duran Duran: he released an album with Arcadia in 1985 (featuring Duran Duran members Le Bon and Roger Taylor), and recorded and performed as the Devils in 2002 with Stephen Duffy, longtime musical friend and the original lead singer of Duran Duran. In March 2013, he released the TV Mania side project with former Duran Duran guitarist, Warren Cuccurullo.

== Early history ==
Nicholas James Bates is the only child of affluent parents who were the owners of a Birmingham toy shop. He attended Woodrush High School in Wythall, north Worcestershire. Bates left school in 1978 at the age of sixteen, and founded Duran Duran with his childhood friend John Taylor (who then played lead guitar) and Taylor's art school friend Stephen Duffy (vocals, bass, guitar). Having considered band names such as 'RAF', 'Arabia', 'Industry' and 'Arcadia', they named their band after "Dr. Durand Durand", Milo O'Shea's character from the sci-fi film Barbarella the day after the film had been broadcast by BBC 1 on 20 October 1978. The three of them made their first recordings on a cassette tape recorder above Bates' parents' toy shop and played their first gig on 5 April 1979 at Birmingham Polytechnic, and were joined by Simon Colley (clarinet and bass) soon after. In June 1979 Duran Duran opened for the band Fashion at the Barbarella's club in Birmingham, but following the departure of Duffy and Colley reformed soon after with vocalist Andy Wickett and drummer Roger Taylor. At this point Bates' stage name was Dior Bates. After several personnel changes Duran Duran finally settled on the line-up including guitarist Andy Taylor and lead singer Simon Le Bon in May 1980 and were eventually signed to EMI.

Born Nicholas Bates, he decided to change his name for aesthetic reasons. The decision was finally made during Duran Duran's first official interview when the journalist asked his name and he made a snap decision based upon options he had been considering, he answered Nick Rhodes and never questioned it again. As the band coalesced into its final line-up in 1979–1980, Duran Duran started playing at a local Birmingham club called the Rum Runner. The club owners became the band's managers, and Rhodes began working at the club as a disc jockey.

Rhodes reportedly owns the Duran Duran name; this was mentioned in the Andy Warhol diaries. In the entry for October 5, 1986, Warhol told his diarist Pat Hackett: "One of the Taylors isn't in the group anymore but Nick owns the name so it's still Duran Duran." In 1986, Andy and Roger Taylor left the band, returning in 2001 to reunite and create the Astronaut album.

== Career ==
=== Duran Duran ===
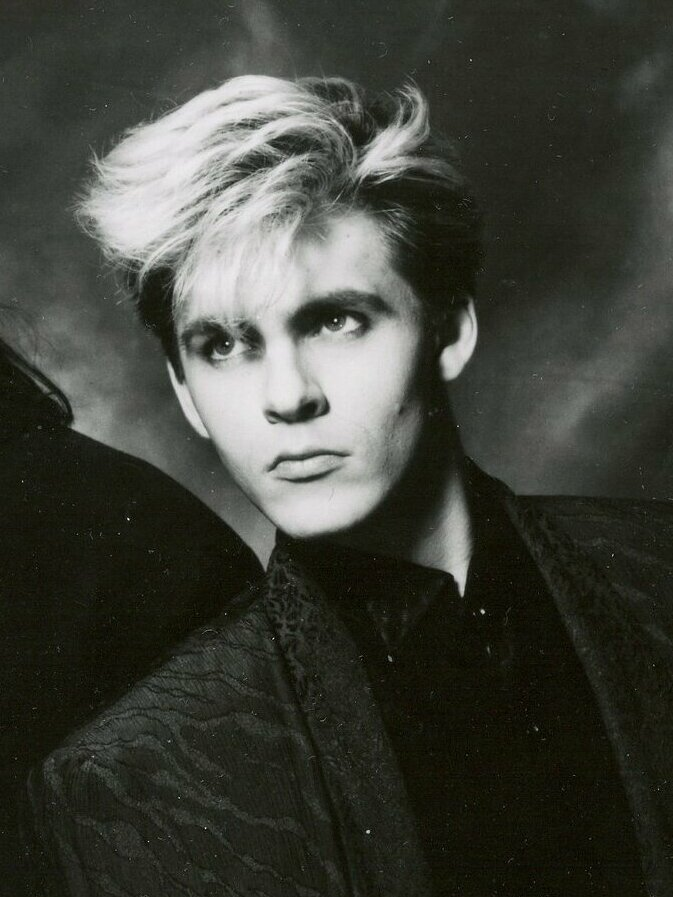
Rhodes in 1986

Emerging as one of the most successful bands of the New Romantic scene in the early 1980s, Duran Duran, of which Rhodes was a co–founding member, were innovators of the music video and a leading band in the MTV-driven Second British Invasion of the US. By 1984, the band had achieved levels of fame similar to Beatlemania. The band's first major hit was "Girls on Film" (1981), from their self-titled debut album, the popularity of which was enhanced by a controversial music video. The band's breakthrough second album was Rio (1982), a worldwide hit.

The band achieved rapid success, and Rhodes was a driving force throughout. An unschooled musician, he experimented with the sounds his analogue synthesisers were capable of, but shied away from the "novelty" sounds of some other early synth bands. The distinctive warble of "Save a Prayer", the keyboard stabs of "A View to a Kill", and the string sounds of "Come Undone" and "Ordinary World" are some of his most recognisable creations, as well as the futuristic oscillating synth that characterised Duran Duran's self-titled first album. He popularised the Crumar performer on the early records.

Rhodes was also quick to recognise the potential of the music video, and pushed the band to put more effort into their early videos than seemed warranted at the time (before the advent of MTV). Barely twenty when the band hit major stardom, he cultivated an androgynous and sometimes flamboyant image, wore heavy makeup, and changed his hair colour at whim. By the late 1990s, Rhodes had begun writing lyrics for Duran Duran, as well as music. His digitally altered voice is heard on the title track to the 1997 album Medazzaland.

According to Billboard, Duran Duran have sold over 100 million records. They achieved 30 top 40 singles in the UK singles chart (14 of them top 10) and 21 top 40 singles in the US Billboard Hot 100. The band have won numerous awards throughout their career: two Brit Awards including the 2004 award for Outstanding Contribution to Music, two Grammy Awards, an MTV Video Music Award for Lifetime Achievement and a Video Visionary Award from the MTV Europe Music Awards. They were also awarded a star on the Hollywood Walk of Fame. The band were inducted into the Rock and Roll Hall of Fame in 2022.

=== Record production ===
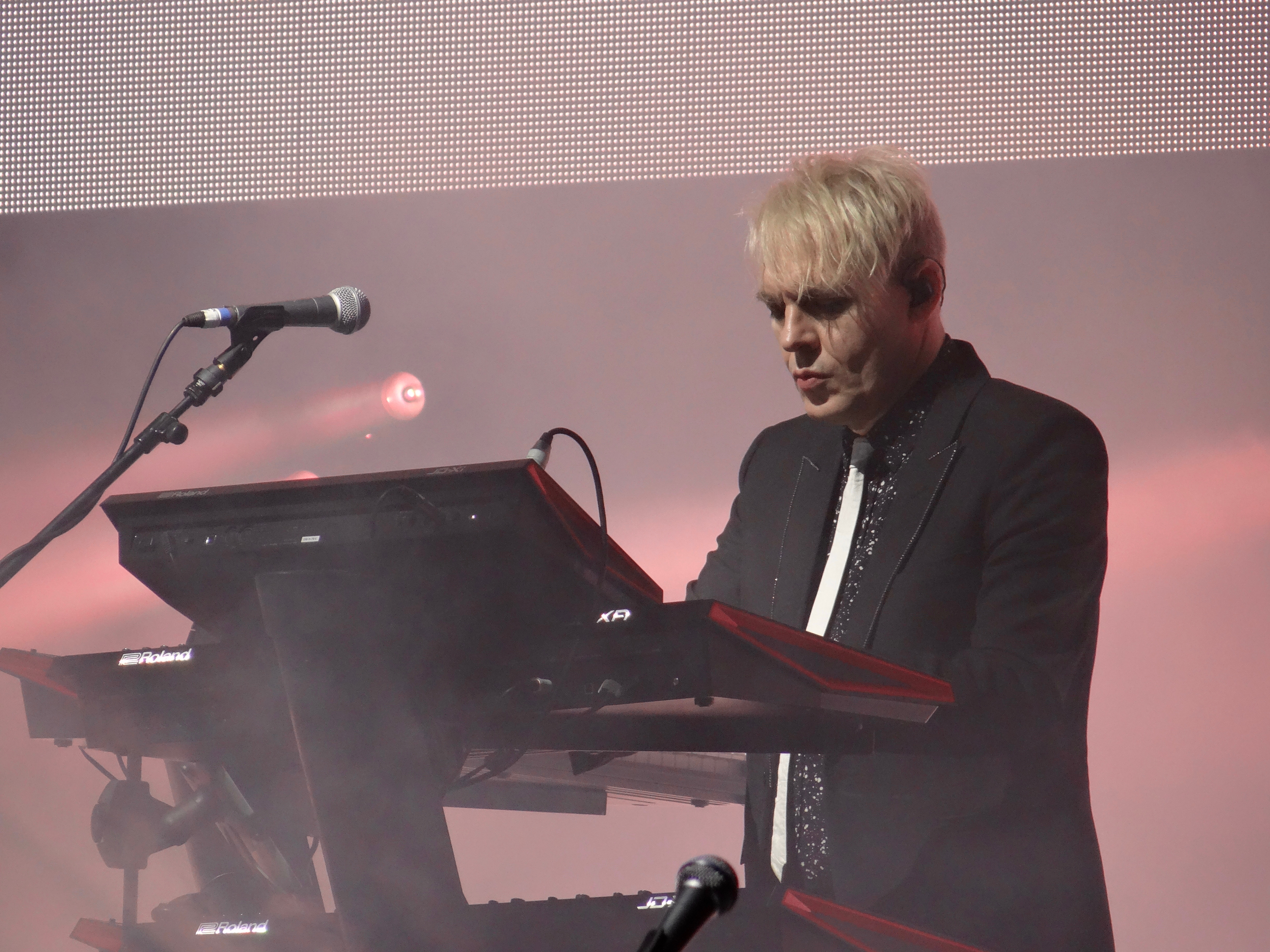
Rhodes performing on stage in 2015

Rhodes studied production techniques while in the studio with Duran Duran, eventually helping to mix several tracks on the Rio album, and was a co-producer on many of the band's later albums.

In early 1983, he discovered the band Kajagoogoo and co-produced both their debut single "Too Shy" which became a UK no. 1 (prior to any of Duran's singles reaching no. 1) and their debut album White Feathers.

Rhodes and Warren Cuccurullo wrote and produced three tracks for the Blondie reunion album in 1996; the tracks were not used, but one song called "Pop Trash Movie" was later recorded by Duran Duran for the 2000 album Pop Trash.

In 2002, Rhodes co-produced and played additional synthesizers in nine tracks of the album Welcome to the Monkey House by the Dandy Warhols. In 2004 he produced British-based pop group Riviera F for their debut EP International Lover, published on Pop Cult/Tape Modern (Rhodes' & Stephen Duffy's label).

=== Side projects ===
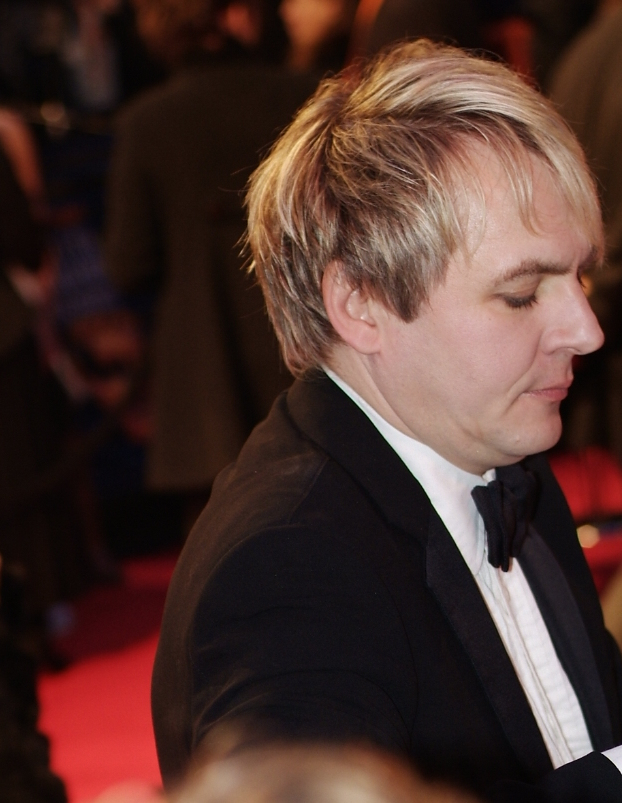
Rhodes at the 2007 BAFTA Awards

With Le Bon, Rhodes formed the side project Arcadia while Duran Duran was on hiatus in 1985. The band had a moody, keyboard-heavy sound, far more atmospheric than Duran Duran (or the hard rock of the other Duran splinter group of 1985 [John and Andy Taylor], the Power Station). The band scored a major hit with "Election Day" and the band's only album, So Red the Rose, went platinum in the US but was less successful in their native UK. The band never toured and was dissolved when Duran Duran regrouped in 1986. In 1999, Rhodes reunited with Duran Duran's original vocalist, Stephen Duffy, to create new music based on some of the earliest Duran music the two had written together. The result was the album Dark Circles, released under the name the Devils. Also in 1999, Rhodes had a small guest appearance (in voice only) as a Canadian bomber pilot in South Park: Bigger, Longer & Uncut.

In 2006 Rhodes and John Taylor collaborated on the compilation album Only After Dark. In 2011 Rhodes along with Andrew Wyatt and Mark Ronson remixed Depeche Mode's "Personal Jesus" for the British electronic band's remix compilation Remixes 2: 81–11. Also in 2011, Rhodes wrote the afterword to the award-winning '80s 7-inch vinyl cover art book Put the Needle on the Record. In March 2013, TV Mania made up of Rhodes and ex-Duran Duran guitarist Warren Cuccurullo, released Bored with Prozac and the Internet?. Throughout the 1990s, Rhodes worked on this side project with Cuccurullo. To support the launch of the project, Rhodes had an exhibition of his photography, BEI INCUBI (Beautiful Nightmares) at the Vinyl Factory in Chelsea, London on 7 March 2013. In 2021, Rhodes collaborated with Stewart Bevan's daughter Wendy Bevan on the series of Astronomia albums.

In 2022, Rhodes collaborated with Rob Crow, Roy Mayorga, Aaron Tanner, and more on a cover of the Residents' song, "Mahogany Wood".

== Personal life ==
Rhodes met Julie Anne Friedman at a yacht party while on an American tour in 1982, and they married in 1984. They have one daughter together. After a brief separation and an attempt to reconcile, they filed for divorce in 1992.

Rhodes, as a former art student, became enamoured with the art world early in his career, making friends with pop-art artist Andy Warhol and the Factory crowd, and attending exhibitions worldwide. At the end of 1984, he released his own book of abstract art photographs called Interference. Many of the photos were displayed at an exhibition at the Hamilton Gallery in London. He continues to showcase photography on occasion, including in British magazines such as Tatler and also occasionally appears at the Cannes International Film Festival.

In November 2011, Rhodes received an Honorary Doctorate of Arts degree from the University of Bedfordshire, for his services to the music industry. Rhodes appears in Burke's Peerage under his second cousin's entry for the family of Lindley-Highfield of Ballumbie Castle, being related to the Highfield family through his paternal grandmother, Irene Lavinia Bates (née Highfield).

Rhodes is a long-time vegetarian, occasionally a pescatarian.

== Discography ==
=== with Duran Duran ===
- Duran Duran (1981)
- Rio (1982)
- Seven and the Ragged Tiger (1983)
- Notorious (1986)
- Big Thing (1988)
- Liberty (1990)
- Duran Duran (1993)
- Thank You (1995)
- Medazzaland (1997)
- Pop Trash (2000)
- Astronaut (2004)
- Reportage (2006; unreleased)
- Red Carpet Massacre (2007)
- All You Need Is Now (2010)
- Paper Gods (2015)
- Future Past (2021)
- Danse Macabre (2023)

=== with Arcadia ===
- So Red the Rose (1985)

=== with the Devils ===
- Dark Circles (2002)

=== with Star Stunted II ===
- Mahogany Wood (2024)

=== with TV Mania ===
- Bored with Prozac and the Internet? (2013; recorded in 1996)

=== Compilation albums ===
- Only After Dark with John Taylor (2006)

=== Nick Rhodes and Wendy Bevan ===
- Astronomia I: The Fall of Saturn (2021)
- Astronomia II: The Rise of Lyra (2021)
- Astronomia III: Heaven and Hell in the Serpent's Tail (2021)
- Astronomia IV: The Eclipses of Algol (2021)
