= Roger Taylor (Duran Duran drummer) =

English drummer (born 1960)

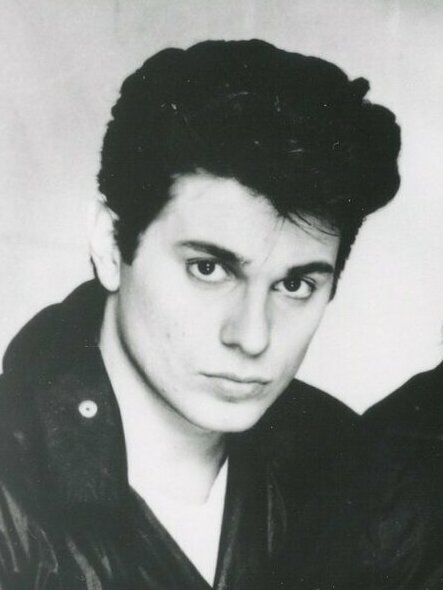
- Taylor in 1983
- Born: Roger Andrew Taylor; 26 April 1960 (age 66); Birmingham, England
- Occupation: Musician
- Years active: 1979–1986, 1994–2026
- Spouses: Giovanna Cantone (m. 1984; div. 2005); Gisella Bernales (m. 2007)
- Children: 4
- Musical career
- Genres: Pop rock; alternative rock; new wave
- Instruments: Drums; percussion
- Member of: Duran Duran
- Formerly of: Arcadia

Roger Andrew Taylor (born 26 April 1960) is an English retired musician. He was the drummer for the new wave band Duran Duran from their inception until 1985, and again from 2001 to his retirement in 2026. Duran Duran have sold over 100 million records worldwide. Taylor was inducted into the American Rock & Roll Hall of Fame in November 2022 as a member of Duran Duran.

== Life and career ==
=== Early life ===
Roger Andrew Taylor was born and brought up in the Shard End area of Birmingham until the age of 11, and then a small suburban house in Castle Bromwich (15 Hawthorne Road). His father worked in the car industry. He began drumming at around the age of 12, teaching himself by playing along with his favourite records. His first ambition was to be a goalkeeper for English football club Aston Villa, and as a child he was taken to every home match by his father. He would eventually "play" at Villa Park but as Duran Duran's drummer for their 1983 charity concert there. Taylor has cited Charlie Watts of The Rolling Stones and Paul Thompson of Roxy Music as two of his favourite drummers.

Before joining Duran Duran, Taylor performed with several school (Park Hall School in Castle Bromwich, Warwickshire) and local club bands. After being inspired by the punk bands playing at Barbarellas club in Birmingham, he formed the new wave/punk outfit Scent Organs, who became regional finalists in the Melody Maker young band of the year in 1978, and was briefly a member of post-punk band Cult Figures. After Scent Organs split in 1979, he joined Duran Duran. He became known as 'the quiet one' and has said that he has always preferred to speak through his drums.

=== 1979–1986: Duran Duran ===
Taylor became an international star with the other members of Duran Duran as they rose to fame in the early 1980s. The video for the debut single Planet Earth opens with a shot of a reclining, bare-chested Taylor looking slowly up to the sky. He played drums on the band's first three studio albums (Duran Duran, Rio, and Seven and the Ragged Tiger) and the live album Arena. In 1985, the band recorded the theme to the James Bond film A View to a Kill, which became their second US No. 1 hit and the only Bond theme to date to reach No. 1 there. However, the intense schedule of recording and touring, coupled with the pressures of fame, left Taylor unhappy with being in the band. His final performance with the original line-up of Duran Duran was in July 1985 at the Live Aid benefit concert in Philadelphia, which reached a global audience of 2 billion people. Taylor and the band had each picked up two Grammy awards during this period.

Prior to leaving the band, he worked with Duran Duran bandmates Simon Le Bon and Nick Rhodes on the album So Red the Rose for their side project Arcadia in 1985. The album featured Sting, David Gilmour, Herbie Hancock and Grace Jones. Taylor also contributed percussion to the other Duran Duran splinter group the Power Station's song "Some Like It Hot" from their self-titled album. He then purchased a remote farm estate in the hills of Gloucestershire to live a quiet life away from the music world. The Sun newspaper tracked him down and devoted a whole page to his departure, dubbing him 'the hermit of pop'. Initially his hiatus was expected to be for a year, but in 1986 the remaining members of the band issued a statement saying that he was leaving Duran Duran.

=== 1994 and 2001–present: Second tenure in Duran Duran ===
In 1994, while visiting a friend in Paris, he temporarily joined Duran Duran to play drums on three tracks for the covers album Thank You (although only two ended up on the album), later appearing in the video for "Perfect Day" and on the band's Top of the Pops performance of the song.

In 1997, Taylor regained his appetite for the music industry. He briefly formed the electro/dance band Freebass, which produced a single, "Love Is Like Oxygen", (a cover of a song by Sweet) on underground dance label Cleveland City Records. The record reached the top ten of the Music Week UK Dance Chart. Taylor also produced electro house tracks with Freebass member Jake Roberts under the name Funk Face. "Lost This Feeling" and "Shine" were released on Taylor's own label, Rt Music.

He rejoined Duran Duran in 2001, as all five of the Rio-era members reunited to record new material and perform as a quintet again. This culminated in five sold-out nights at Wembley Arena, playing Madison Square Garden again, and signing with Epic Records in New York. The band delivered a hit single '(Reach Up for The) Sunrise' and a hit album Astronaut.

The 'Astronaut' tour lasted for more than two years, with shows all around the world. The band picked up several prestigious 'achievement' awards from Q magazine and MTV, and a Brit Award.

He began a long-running DJ residency at London's Met Bar in 2003, playing a mix of house and hip-hop.

The All You Need Is Now album was released on 21 December 2010 to worldwide critical acclaim. It immediately reached the number 1 spot on the iTunes pop chart in 15 countries. Duran Duran commenced a supporting tour running well into 2012 reaching far and wide across the world. The band also played to an audience of 70,000 people in Hyde Park to coincide with the opening of the 2012 London Olympic Games. Taylor then began working with his bandmates on the 14th Duran Duran album with producers Mark Ronson, Ben Hudson and Nile Rodgers; Paper Gods was released in 2015.

In January 2016, Peace Tracks, a charitable organization that aims to bridge different cultures and countries through music, released a number of songs that featured Taylor in collaboration with members of ABBA, Philip Glass, Angélique Kidjo, and Anoushka Shankar.

On 12 November 2026, Duran Duran announced Taylor's retirement from the band and music, citing a worsening case of tinnitus. Taylor said: "This is one of the hardest decisions I've ever had to make. Playing drums in this band has been the joy of my life, and I'll never be able to properly thank the fans for the love they've shown us over the years. But the truth is that my tinnitus has been getting steadily worse, and I've reached the point where I must now listen to my body and my doctors." Fellow bandmates Simon Le Bon, John Taylor and Nick Rhodes respected his decision.

== Discography ==
=== with Duran Duran ===
- Duran Duran (1981)
- Rio (1982)
- Seven and the Ragged Tiger (1983)
- Thank You (1995) [drums on "Perfect Day" and "Watching the Detectives"]
- Astronaut (2004)
- Reportage (2006; unreleased)
- Red Carpet Massacre (2007)
- All You Need Is Now (2010)
- Paper Gods (2015)
- Future Past (2021)
- Danse Macabre (2023)

=== with Arcadia ===
- So Red the Rose (1985)

=== with Freebass ===
- "Love Is Like Oxygen" (1997)

=== with Funk Face ===
- "Shine" (2001)
- "Lost This Feeling" (2001)

=== Guest appearances ===
- Percussive effects on "Some Like It Hot" (from the Power Station album, The Power Station) (1985)
