= Night Versions: The Essential Duran Duran =

Essential Duran Duran (Night Versions)

Remix album by Duran Duran
- Released: 31 March 1998
- Genre: New wave
- Length: 70:30
- Label: EMI
- Producer: Duran Duran and various

Duran Duran chronology
| Medazzaland (1997) | Essential Duran Duran (Night Versions) (1998) | Greatest (1998) |

Professional ratings
Review scores
| Source | Rating |
|---|---|
| AllMusic | 3/5 stars |
| The Encyclopedia of Popular Music | 3/5 stars |
| Pitchfork | 4.6/10 |

Essential Duran Duran (Night Versions) is a remix album by the English pop rock band Duran Duran. From the beginning of their career, the band dubbed the extended dance remixes of their songs "night versions", as they were intended for play in nightclubs.

Unlike many of their contemporaries, Duran Duran did not simply extend the intro or loop the bridge of a song to pad out a dance track for a 12-inch single. As AllMusic explained, "According to Nick Rhodes' liner notes, they recorded extended versions of their singles to be used in night clubs. Rather than have the master tapes cut and taped into remixes, Duran Duran went back into the studio and recorded longer versions of the songs with more instrumental breaks."

The collection had been in the works for some time, but was released by Capitol/EMI in April 1998, around the same time that Duran Duran was dismissed from the record label after an 18-year history. EMI was quick to start mining the band's back catalogue; Night Versions was followed seven months later by the greatest hits collection Greatest, and by another remix collection Strange Behaviour four months after that.

Similar to other releases in Capitol's "Essential" range, this disc was commercially available for only six months from the time of release. This may account for the inflated aftermarket value of the disc, considering all the material and more was released on the latter Strange Behaviour collection. It has given influence not only in title but also to its concept to the album Nite Versions by Soulwax.

== Track listing ==
1. "Planet Earth" (Night Version) – 6:16
2. "Girls on Film" (Night Version) – 5:27
3. "My Own Way" (Night Version) – 6:34
4. "Hungry Like the Wolf" (Night Version) – 5:14
5. "Rio" (12" Dance Version) – 6:42
6. "New Religion" (Night Version) – 5:14
7. "Hold Back the Rain" (Remix; Carnival version) – 7:00
8. "Is There Something I Should Know?" (Monster Mix) – 6:40
9. "Union of the Snake" (Monkey Mix) – 6:23
10. "The Reflex" (Dance Mix) – 6:34
11. "The Wild Boys" (Wilder Than Wild Boys Extended Mix) – 8:00
12. "New Moon on Monday" (Extended Mix) – 6:00
