= Duran Duran's charity concert at Villa Park 1983 =

Benefit concert in Birmingham, England

- Benefit concert by Duran Duran
- Official programme cover
- Location: Birmingham, England
- Venue: Villa Park
- Date(s): 23 July 1983
- Duration: 4 hours
- Supporting acts: Prince Charles and the City Beat Band; Robert Palmer
- Attendance: 18,000+

On 23 July 1983, English pop rock band Duran Duran staged an open air benefit concert at Villa Park, Birmingham, England in front of over 18,000 people who paid £8.50 a ticket to raise money for Mencap. It was one of only two concerts that summer by the band, the other being on 20 July before the Prince and Princess of Wales at London's Dominion Theatre.

Birmingham was chosen as the venue, as it was where the band members' first met and formed the group. The concert and subsequent shows in the area have always been regarded as a "homecoming". This event was particularly special to Roger Taylor as he once had ambitions to be Aston Villa's goalkeeper and was a regular spectator at the ground.

== Background ==
The show started at 6 PM when the host, BBC Radio 1 presenter Peter Powell, introduced the opening act "Prince Charles and the City Beat Band", which was followed by Robert Palmer who included the songs "Johnny and Mary" and "Some Guys Have All the Luck" in his performance. Friendships from this concert helped Palmer, in late 1984, to join members of Duran Duran as lead singer of the super group the Power Station.

Finally, Duran Duran took to the stage at 20:40 hours beginning their opening song as two giant black curtains slid open revealing them on a brightly lit stage with a backdrop consisting of six inflatable Roman-style pillars designed by Henry Thompson. The band performed the following:

1. "Is There Something I Should Know?"
2. "Hungry Like the Wolf"
3. "Union of the Snake"
4. "Lonely in Your Nightmare"
5. "New Religion"
6. "Night Boat"
7. "Friends of Mine"
8. "Save a Prayer"
9. "Planet Earth"
10. "My Own Way"
11. "Hold Back the Rain"
12. "Careless Memories"
13. "Rio"
14. "Fun Time"
15. "Girls on Film"

The concert finished at 22:00 hours with an after show "homecoming" party held at the city's Rum Runner nightclub.

The programme which consists of 11 glossy double sided flyers with pictures on each side housed in a white glossy folder cost £2.00.

== Band line-up ==
- Simon Le Bon – vocals
- John Taylor – bass guitar
- Andy Taylor – guitar
- Nick Rhodes – keyboards
- Roger Taylor – drums
