= Hold Back the Rain =

- "Save a Prayer" UK picture sleeve (reverse)

Song by Duran Duran

from the album Rio
- Released: 10 May 1982
- Recorded: January – 19 March 1982
- Studio: AIR (London)
- Genre: Synth-pop
- Length: 3:50
- Label: EMI
- Songwriters: Simon Le Bon; John Taylor; Roger Taylor; Andy Taylor; Nick Rhodes
- Producer: Colin Thurston

Audio video
- "Hold Back the Rain" on YouTube

"Hold Back the Rain" is a song by the English pop rock band Duran Duran, released on 10 May 1982 as the fifth track on their second studio album, Rio. Written during the band's first American tour, its lyrics were penned by lead vocalist Simon Le Bon as a message to bassist John Taylor. Musically, the song is synth-pop and combines elements of post-punk, new wave, and disco. It features a driving bassline, fast-paced rhythms, and prominent gated snare drums.

Multiple versions of "Hold Back the Rain" exist due to various mixes and edits made during its production and subsequent releases. A remixed version was later included in U.S. pressings of Rio, leading to confusion over which mix was the original. The song also appeared as the B-side to the singles "Save a Prayer" and "Rio", contributing to its airplay and recognition. Retrospectively, "Hold Back the Rain" has been regarded as one of Duran Duran's standout tracks, with publications such as Classic Pop and The A.V. Club ranking it among the band's best songs.

== Development and recording ==
During Duran Duran's first American tour in 1981, the lead vocalist Simon Le Bon wrote the lyrics to "Hold Back the Rain" on a piece of paper and slipped them under the bassist John Taylor's hotel room door; to this day, they have never talked about them. The song was later arranged and recorded at London's AIR Studios for their second album Rio (1982). According to the album's liner notes, the song was completed on 19 March 1982.

== Mixing and aftermath ==
There are multiple versions of "Hold Back the Rain" due to various mixes and edits made during its production and release. According to a member of Duran Duran, the song was originally mixed in London for the Rio album, with several different edits produced. At some point, a different version was unintentionally used when the album was repressed. Following the band's first U.S. tour during the Rio album cycle, they worked with the producer David Kershenbaum in Los Angeles to remix several tracks, including "Hold Back the Rain". These remixes were primarily intended for the Carnival EP and for radio promotion in the United States. Additional edits to the track were also made during this process. This remixed version of "Hold Back the Rain" was later included in U.S. pressings of Rio, leading many listeners to assume it was the original. Further confusion arose when EMI UK released a limited edition Rio CD and attempted, but failed, to identify the original mix. Some American fans believed the wrong version had been used, though the band recalled it as the correct one. Before its release in 2001, the keyboardist Nick Rhodes addressed the issue, stating, "I am personally overseeing it to [e]nsure that it is in fact the same music as what was on the original Rio album". When the vinyl album of Rio was issued on CD, yet another version of the song was included, contributing to the continued variation across different releases.

== Composition ==
Musically, "Hold Back the Rain" is a synth-pop song with elements of post-punk, new wave, and disco. The song features fast-paced rhythms that create a sense of urgency and movement, though it is less dense than "Rio", another upbeat track on the album. Key elements of the composition include Taylor's driving bassline, which provides a propulsive foundation, and gated snare drums, which Pitchfork describes as being "strafe[d]" with. Mark Elliott of Dig! highlighted its "stabbing, addictive synths", calling it Rio's "most club-oriented cut". AllMusic's Ned Raggett noted the song's "invigorating blast of feedback, keyboards, and beat that doesn't let up".

Lyrically, the song was written as a message to Taylor, with Le Bon expressing concern over his excessive partying. Le Bon explained to VH1 that Taylor was "staying out too late, taking too many drugs, drinking too much, going home with the wrong kinds of people". While the melody and energy align with the exuberance found throughout Rio, Flynn Rik of Classic Pop suggests a murkier tone beneath the surface.

== Release and reception ==
"Hold Back the Rain" was released on 10 May 1982, by EMI as the fifth track on Duran Duran's second album, Rio. The song was also used as the B-side for "Save a Prayer", released as a single on August 9, 1982, and for "Rio", released on 1 November 1982. The song received significant airplay due to this exposure, leading some to call it the "lost Duran Duran single."

Some consider "Hold Back the Rain" one of Duran Duran's best songs. Both Classic Pop and The A.V. Club ranked it among the band's top tracks, placing it at 10th and 14th, respectively. In a retrospective assessment, Stephen Thomas Erlewine of The A.V. Club highlighted the song's ability to sustain the energy of Rio, particularly in its placement immediately after "Hungry Like the Wolf". He noted that despite following one of the band's most iconic tracks, "Hold Back the Rain" successfully builds upon its momentum. Classic Pop's Mark Lindores called it "An all-time Duran Duran highlight."

== Personnel ==
"Hold Back the Rain" credits adapted from AllMusic:

Duran Duran

- Simon Le Bon – vocals
- Nick Rhodes – keyboards, synthesisers
- John Taylor – bass guitar
- Andy Taylor – guitars
- Roger Taylor – drums, percussion

=== Technical ===
- Colin Thurston – production and engineering
