= Strange Behaviour =

Remix album by Duran Duran
- Released: 23 March 1999
- Recorded: 1980–1993
- Length: 76:45 (disc 1); 77:32 (disc 2)
- Label: EMI
- Producer: Duran Duran and various

Duran Duran chronology
Greatest (1998)	Strange Behaviour (1999)	Pop Trash (2000)

Professional ratings
Review scores
Source	Rating
AllMusic	3/5 stars
The Encyclopedia of Popular Music	2/5 stars
NME	1/10

Strange Behaviour is a remix album by the English pop rock band Duran Duran. It was released by EMI in March 1999.

The title comes from a line in the song "Skin Trade": "would someone please explain, the reason for this strange behaviour". The band had previously used "Strange Behaviour" as the name of their 1987 tour. A 1987 EP of remixes from the Notorious album that was released in Italy and Japan under the title "Strange Behavior" (American-English spelling without the 'u', rather than the British spelling used here).

Having dropped Duran Duran after their 1997 album Medazzaland, EMI was keen to begin mining the band's back catalogue. They had already released a new hits collection called Greatest (1998) and were finally getting around to releasing versions of songs that were not easily obtainable on CD.

In years to come, EMI would continue to mine the band's catalogue by reissuing the first four albums (Arena including two bonus tracks), as well as two singles boxsets and a collection of videos.

== The music ==
Released on two CDs, the collection really split the remixed output of Duran Duran down the middle. The first CD featured all the 12" mixes released during the initial period of the original lineup during 1981–1984, as well as remixes of several album tracks.

For the release of this compilation, EMI inadvertently unearthed two previously unreleased remixes, the Night mix of "Planet Earth" and a remix of "Hold Back the Rain".

CD Two features remixes from a new era when singles were being released with multiple remixes. As such, EMI cherry picked remixes from various sources for the second disc.

Some of these were commissioned but never used, like the "Love Voodoo" remix, or released on promotional only singles like the dub mix of "I Don't Want Your Love", the Chemical Reaction mix of "American Science" and the Jellybean Benitez remix of "Too Much Information", the latter originally appearing on a 12" on the DJ service SIN label.

== Track listing ==
Disc one (1981–1984)

1. "Planet Earth" (Night Mix) – 6:58
2. "Girls on Film" (Night Version) – 5:31
3. "My Own Way" (Night Version) – 6:37
4. "Hungry Like the Wolf" (Night Version) – 5:12
5. "Hold Back the Rain" (Remix) – 6:38
6. "Rio" (Carnival Version) – 6:41
7. "New Religion" (Carnival Version) – 5:19
8. "Is There Something I Should Know?" (Monster Mix) – 6:41
9. "Union of the Snake" (The Monkey Mix) – 6:28
10. "New Moon on Monday" (Extended Version) – 6:03
11. "The Reflex" (Dance Mix) – 6:33
12. "The Wild Boys" (Wilder Than Wild Boys Extended Mix) – 8:01

Disc two (1986–1993)

1. "Notorious" (Extended Mix) – 5:15
2. "Skin Trade" (Stretch Mix) – 7:41
3. "'Meet El Presidente'" (12" Version) – 7:14
4. "American Science" (Chemical Reaction Mix) – 7:42
5. "I Don't Want Your Love" (Dub Mix) – 7:36
6. "All She Wants Is" (US Master Mix) – 7:19
7. "Violence of Summer (Love's Taking Over)" (Power Mix) – 4:58
8. "Come Undone (Come Undub)" – 4:47
9. "Love Voodoo" (Sidney St. 12" Mix) – 4:40
10. "Too Much Information" (12" Jellybean Mix) – 6:43
11. "None of the Above" (Drizabone 12" Mix) – 6:36
12. "Drowning Man" (D:Ream Ambient Mix) – 6:45
