= Patrick Nagel (disambiguation) =

Patrick Nagel (1945–1984) was an American artist.

Patrick Nagel may also refer to:

- Patrick Nagel (footballer) (born 1990), German footballer

== See also ==
- Pat Nagle (born 1987), ice hockey player
