= Duran Duran Video 45 =

1983 video EP by Duran Duran

Video by Duran Duran
- Released: March 1983
- Recorded: 1981–1982
- Genre: Dance; new wave
- Length: 10 minutes
- Label: PMI (UK); Sony (US)
- Director: Russell Mulcahy; Godley & Creme
- Producer: Duran Duran

Duran Duran chronology
Duran Duran Video 45 (1983)	Duran Duran (1983)

Duran Duran Video 45 (or technically just Duran Duran, as Video 45 was the format) is a two-track video EP by Duran Duran. It was released in 1983 by PMI in the UK and Sony in the US. The release was originally intended to be like a video single, hence the Video 45 nomenclature.

The EP was released in both the VHS and the Betamax format. The VHS release included the "day" version of "Girls on Film" as well as the video for "Hungry Like the Wolf", while the Beta release included the "night" version of "Girls on Film" instead. The Beta versions were included in the Duran Duran video album later in the year.

== Track listings ==
=== VHS: Sony / SO 97005 (US) ===
1. "Girls on Film" – 3:24 (Shepperton Studios)
2. "Hungry Like the Wolf" – 3:37 (Sri Lanka)

=== Betamax: Sony / (US) ===
1. "Girls on Film" (Uncensored Night Version) – 6:15 (Shepperton Studios)
2. "Hungry Like the Wolf" – 3:37 (Sri Lanka)
