= Rio (Duran Duran album) =

1982 studio album by Duran Duran

Studio album by Duran Duran
- Released: 10 May 1982
- Recorded: January–March 1982
- Studio: AIR (London)
- Genres: New wave; synth-pop; pop rock; dance-rock
- Length: 42:38
- Label: EMI
- Producer: Colin Thurston

Duran Duran chronology
Duran Duran (1981)	Rio (1982)	Seven and the Ragged Tiger (1983)

Singles from Rio
- 1. "Hungry Like the Wolf" Released: 4 May 1982; 2. "Save a Prayer" Released: 9 August 1982; 3. "Rio" Released: 1 November 1982

Rio is the second studio album by the English pop rock band Duran Duran, released on 10 May 1982 through EMI. Produced by Colin Thurston, the band wrote and demoed most of the material before recording the album at AIR Studios in London from January to March 1982. The band utilised more experimentation compared to their debut album, from vibraphone and marimba to the sound of a cigarette being lit and cracking ice cubes. Andy Hamilton played a saxophone solo on the title track "Rio".

A new wave, synth-pop, pop rock and dance-rock album with musical elements such as disco and funk, Rio is mostly composed of fast, upbeat numbers, with some slower synthesiser-based ballads. Lead vocalist Simon Le Bon's lyrics cover topics from chasing one's dreams to pursuing a love interest. Bassist John Taylor conceived the title, which the band felt represented the optimistic and exotic tone of the album. The cover artwork, painted by Patrick Nagel and designed by Malcolm Garrett to resemble 1950s cigar packaging, is considered one of the greatest of all time.

Duran Duran shot music videos for many of the album's tracks, all of which helped spearhead the 1980s MTV revolution. Accompanied by three worldwide hit singles, Rio peaked at number two in the United Kingdom and remained in the chart for 110 weeks. Initially unsuccessful in the United States, the album was remixed by Capitol Records to better match American radio at the time; this version spent 129 weeks on the Billboard albums chart, reaching number six. The band toured the US and Europe throughout the latter half of 1982.

Rio initially received mixed-to-negative reviews from critics, who commended the melodies but disparaged the lyrics. Retrospective reviewers consider Rio timeless and the band's best work, praising its instrumentation and band performances. With the album, Duran Duran were forerunners in the Second British Invasion of the 1980s, helping ensure the success of other English artists throughout the decade. It has since made appearances on best-of lists and has been reissued several times.

== Background and development ==
Duran Duran released their self-titled debut album in June 1981. Aided by the album's highly successful third single "Girls on Film", the album peaked at number three in the UK and remained in the charts for over two years. With the album, Duran Duran had established themselves as one of the biggest new pop groups of 1981. Around July, they began writing songs for their second studio album, spending time at their resident nightclub the Rum Runner in Birmingham like their debut. The band's label, EMI Records, doubled their budget for the new record. Feeling pressure in England, the band briefly withdrew to a secluded château in France to continue writing. Keyboardist Nick Rhodes later stated:

When we went into the rest of the writing to prepare the Rio album, we hadn't really had time to think about the success that we'd achieved with the first album. We'd already moved on, and we'd got some songs that we thought were as good, if not better, than some of the songs on the first album already.

On 28 August 1981, Duran Duran recorded demos of several songs that would appear on their next album, including "Last Chance on the Stairway", "My Own Way", "New Religion" and "Like an Angel", at the basement studio of EMI's Manchester Square building. (Note: The same building on the cover of the Beatles' Please Please Me (1963).) According to bassist John Taylor, the demo of "Last Chance on the Stairway" was identical to the final album version, while "My Own Way" and "New Religion" both had different arrangements. (Note: Author Annie Zaleski states that this version of "New Religion" was similar to the final version on Rio.) This version of "My Own Way" was dance-inspired and featured bursts of electric guitar, a different bassline and pattering percussion. Dissatisfied with this version, the band rerecorded the song during the official sessions. An early version of "The Chauffeur" was also taped with German sound engineer Renate Blauel.

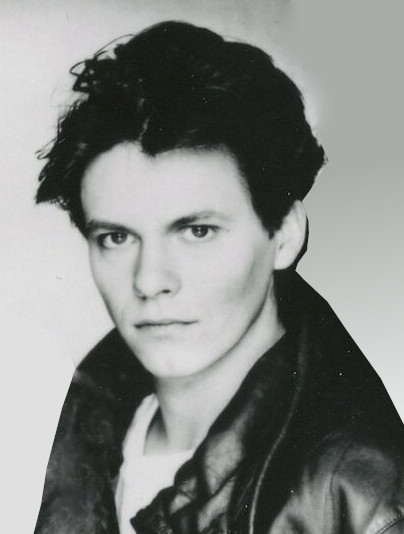
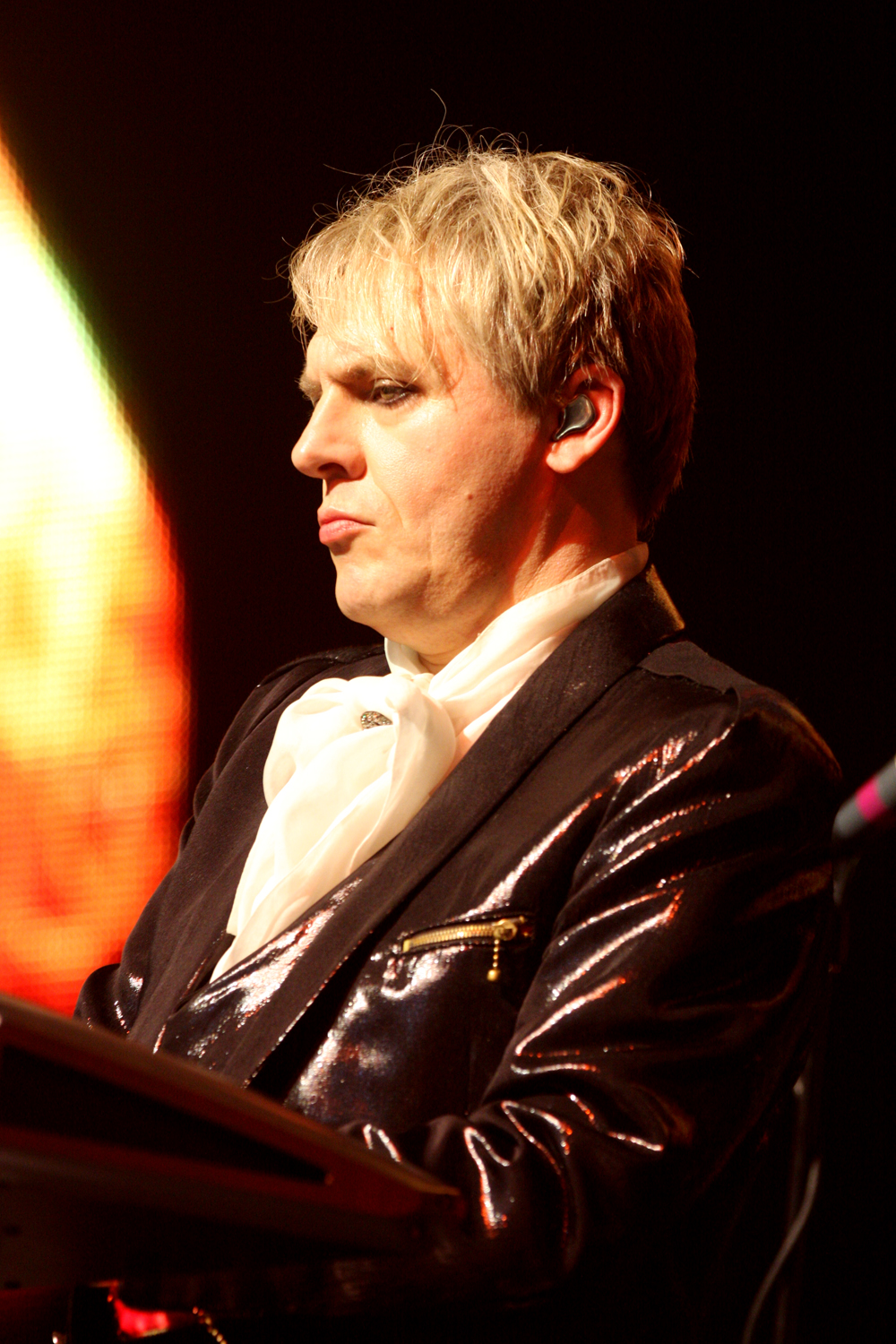
Several tracks were written in collaboration by guitarist Andy Taylor (left, in 1983) and keyboardist Nick Rhodes (right, in 2012).

Both "Hungry Like the Wolf" and "Save a Prayer" were the result of collaborations between Rhodes and guitarist Andy Taylor; Rhodes began on synthesiser, which Taylor fashioned into guitar riffs. The latter commented, "When we wrote 'Hungry', I knew we had the album right." The band taped demos of "Save a Prayer" and "Lonely in Your Nightmare" at engineer Bob Lamb's home studio in Birmingham. The band used this material for reference during the proper sessions, particularly for the sequenced-based tracks "Save a Prayer" and "The Chauffeur".

Duran Duran continued promotional appearances and live performances throughout September and October 1981, including their first American tour. EMI wanted a new single, so the band returned to England and taped a new version of "My Own Way", boasting disco and American R&B-influenced production, with "Like an Angel" as the B-side. Released on 16 November 1981 in England only, the single spent 11 weeks on the chart, hitting number 14. Rhodes disliked the single-only release: "It was the only time we actually sat down and said, 'Ok, we've got to write a hit single now'." The band underwent the Careless Memories tour in December, featuring 17 sold-out dates, before taking a holiday break.

== Recording ==
The recording sessions for Rio commenced in January 1982 at London's AIR Studios and lasted six to eight weeks. The members rented apartments in close vicinity to the studio during the duration of the sessions. Colin Thurston returned from the debut as producer and engineer. The band were excited to record at AIR, having previously demoed "Girls on Film" there in July 1980. Founded by former Beatles producer George Martin, the studio boasted high-tech equipment that Rhodes, in particular, was eager to experiment with. (Note: The band returned to AIR to record most of 1986's Notorious.) The keyboardist devoted time learning production techniques with Thurston and was purportedly the first to arrive and last to leave every day.

[Rio] was such a lovely, simple record to make. It wasn't massively overlaid with different tracks, or different edits. It was just literally as it was played.

— Roger Taylor, 2021

According to John Taylor, all of the songs, except for "The Chauffeur", were fully arranged before recording began; "Rio" had been played during multiple sound checks. Recording followed the same template as the debut: the bass, drums and synthesiser parts were recorded first, followed by guitar, keyboard overdubs and vocals. The band recalled recording going by relatively easily. Drummer Roger Taylor recorded his parts quickly and returned to Birmingham with his girlfriend, while John Taylor and Andy Taylor dwelled at the Embassy Club on Old Bond Street throughout the sessions. At AIR, Paul and Linda McCartney, who were recording the former's Tug of War LP in the adjacent studio, stopped by on occasion to say good night, a gesture Rhodes described as "very surreal"; John also listened back to a mix of the finished Rio album with Paul.

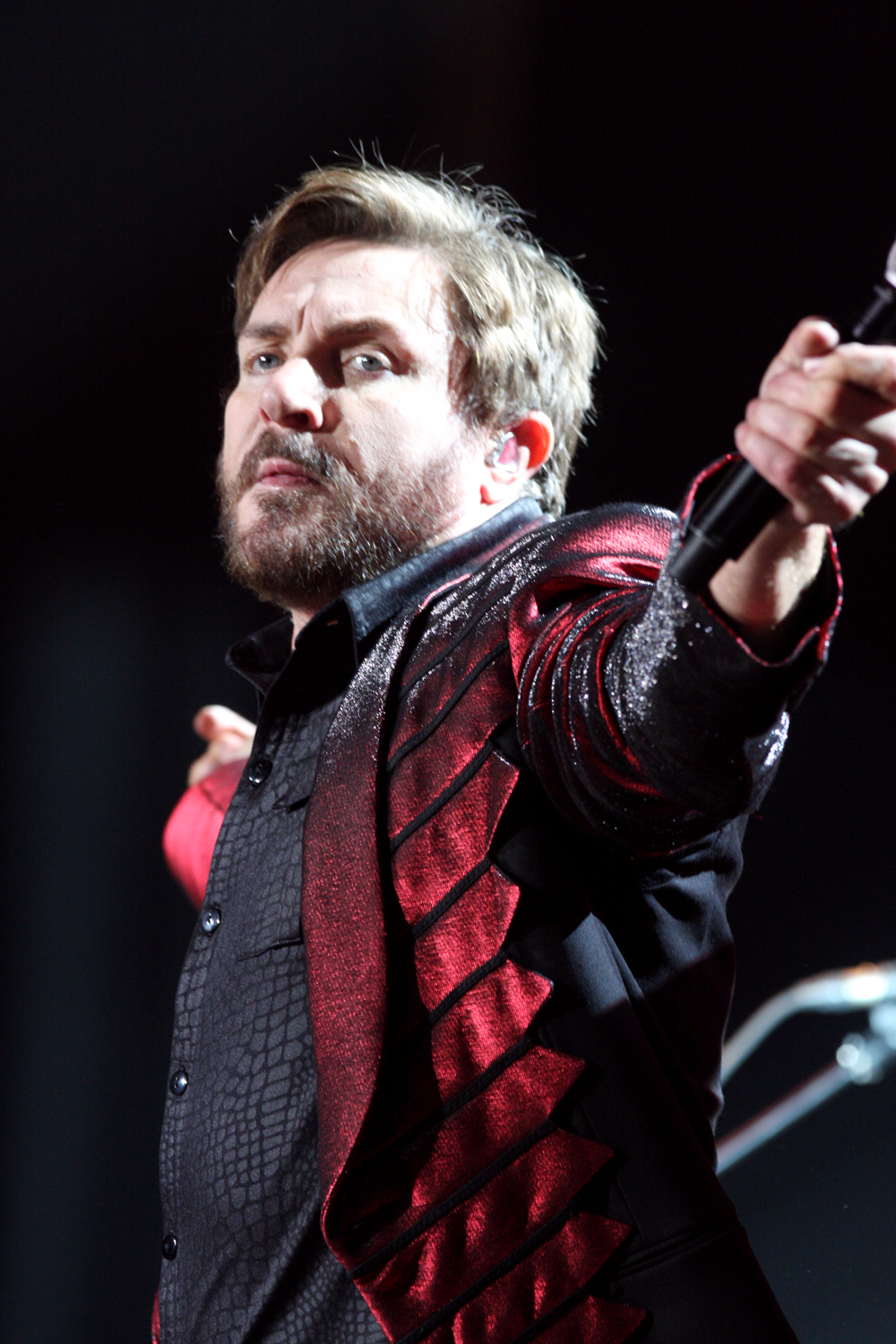
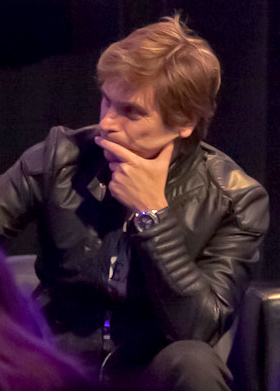
The sessions saw lead vocalist Simon Le Bon (left, in 2014) experiment with vibraphone and marimba, while drummer Roger Taylor (right, in 2011) used electronic drums over his acoustic set.

Having defined the majority of the arrangements before recording began, the band sharpened their individual performances and experimented with different sounds. John Taylor played fretless bass on "Lonely in Your Nightmare", while lead vocalist Simon Le Bon added vibraphone and marimba to "New Religion" and "Last Chance on the Stairway", respectively. Rhodes added the sound of a cigarette being lit and clinking glasses to the latter, while "Hungry Like the Wolf" opens with a giggle from his then-girlfriend Cheryl. With Thurston, Roger Taylor melded accents from his Simmons' electronic drum kit to multiple tracks, hooking up the electronic tom-toms to his acoustic set. He said in 2021: "I'd play an acoustic drum kit and just lay the Simmons over the top. [...] And I'm glad that we did that. ...it was great to have something modern coming through as part of the kit, but it didn't completely dominate the sound."

Saxophonist Andy Hamilton played the solo on "Rio". Hamilton had previously contributed to the "night version" of "Planet Earth" and performed with Duran Duran on their 1981 European tour dates. He mostly improvised his part, basing most of the solo on two chords. Rhodes oversaw Hamilton's part, which he later described as "more of an integral melody within the song rather than a solo", leading it to be played the same way during concert performances. The track's opening was created when Rhodes dropped metal rods onto the strings of the studio's grand piano and flipped the tape over, reversing the sound.

"The Chauffeur" was created on the spot in the studio. During downtime, Rhodes retreated to an auxiliary studio room with Blauel, their tape operator, and crafted a track using keyboards, synthesisers, the sound of an ice cube cracking and a conversation about nature for extra effects. Le Bon accompanied him and brought lyrics inspired by a 1979 visit to a kibbutz in Israel, further adding a melody on an ocarina. The final track features no contributions from the three Taylors. An acoustic version was recorded without Rhodes, which appeared as a B-side to "Rio". The keyboardist later quipped, "I guess that was my punishment for have created an entirely electronic track."

=== Mixing ===
The band were contracted to finish mixing the album by the end of March 1982 and were due to fly to Sri Lanka to film music videos before their tour of Australia commenced in mid-April. With the record still unfinished, Le Bon, John Taylor and Roger Taylor flew to Sri Lanka while Rhodes and Andy Taylor stayed in London with Thurston to make some last-minute tweaks; according to biographer Steve Malins, the trio worked for 48 hours straight. Once completed, Rhodes and Andy flew to Sri Lanka, the former listening to and analysing Rio the entire ride.

== Music and lyrics ==
It's a much more inward-looking album than the first album, [...] I think that Rio was much more about ourselves responding to each other, and the experiences that we were having, rather than what was going on outside us.

— John Taylor on Rio

Musically, Rio is a new wave, synth-pop, pop rock and disco-rock album, that contains elements of dance, post-punk, rock, disco, funk and gothic rock. According to author Stephen Davis, EMI wanted the band to change direction from their debut, desiring more of a rock-edged dance groove, telling Thurston: "Think Led Zeppelin and Talking Heads having a baby and calling it Duran Duran." The band's influences at the time included Roxy Music, David Bowie, Japan, pre-Dare Human League and 1970s UK guitar rock. AllMusic's Donald Guarisco retrospectively compared the title track's instrumental to the Roxy Music releases Flesh and Blood (1980) and Avalon (1982), even associating Hamilton's saxophone solo to Andy Mackay's contributions to Roxy Music. Rhodes later described the album's sound as "elegant punk".

"Hungry Like the Wolf"
A 23-second sample from "Hungry Like the Wolf", featuring Rhodes' girlfriend's laugh at the beginning, Le Bon's vocals with a backing track that mixes a Roland TR-808 drum machine, and a Roland Jupiter-8, and the repeating of the word "do" at the end.

Of the album's nine tracks, the first seven ("Rio" to "Last Chance on the Stairway") are faster and more upbeat numbers, while the last two ("Save a Prayer" and "The Chauffeur") are slower and atmospheric synthesiser-based ballads. In Ultimate Classic Rock, writer Annie Zaleski described the rhythm section of John Taylor and Roger Taylor as "formidable" and "locked into grooves with nimble precision", with Rhodes's synthesisers adding "artsy textures" and Andy Taylor's "blazing guitar acrobatics" bringing "ferocity and heft" to the tracks; Malins highlights "Hungry Like the Wolf" and "New Religion" as showcasing Andy's guitar. The album's production is sparser than that of the debut, although Rhodes felt its bouts of studio experimentation made Rio definitively theirs: "It sounds like us – I don't think it sounds like anybody else."

Le Bon turned to his experiences on their first American tour for inspiration in writing the lyrics. In a nod to artists such as Joy Division and the Doors' Jim Morrison, the lyrics of Rio touch on topics from chasing one's dreams and finding one's place in the world, to pursuing a love interest and providing solace to a friend—mainly using dark and poetic words. The title track paints a picture of a girl with a "cherry ice cream smile" that is "too lovely to resist"; "Save a Prayer" concerns a couple's love affair that ends too soon; and "The Chauffeur" conveys images of restless driving and attractive women. Malins says that Le Bon's lyrics are sometimes full of the "most obtuse tongue-twisters", with "New Religion" being presented as "a dialogue between the ego and the alter ego", but he does find the line "no time to worry cause we're on the roam again" in "Hold Back the Rain" perfectly encapsulates the album's "high spirits". Guarisco argued that Le Bon's "stream-of-consciousness" lyrics on tracks like "Rio" and "The Chauffeur" primarily add to the tracks' personalities rather than mean anything "in the literal sense".

== Title and packaging ==
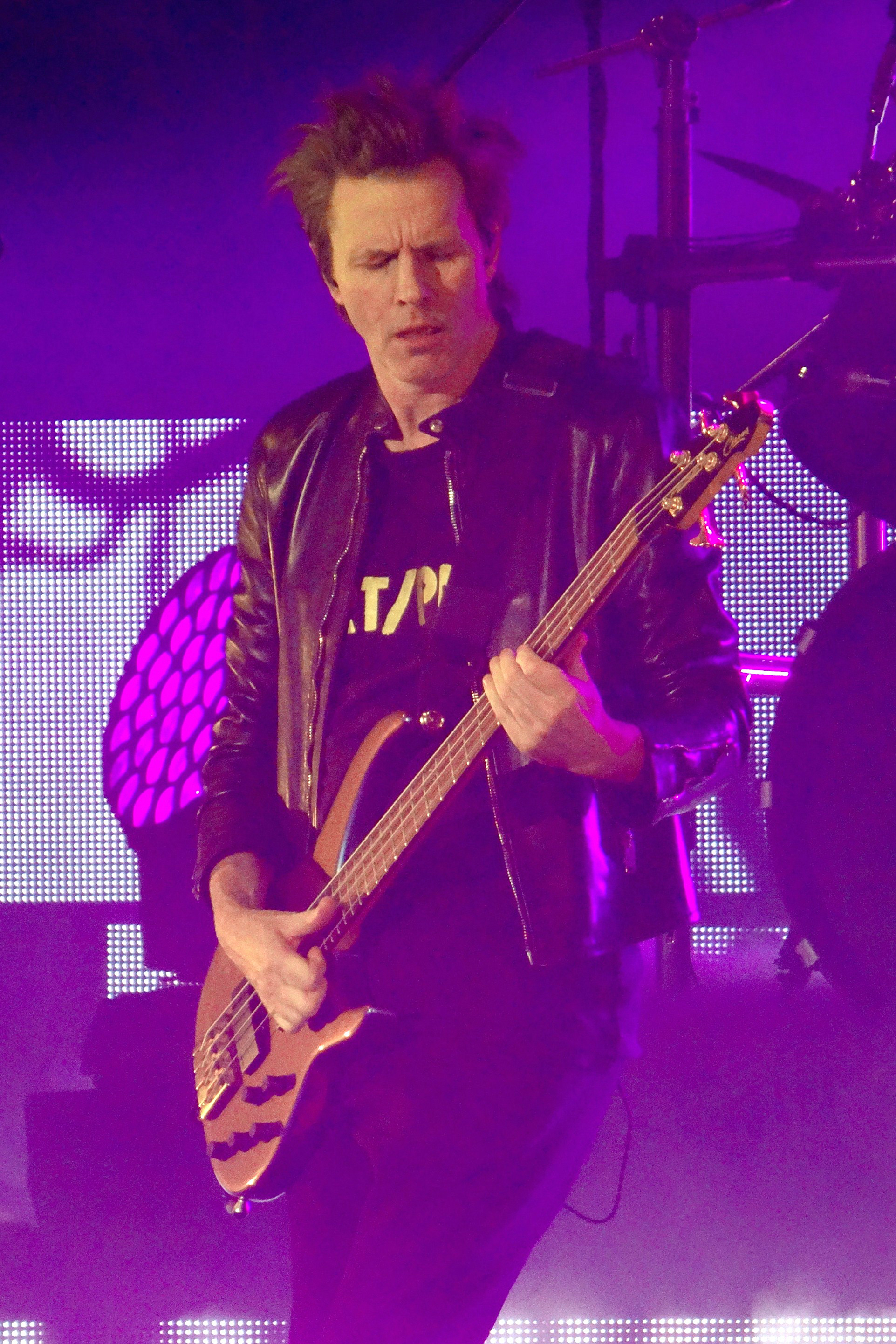
Bassist John Taylor (pictured in 2014) devised the album's title.

John Taylor came up with the album's title in 1981 during the band's worldwide tour supporting their debut. Taylor, who had never left England before, was taken by the glamour and excitement of the road which included stops in Los Angeles, New York City, Paris and Berlin. While visiting Brazil, he was fascinated with the idea of exotica, stating in his memoir: "Rio [de Janeiro], to me, was shorthand for the truly foreign, the exotic, a cornucopia of earthly delights, a party that would never stop." The other band members liked the title, feeling it encapsulated the "more optimistic" tone of the entire album. Le Bon later said: "The word looks great, sounds great and makes people think of parties, rivers – it's Spanish for river! – foreign places and sunshine."

Duran Duran themselves do not appear on the front cover of Rio, which was a stylistic departure from their debut and most albums at the time; the band felt that photographs and the music videos would suffice. Instead, the cover artwork is a portrait of a woman with striking make-up, a large smile and black hair. It was painted by artist Patrick Nagel, who was commissioned by the band after co-manager Paul Berrow discovered his work while browsing a Playboy magazine, to which Nagel was a regular contributor. Refining his trademark style, Nagel presented two options: a woman with a flower in her hair sitting sideways and the chosen shot of a woman smiling. Rhodes recalled, "We all said instantly: 'Yes, that's it. That's the cover." Author Elena G. Millie described her as the "quintessential" 1980s woman: "elegant and sophisticated, alluring but cool, stark but sensual, mysterious, contradictory and utterly contemporary". In 2024, it was revealed that cover girl was based on a photograph of the fashion model Marcie Hunt in the February 1981 issue of Vogue France.

Malcolm Garrett, who had designed the cover artworks for the band's singles and first album, had "no more than a week" to complete the final sleeve design. Garrett, who had yet to hear the title track, stated that Rio "made me think of cigars and cigar packaging. The whole idea of something Latin and something Cuban and South American." Disliking album sleeves at the time having a plain image on the front and nothing on the back, he wrapped the painting around the front and back of the sleeve, later saying it was a conceptual choice: "You've got to go through the picture to get to the album." Like cigar packaging, initial pressings had a physical sticker sealing the LP shut, a design choice that was pasted directly onto the sleeve for later reissues. For the title's typeface, Garrett used a retro style that was also evocative of 1950s cigar packaging. He received credit on the sleeve itself with "Assorted Images" integrated into the design. Duran Duran loved the finished design, with Rhodes stating that "it just seemed to represent everything we wanted at that point". Duran Duran became closely associated with the sleeve's image over the course of their career. The original drawing hung at Paul Berrow's office at the Rum Runner before the band stole it on their way to appear on Top of the Pops, after which the members each took turns hanging it in their respective houses or apartments.

Garrett used the sleeve to establish a distinctive system of visual elements that provided "conceptual continuity" across Rio's advertising, tour materials, merchandise and singles, which he also supervised. He stated in 2000: "What we were doing with music then was always about creating and defining a visual world in which the fans operated and could come to understand." In a mix-up between the band and the Japanese label, Nagel's second rejected image was used for the Japanese single release of "My Own Way", issued months ahead of Rio. Rhodes later quipped: "No one had told the Japanese label that we hadn't actually bought that one."

A lyric sheet and a band portrait appears in the LP liner. Deliberately incongruous to the album title, Duran Duran were photographed on the top of the British Petroleum Building, the tallest building in London at the time, against a modern nighttime skyline. They wore Antony Price suits, which they used for the subsequent music videos. Photographer Andy Earl recalled: "Because their music was so electronic, I wanted to try and create that energy in the picture. Just before the end of the exposure, I kicked the tripod, and that's what gives it this fizzy, electronic and glamorous look. Which, to me, captured the music and what they were all about."

== Promotion ==
=== Music videos ===
Music videos were shot for six of Rio's nine tracks. Russell Mulcahy, who had directed the video for "Planet Earth", worked with Duran Duran on videos for "Hungry Like the Wolf", "Save a Prayer" and "Lonely in Your Nightmare" in Sri Lanka, (Note: The location was chosen by the band at the insistence of Paul Berrow, who had recently holidayed there.) one for "Rio" in Antigua and one for "The Chauffeur" in London without the band's involvement; another video was commissioned for the single version of "My Own Way". Former film student Marcello Anciano acted as storyboard artist and art director for all the videos. The Sri Lanka videos emphasised the exotic location; "Hungry Like the Wolf" saw Le Bon cast as an Indiana Jones-type character, while "Save a Prayer" utilised elephants and found the band atop a mountain inspecting stone temples. (Note: Davis comments the Duran Duran videos became one of the final pieces of imagery to show the island nation's "paradise-like" state before the start of the decades-long Sri Lankan Civil War that erupted in 1983.) While there, Rhodes and John Taylor were homesick, while Andy Taylor contracted a fever from the water, requiring his hospitalisation on his return to England. The guitarist was "very run-down" for the subsequent Australian and Japanese tours throughout the second half of April 1982 and had an oxygen mask at the side of the stage for the shows. He fully recovered for the "Rio" shoot, which found the band sailing aboard yachts. (Note: A video for Duran Duran's "Night Boat" was also shot around this time.)

Duran Duran earned a large advance from EMI to film the videos, particularly the Sri Lanka ones, said to range between £30,000 and £55,000. (Note: Attributed to multiple references:) The label had strong faith in the group and wanted videos prepared in advance before Rio's release. Both the band and EMI had ambitious plans for promotion and devised the release of a full-length video album consisting of the best songs from both Duran Duran (1981) and Rio. Le Bon had declared the medium's importance in an interview with Smash Hits earlier in the year, stating, "I take video very seriously. I see it as an artform. Most people see it as a promotional device. [...] Videos are the 'talking pictures' of today's music industry." Rhodes and Roger Taylor also spoke about it to the Associated Press later in the year. Other band members were more reserved, particularly John Taylor.

Rio became one of the earliest and most successful albums to receive a large bulk of their promotion through MTV.

Although video albums originated as early as 1979, EMI's parent corporation, Thorn, intended for the proposed Duran Duran album to sell exquisitely in the VHS and home video markets. At the time, Britain saw the significance of music videos and, with programmes such as Top of the Pops, audiences were accustomed to watching bands perform on television. In America, music videos played a lesser role in promotion, as labels felt they were insignificant compared to radio. MTV, which launched in August 1981, soon provided a shift in this perspective, primarily due to the videos of British bands played on the channel. One of MTV's original VJs, Alan Hunter, later stated that while American artists took more literal approaches when producing videos, "the music of the young New Wave romantics [such as Duran Duran] lent itself better to a more ephemeral interpretation, or a little looser interpretation." Commenting on the more stylised British videos at the time, MTV co-founder John Sykes said:

[English videos] looked like television commercials—highly styled television commercials, because [English bands] understood the platform. And that's why when Duran Duran came over, they basically paved the way for other artists, because they really set a tone and painted a picture that no one had ever seen before in this country.

=== Release ===
EMI issued "Hungry Like the Wolf" as the lead single from the album on 4 May 1982; Duran Duran mimed to the song on Top of the Pops nine days later. Entering the UK Singles Chart at number 35, it reached the top ten by the end of May, and peaked at number five in late June. Its accompanying video received frequent rotation on MTV by early July.

Shortly after the lead single, EMI issued Rio on 10 May 1982. It debuted at number four and reached number two by 22 May, behind the Madness greatest hits compilation Complete Madness. Rio remained in the UK chart for 110 weeks, including 96 consecutive weeks until March 1984. A tour EP generated publicity in Australia, leading "Hungry Like the Wolf" and Rio both reaching the top ten. In interviews, Duran Duran disassociated themselves with New Romanticism, as the band wanted to set themselves apart from "any broader movement", drawing comparisons to Spandau Ballet and Ultravox.

Initial European tour dates were delayed to September 1982 due to Andy Taylor falling ill. Instead, the band toured the US throughout July, attracting their largest audiences to date, later opening for Blondie in August. "Save a Prayer" was released in England as the second single on 9 August 1982, backed by a remix of "Hold Back the Rain", which charted at number two in the UK. Shortly before the European tour began, EMI issued interviews Le Bon made with Smash Hits and The Face as a 7″ picture single, titled An interview with Simon Le Bon. John Taylor injured his hand during the tour but fully recovered before a month-long UK tour that commenced on 30 October. Two days later, "Rio" appeared as a single in England and America, (Note: The British single had "The Chauffeur" as the B-side, while the American single was backed with "Hold Back the Rain".) reaching number nine in the former. In North America, "Save a Prayer" was not released as a single until January 1985 (after a live version of the song was included on the band's 1984 live album, Arena).

=== American remix ===
Rio's success in the UK, Australia and Japan initially went unmatched in the US. The first American release through Capitol-subsidiary Harvest Records debuted at number 164 on Billboard's Top LPs & Tape chart before stalling at number 122. Capitol executives attributed geography, size and what they viewed as zero hit singles to the low performance. One executive even claimed that radio was the only way to achieve success in the country.

With dwindling fortunes, Capitol promised more promotion if Duran Duran remixed Rio to better align with American radio. With staff producer David Kershenbaum, the band remixed four songs: Rio's "Hold Back the Rain", "My Own Way", "Hungry Like the Wolf" and Duran Duran's "Girls on Film". According to Davis, Kershenbaum's goal was to "make Duran Duran sound like Van Halen on an American pickup truck radio". Andy Taylor states in his memoir that the new mix gave the album "a smoother, cleaner sound" for US audiences, who were used to more polished feel than what was developed in the UK. John Taylor was unhappy with the remix, believing it represented the death of the band's original vision: "That was the end of Duran Duran, our original idea—an underground club band." Due to a lack of notice and a financial falling out with Paul Berrow, Thurston parted ways with the band, making Rio his final work with the group.

Capitol collected the remixes and released them as an EP in late September 1982 called Carnival. Packaged with band photos and liner notes, Carnival earned Duran Duran radio play throughout the US, hitting number 98 on Billboard's Hot 100 chart in early October. Following the successful remixes, Capitol rebranded Duran Duran as a dance band and commissioned Kershenbaum to remix the entire first side of the Rio album. In November, Capitol issued the remixed Rio and "Hungry Like the Wolf" single in the US (the latter entering the Hot 100 chart on the week of Christmas in 1982, eventually peaking at number 3 by late March 1983). With the music videos garnering heavy airplay on MTV and nationwide chart success, marketing executives pushed radio DJs to refer to Duran Duran as "the Fab Five". (Note: Mirroring the Beatles during the height of Beatlemania.) The remixed Rio charted at number six on the Billboard Top LPs & Tape chart in March 1983 and spent 129 weeks on the chart.

== Critical reception ==
Professional ratings
Contemporary reviews
Review scores
Source	Rating
The Philadelphia Inquirer	3/5 stars
Record Mirror	2/5 stars
Smash Hits	5½/10
The Village Voice	C−

Rio received mixed-to-negative reviews on release. Critics commended the melodies but ridiculed the lyrics. (Note: Attributed to multiple references:) Robin Denselow, in particular, mused in The Guardian: "Why do bands with no lyrical skill insist on printing their ghastly efforts on inside record sleeves?" He deemed the music "melodic, disposable pop to a best-selling formula". A writer for Record Mirror bluntly described Rio as "thoroughly competent and yet bereft of the soul, passion and wit that makes a great record". Allentown, Pennsylvania newspaper The Morning Call was also negative, finding the album "a pain in the butt to sit through". NME's Paul Du Noyer found a lack of artistic differentiation from their debut, stating, "What they've done is spin out the formula, quite efficiently." Deeming Rio "a sweet, lumpy pudding of a noise", he concluded: "In its own blandly unambitious way, I guess, it's a perfect record. In other ways, it's boring as hell." In The Village Voice, Robert Christgau deemed the LP "Anglodisco at its most solemnly expedient", feeling that "it lacks even the forced cheerfulness" of Haircut 100, and that "if it had as many hooks as A Flock of Seagulls (not bloody likely) it still wouldn't be silly enough to be any fun". By late 1983, The New York Times had dismissed Duran Duran as soulless, musically derivative and typical of the "frivolous dance-oriented synthesizer pop made by [British] fashion-conscious groups" that MTV had helped to popularise.

Other reviewers were warmer to the record. Writing for Smash Hits, Fred Dellar gave praise to the first three tracks, commenting that they "had me jotting down theories about the new golden age of pop", but by the LP's end, it turned into "yet another well-dressed but not totally satisfying album". In The Philadelphia Inquirer, Jack Lloyd wrote that Rio "indicates a strong feel for the pop market" and gave positive mentions to the instrumentation and accessible music. A writer for Billboard agreed, finding Rio "catchy, melodic and accessible", with tunes hewing toward "bright and sassy pop". A particularly positive review came from Melody Maker, wherein Steve Sutherland proclaimed Rio "the true culmination of the much-misunderstood New Romanticism – energetic, proud, enthusiastic, joyous; something to escape FULLY into". He expressed excitement in seeing where the band would go next. Ira Robbins was also positive in Trouser Press, finding the music showcased the young band as an emerging and creative talent: "Even when Duran Duran aims for the b.p.m. crowd, they display enough musical perspicacity to avoid tedium." In Dance Music Report, Dave Peaslee said that the album had slower and less dance-oriented songs than their previous LP, while concluding that "of all the more recent 'new wave' LP's released, this one seems the most faithful to the ideals of the new rockers. It sounds fresh, exciting, vibrant and new." He concluded that it was an "exquisite album".

== Influence and legacy ==
The success of Rio electrified the already-rising Second British Invasion. With their contemporaries the Human League, A Flock of Seagulls, Culture Club and Thomas Dolby, Duran Duran dominated the American pop charts throughout 1983 and led to the rise of other would-be successful British acts, including Tears for Fears, Eurythmics, Naked Eyes and the Rhodes-discovered Kajagoogoo. With Culture Club and Spandau Ballet, Duran Duran created a teen frenzy similar to Beatlemania during the first British Invasion of the 1960s. Additional UK acts, including Wham!, Frankie Goes to Hollywood, Pet Shop Boys and Dead or Alive, found American success in the ensuing years, alongside other bands who originated in small clubs like Duran Duran—the Cure, Depeche Mode, the Psychedelic Furs and Echo & the Bunnymen. David Bowie, Duran Duran's idol, also found massive commercial success in 1983 with Let's Dance.

According to Zaleski, Rio's "sonic approach—blasing electric guitars blended with moody synthesisers—became the dominant template for mainstream 1980s rock"; bands such as INXS used Duran Duran and Rio as a basis for their edgier and funkier sound. Discussing the album's impact, Yahoo! Music's Lyndsey Parker pondered: "Was there ever any album that embodied all things grand and glamorous about the escapist, excessive, exotic, erotic, aspirational '80s more than Duran Duran's Rio?"

Three decades after its release, John Taylor still held Rio in high regard, calling the songwriting "fantastic" and "essential Duran Duran". He also had high praise for the band's musicianship, arguing that each member was performing at their peaks. Rhodes admitted in 2022 that Rio was tough to top: "It's something that's been a double-edged sword for us, because it was such a powerful record, and perhaps the images from the videos stuck in people's minds. Then it came to the end of the 1980s, and people wanted to close the door on us." John Taylor felt Rio helped the band establish longevity beyond the 1980s, leading to a career spanning 15 albums and more than 100 million record sales. Speaking to Yahoo! Music, he proclaimed: "This is the album that put us on the map — and has kept us there."

=== Retrospective appraisal ===
Professional ratings
Retrospective reviews
Review scores
Source	Rating
AllMusic	(Note: The fourth edition of the All Music Guide: The Definitive Guide to Popular Music (2001) awarded Rio a full five out of five stars. In its print guides, AllMusic used a whole-star rating system, limited to integer values (1–5 stars). On its website, however, it adopted a half-star rating system, allowing intermediate scores such as 3.5 or 4.5 stars. When Rio was later added to the website, its rating was adjusted to four and a half stars out of five, although the accompanying review text remained unchanged. Sometime after 1 October 2025—the date of the latest archived version still showing the four-and-a-half-star rating—the album's score was restored to a full five stars, again without any revision to the review itself.)
Classic Pop	5/5 stars
The Encyclopedia of Popular Music	4/5 stars
Pitchfork	7.3/10
PopMatters	8/10
Q	4/5 stars
Record Collector	3/5 stars
The Rolling Stone Album Guide	4.5/5 stars
Spin Alternative Record Guide	9/10
Uncut	8/10

Critics have retrospectively declared Rio Duran Duran's finest work. (Note: Attributed to multiple references:) Beyond the 2000s, commentators agreed the album has aged well, (Note: Attributed to multiple references:) with AllMusic's Ned Raggett asserting that "its fusion of style and substance ensures that even two decades after its release it remains as listenable and danceable as ever". Zaleski argued that the band's use of basic instrumentation ensured Rio sounded more timeless than other albums of the period. In The Quietus, John Freeman concluded that over 30 years after its release, Rio "encompasses all anyone needs to know about Duran Duran". In 2015, Record Collector's Mark Elliot deemed it a "seminal 80s classic" and a record that displays a band figuring out their sound, growing in confidence and "setting to conquer the world". Chris Ingalls of PopMatters agreed, referring to it as "an iconic statement of its times" and one that rewards repeated listens.

Other reviewers have given praise to the band, with Zaleski arguing that "Rio was a testament to the band's chemistry and ambition, and how quickly they evolved as musicians." Writing for Q magazine, Paul Moody viewed Rio as reinitiating Duran Duran's status as "a national pop treasure". Pitchfork's Tom Ewing, who gave negative assessments to their debut and their follow-up studio album Seven and the Ragged Tiger (1983), stated that Rio "is where the band's hunger for success really catalyzed its mix of rock, disco, and heartthrob pop". Uncut magazine's Wyndham Wallace found the album "confirms [the band] packed a significant punch", while Robbins wrote in Trouser Press:

Rio fulfills the band's potential and its pinnacle, displaying stronger songwriting and far more intricate arrangements. The music's clearly danceable, but brilliantly listenable as well. Le Bon handles tantalizing melodies and obtuse lyrics with confidence, while honestly proficient musicianship by the other four defines each song's character differently. There isn't anything less than good, and "Rio", "Last Chance on the Stairway" and "New Religion" are startling in their melodic excellence.

The band members' performances and instrumentation have been highlighted, with Raggett stating that "the quintet integrates [their] sound near-perfectly throughout". PopMatters' John Bergstrom observed that "not even nearly 30 years of cultural change have been able to budge the careful juxtaposition between Andy Taylor's power riffing and Simon Le Bon's willfully artful lyrics and vocals, or the brilliant interplay between the awesome, seriously funky rhythm section of John Taylor and Roger Taylor, and Nick Rhodes' atmospheric, arpeggiated synthesizer framework. Together, it all created all kinds of energy and just the right amount of camp." Despite its praise, several commentators have taken issue with Le Bon's lyrics, arguing they lack literal meaning and range from "absurd" and "sublime", but agree that the singer's confident vocal performances offer bouts of connotation. (Note: Attributed to multiple references:)

Rio's cover artwork has been deemed iconic and one of the greatest of all time by publications such as Billboard, Rolling Stone and VH1. (Note: Iconic: Best-of lists:) In 2006, Ernest Simpson of Treblezine wrote that with the Clash's London Calling (1979), "rarely does an album cover truly fit the style and attitude within" and Rio's "not only encapsulated the slick new wave of the stylish band, but also the early '80s in general". Reflecting on the artwork in his 2021 book Please Please Tell Me Now, Davis states that the decline of the "classic album art" era began following the release of Rio.

=== Rankings ===
Rio has made appearances on several best-of lists. In 2000, Q magazine placed Rio at number 98 in their list of the 100 Greatest British Albums ever, while The Word ranked it number 24 is a similar list of the 50 best British albums in 2008. Pitchfork named it the 95th best album of the 1980s in 2002. A year later, NME ranked Rio the 65th greatest album of all time. A decade later in 2013, BBC Radio 2 placed it at number three in a list compiling their "Top 100 Favourite Albums of All Time". In lists compiling the best new wave albums, Ultimate Classic Rock and Paste placed it at numbers 4 and 24, respectively. Despite its acclaim, Malins finds that Rio is often not as highly revered as other records of the time, such as ABC's The Lexicon of Love, the Human League's Dare and Simple Minds' New Gold Dream (81–82–83–84).

The album was included in the 2018 edition of Robert Dimery's book 1001 Albums You Must Hear Before You Die.

== Reissues ==
Rio was first released on CD in early 1984 and was one of the first CDs issued by EMI in the UK and the US. The album's first major reissue by EMI was released on 3 July 2001. This release contained Enhanced CD material featuring the music videos for "Rio", "Hungry Like the Wolf" and "Save a Prayer", plus memorabilia and a link to the band's official website. The European limited-edition booklet cover used an alternate version of the Nagel cover painting. The original CD version was used rather than the original LP version, with EMI claiming that it was due to master tape research issues as a result of there being several different versions of the album.

Rio was again reissued as a two-disc Collector's Edition on 7 September 2009 in the UK, and 6 October 2009 in the US. This edition includes the original LP release tracks and the US Kershenbaum remixes, along with several other tracks that were either previously unavailable officially on CD, or were only available on Singles Box Set 1981–1985 (2003). The release was packaged with the Live at Hammersmith '82 DVD, which Record Collector's Joel McIver felt was superior to Rio. This reissue received mixed reviews. Commentators felt the bonus tracks were mostly disposable and not worth the price tag, although some welcome the presence of several "night versions" and the US mixes. Ewing concluded: "The 2xCD package is probably best used as a way of recreating whichever version of Rio floats your nostalgia yacht." On 23 June 2015, Parlophone repackaged this edition as a two-disc set, featuring the US album mixes, demos, assorted B-sides and five remixes.

== Track listing ==
All songs written and arranged by Simon Le Bon, Andy Taylor, John Taylor, Roger Taylor and Nick Rhodes

Side one
No.	Title	Length
1.	"Rio"	5:33
2.	"My Own Way"	4:51
3.	"Lonely in Your Nightmare"	3:50
4.	"Hungry Like the Wolf"	3:41
5.	"Hold Back the Rain"	3:59
Total length:		21:14

Side two
No.	Title	Length
6.	"New Religion"	5:31
7.	"Last Chance on the Stairway"	4:21
8.	"Save a Prayer"	5:33
9.	"The Chauffeur"	5:10
Total length:		20:35

2009 limited edition, remastered edition bonus tracks
No.	Title	Length
10.	"Rio" (US album remix)	5:24
11.	"My Own Way" (Carnival remix)	4:29
12.	"Lonely in Your Nightmare" (US album remix)	4:52
13.	"Hungry Like the Wolf" (US album remix)	4:02
14.	"Hold Back the Rain" (US album remix)	6:29
Total length:		25:16

2009 limited edition, remastered, Disc 2
No.	Title	Length
1.	"Last Chance on the Stairway" (Manchester Square demo, recorded 28th August 1981)	5:04
2.	"My Own Way" (Manchester Square demo, recorded 28th August 1981)	4:38
3.	"New Religion" (Manchester Square demo, recorded 28th August 1981)	5:32
4.	"Like an Angel" (Manchester Square demo, recorded 28th August 1981)	4:59
5.	"My Own Way" (original 7″ version)	3:39
6.	"Like an Angel"	4:41
7.	"Careless Memories" (Live)	4:11
8.	"The Chauffeur (Blue Silver)" (early version)	3:53
9.	"My Own Way" (night version)	6:31
10.	"Hungry Like the Wolf" (night version)	5:11
11.	"Rio" (night version)	6:39
12.	"New Religion" (Carnival version)	5:13
13.	"Hold Back the Rain" (Carnival version)	7:00
Total length:		67:11

=== Notes ===
- The US LP reissue uses the US album remixes of "Rio", "Lonely in Your Nightmare", "Hungry Like the Wolf", and "Hold Back the Rain", along with the Carnival remix of "My Own Way". Later pressings of this reissue use the night version of "Hungry Like the Wolf", mixed by Colin Thurston.
- The original CD and 2001 Enhanced CD reissue use an edit of the video mix of "Lonely in Your Nightmare", a previously unreleased alternate mix of "Hold Back the Rain", and the UK single edit of "Save a Prayer".

== Personnel ==
Album credits adapted from AllMusic:

Duran Duran

- Simon Le Bon – lead vocals, vibraphone on "New Religion", ocarina on "The Chauffeur", marimba on "Last Chance on the Stairway"
- Nick Rhodes – keyboards, synthesisers, sound effects, backing vocals on "Last Chance on the Stairway"
- John Taylor – bass guitar, backing vocals
- Andy Taylor – guitars, backing vocals
- Roger Taylor – drums, percussion

Additional musicians

- Andy Hamilton – tenor saxophone on "Rio"

Production and artwork

- Colin Thurston – production and engineering
- Renate – technician
- Malcolm Garrett – sleeve design
- Patrick Nagel – illustration
- Andy Earl – photography
- David Kershenbaum – remixing (tracks 1–5 on US LP reissue)
- Nick Webb – mastering (UK LP)
- Wally Traugott – mastering (original US LP)
- Stephen Marcussen – mastering (US LP reissue)
- Tony Cousins – remastering (2001 Enhanced CD reissue)
- Steve Rooke – remastering (2009 2-CD Collectors Edition)

== Charts ==
=== Weekly charts ===
Weekly chart performance for Rio
Chart (1982–1983)	Peak position
Australian Albums (Kent Music Report)	3
Canada Top Albums/CDs (RPM)	1
Dutch Albums (Album Top 100)	40
Finnish Albums (Suomen virallinen lista)	3
New Zealand Albums (RMNZ)	2
Norwegian Albums (VG-lista)	13
Swedish Albums (Sverigetopplistan)	9
UK Albums Chart	2
US Billboard Top LPs & Tape	6

2024 weekly chart performance for Rio
Chart (2024)	Peak position
Croatian International Albums (HDU)	6
Hungarian Albums (MAHASZ)	32

=== Year-end charts ===
1982 year-end chart performance for Rio
Chart (1982)	Position
Australian Albums (Kent Music Report)	24
New Zealand Albums (RMNZ)	16
UK Albums (BMRB)	5

1983 year-end chart performance for Rio
Chart (1983)	Position
Canada Top Albums/CDs (RPM)	9
New Zealand Albums (RMNZ)	38
UK Albums (Gallup)	20
US Billboard Top LPs & Tape	13

== Certifications ==
Certifications for Rio
Region	Certification	Certified units/sales
Australia (ARIA)	Platinum	50,000^{^}
Canada (Music Canada)	2× Platinum	200,000^{^}
Finland (Musiikkituottajat)	Gold	30,316
New Zealand (RMNZ)	Platinum	15,000^{^}
United Kingdom (BPI)	Platinum	300,000^{^}
United States (RIAA)	2× Platinum	2,000,000^{^}
^{^} Shipments figures based on certification alone.
