= Save a Prayer =

1982 single by Duran Duran

Single by Duran Duran

from the album Rio
- B-side: "Hold Back the Rain" (remix); "Save a Prayer" (from the Arena); "Careless Memories" (from the Arena)
- Released: 9 August 1982
- Recorded: January–February 1982
- Studio: AIR (London, UK)
- Genre: New wave; synth-pop
- Length: 6:05 (video version); 5:32 (album version); 3:45 (US single version)
- Label: EMI; Capitol
- Songwriters: Simon Le Bon; John Taylor; Roger Taylor; Andy Taylor; Nick Rhodes
- Producer: Colin Thurston

Duran Duran UK singles chronology
"Hungry Like the Wolf" (1982)	"Save a Prayer" (1982)	"Rio" (1982)

Duran Duran US singles chronology
"The Wild Boys" (1984)	"Save a Prayer" (1985)	"A View to a Kill" (1985)

Music video
- "Save a Prayer" on YouTube

"Save a Prayer" is a song by the British pop rock band Duran Duran, released on 9 August 1982 as the third single from their second album Rio (1982). It became Duran Duran's biggest hit (at the time) on the UK singles chart, reaching number two. As of October 2021 "Save a Prayer" is the sixth most streamed Duran Duran song in the UK.

"Save a Prayer" was not initially released as a single in North America, despite the music video's popularity on MTV. An edited version of the original LP track was eventually released as a single in the United States in January 1985, with an edited concert version from the album Arena as the B-side. It reached number 16 on the Billboard Hot 100 chart.

== Composition ==
The song began with Andy Taylor and Nick Rhodes picking out chords together, and was then built around the sequencer track. Simon Le Bon wrote the lyrics to the song while the band was on tour. The lyrics are about a chance meeting between two people that turns into a one-night stand. Le Bon has described the lyrics as "realistic, and not romantic". According to Le Bon, the chorus of the song was based on Gordon Lightfoot's folk song "If You Could Read My Mind".

The verses of the song are in D minor, while the chorus is in B minor. It opens with an arpeggiated delay-treated synthesizer riff (created on a Roland SH-2), which plays in the background throughout the song.

== Critical reception ==
Cash Box said that the live version "attests to the faithful sound of Duran Duran’s show while betraying a certain sedimentary element of the arrangement, the harmonies are there as are the lush backing synthesizers, yet a muddy mix makes the original studio cut favorable."

AllMusic journalist Donald A. Guarisco described the new wave ballad in a retrospective review, as being "a lilting epic". He wrote: "The music maintains the stormily romantic quality of the lyric by combining meditative verses with an aching chorus that swells and ebbs in a way that perfectly captures the song's heartbreak."

Retrospectively, music journalist Annie Zaleski described the song as "a moody ballad driven by lush, pirouetting keyboards and acoustic guitars, and a rhythm section that propelled the song forward with nuanced grooves." She wrote: "Duran Duran's blend of acoustic and electronic is one reason why "Save a Prayer" works so well. It also contributed to the song's success."

Stereogum highlighted the "stunning pop ballad" as one of the band's best tracks, observing "a tension and atmosphere that has echoes of Gentlemen Take Polaroids-era Japan and early OMD".

== Music video ==
The video was filmed by director Russell Mulcahy among the jungles, beaches, and temples of Sri Lanka in April 1982. Scenes were filmed atop the ancient rock fortress of Sigiriya, among the ruins of a Buddhist temple at Polonnaruwa and the island's southern coastline, with Simon Le Bon appearing in Speedos.

Le Bon, Roger and John Taylor went ahead to the location while Andy Taylor and Nick Rhodes were in London finishing mixes for the Rio album and B-sides. They had almost no time after that was done to change clothes before catching their flight, and Rhodes wore the same leather jacket and trousers he had been wearing against the London chill.

When they arrived in Colombo, it was very warm, and Rhodes was uncomfortable in his clothing. Andy reassured him they would be in their hotel soon and could relax. The driver who met them in a flatbed lorry informed them it would be several hours' driving time to Kandy in the centre of the country, where the band were lodged. Along the way they were struck by the poverty they witnessed.

During the filming of the scene where the band members were riding elephants, a female elephant made a strange sound. One of the crew had recorded it, and found it funny enough to play back. It turned out to be the elephant's mating call, which led the elephant carrying Roger to charge downhill and attempt to mount the female. "It was funny as hell, but quite hairy for a moment," says Rhodes.

While perched on a branch over a lagoon and miming playing his guitar, an intoxicated Andy fell into the water. He accidentally swallowed some, and had to be hospitalised during the band's subsequent Australian tour due to a tropical virus he contracted at that time. The band members all initially refused to do the scene where an elephant sprays water from its trunk onto one of them due to its homoerotic overtones; they finally settled on John since he was the band's pin-up boy. He would be teased about it for years afterwards. "I didn't care," he wrote in 2012. "I loved it. It is one of my most treasured memories."

Andy recalls in his memoirs that the shooting at the temple was very tense, since the country was on the verge of civil war and the temple's monks were impatiently waiting for their leader to arrive and address a large political gathering. The band members wore bare feet in deference to the temple's religious importance, frequently scorching themselves on the bare rock they were standing on. During some takes, the band members yelled "Fuck you, Russell!" instead of mouthing the lyrics. For one scene, Le Bon and Rhodes were dropped off from a helicopter that could not itself land on the monument.

Vanya Seager, former wife of Robson Green, is the girl wearing a red dress in an interior-filmed scene dancing with Simon Le Bon. She also appears in the "Lonely in Your Nightmare" music video, which was also filmed in Sri Lanka along with "Hungry Like the Wolf" and "Save a Prayer".

A live version of the song was released in 1985. On the live version Le Bon dedicates the song to Marvin Gaye, who had been fatally shot the day before the concert was recorded in April 1984. The video was taken from Duran Duran's Oakland, California, concerts that were filmed for the Arena (An Absurd Notion) video.

== B-sides, bonus tracks and remixes ==
The UK release of "Save a Prayer" was backed with a remix of "Hold Back the Rain".

=== Versions ===
1. "Save a Prayer" [single version] – 5:24
2. "Save a Prayer" [album version] – 5:33
3. "Save a Prayer" [video version] – 6:03
4. "Save a Prayer" [Australian promo edit] – 4:10
5. "Save a Prayer" [Brazilian edit] – 4:04
6. "Save a Prayer" [US single version] – 3:44
7. "Save a Prayer" [special edited version] – 3:55
8. "Save a Prayer" [Japanese single version] – 4:00

Note: song differences

- Single version: at approximately 4:35 "Save a prayer 'til the morning after" is repeated four times until fade out.
- Album version: at approximately 4:35 "Save a prayer 'til the morning after" is repeated six times until fade out.
- Video version: at approximately 4:41 "Save a prayer 'til the morning after" is repeated twelve times until fade out.
- The synthesizer riff in the video version is repeated 4 times during the intro, while the synthesizer riff on the album and single version gets repeated only twice.

== Formats and track listings ==
7": EMI / EMI 5327 United Kingdom

1. "Save a Prayer" – 5:25
2. "Hold Back the Rain" (remix) – 3:58

12": EMI / 12 EMI 5327 United Kingdom

1. "Save a Prayer" – 5:25
2. "Hold Back the Rain" (12" remix) – 7:05

7": Capitol / B 5438 United States

1. "Save a Prayer" – 3:45 (a.k.a. "US single version")
2. "Save a Prayer" (from the Arena) – 3:35
- Track 2 is an edited version taken from the album Arena.

12": EMI Electrola / 1C K 060 2005036 Europe

1. "Save a Prayer" – 5:25
2. "Save a Prayer" (from the Arena) – 6:11
3. "Careless Memories" (from the Arena) – 4:06
- Tracks 2 and 3 are taken from the album Arena.

7": EMI / EMI 1A 006-64953 The Netherlands

1. "Save a Prayer" – 5:32
2. "Hold Back the Rain" (remix) – 3:56

CD: Part of Singles Box Set 1981–1985

1. "Save a Prayer" (7" edit) – 5:25
2. "Hold Back the Rain" (remix) – 3:56
3. "Hold Back the Rain" (12" remix) – 7:05

== Charts ==
=== Weekly charts ===
Chart (1982)	Peak position
Australia (Kent Music Report)	56
Belgium (Ultratop 50 Flanders)	40
Ireland (IRMA)	2
Israel (IBA)	14
New Zealand (Recorded Music NZ)	35
UK Singles (Official Charts)	2

Edited live version
Chart (1985)	Peak position
Belgium (Ultratop 50 Flanders)	19
Canada Top Singles (RPM)	17
Europe (European Hot 100 Singles)	82
Netherlands (Dutch Top 40)	19
Netherlands (Single Top 100)	17
US Billboard Hot 100	16
US Cash Box Top 100	19
West Germany (GfK)	27

=== Year-end charts ===
Chart (1982)	Position
UK Singles (OCC)	36

== Certifications ==
Certifications for "Save a Prayer"
Region	Certification	Certified units/sales
New Zealand (RMNZ)	Gold	15,000^{‡}
United Kingdom (BPI)	Gold	500,000
^{^} Shipments figures based on certification alone.^{‡} Sales+streaming figures based on certification alone.

== Personnel ==
Duran Duran

- Simon Le Bon – lead vocals, acoustic guitar (live)
- Nick Rhodes – keyboards, synthesizers
- John Taylor – bass guitar, backing vocals
- Roger Taylor – drums
- Andy Taylor – guitar, backing vocals

Technical

- Colin Thurston – producer and engineer

== Other appearances ==
The song appeared in the British TV series Sex Education (season 3, episode 2).

== Cover versions ==
=== Eagles of Death Metal version ===
"Save a Prayer"

Single by Eagles of Death Metal

from the album Zipper Down
- Released: November 2015
- Length: 4:40
- Label: Downtown
- Songwriters: Simon Le Bon; John Taylor; Roger Taylor; Andy Taylor; Nick Rhodes
- Producer: Joshua Homme

Eagles of Death Metal singles chronology
"Complexity" (2015)	"Save a Prayer" (2015)

A cover version of the song appears on Eagles of Death Metal's 2015 album, Zipper Down. Duran Duran and Eagles of Death Metal played the song together on TFI Friday. Following the November 2015 Paris attacks, a Facebook campaign was launched to get the cover of "Save a Prayer" to number 1 on the UK Singles Chart. Duran Duran have stated that they will donate all their royalties from the cover to charity. Eagles of Death Metal's cover ultimately peaked at number 53 for the chart dated the week after the attack.

==== Weekly charts ====
Chart (2015)	Peak position
Belgium (Ultratop 50 Flanders)	5
Belgium (Ultratop 50 Wallonia)	11
France (SNEP)	23
Netherlands (Single Top 100)	73
Scottish Singles Sales (Official Charts)	18
Switzerland (Schweizer Hitparade)	72
UK Singles (Official Charts)	53

=== Other versions ===
In April 2003, British duo 56k released a trance version on Kontor Records, which came out in Germany and other European countries. In the UK, it peaked at #46 and lasted two weeks in the top 100.

In 2014, singer-songwriter David Mead released a cover version of the song on the multi-artist compilation album Here Comes the Reign Again: The Second British Invasion.

In December 2019, Canadian electronic duo Bob Moses released a cover version of the song on their Unplugged EP.

In 2009, British singer-songwriter Kate Walsh released a cover version of the song on her album Peppermint Radio.

In 2015, British house music group Dirty Vegas released a cover version of the song on their "Photograph" album

In 2025, Hooded Menace have included their version on the album, Lachrymose Monuments of Obscuration.

== Sampling ==
- In 1995, British musical duo Shut Up and Dance prominently sampled "Save a Prayer" on their song "Save It 'til the Mourning After". It was released as a single and reached number 25 on the UK Singles Chart in March 1995, becoming the duo's second top-40 hit in the UK. It also reached number 41 on the Dutch Single Top 100, becoming their only song to chart in the Netherlands.
- The opening melody of "Save a Prayer" forms the basis of Viper's 1997 single "Titty Twister".
- "Save a Prayer" is sampled throughout on Cosmic Belt's 2006 single "Do It".
- Will.i.am of the Black Eyed Peas sampled the song on the track "One More Chance", on his 2007 solo album Songs About Girls.
- Arctic Monkeys reference the song's chorus on the track "Teddy Picker", from their 2007 album Favourite Worst Nightmare.
