= Singles Box Set 1981–1985 =

Box set by Duran Duran
- Released: 12 May 2003
- Recorded: 1980–1985
- Length: 186:14
- Label: EMI
- Producers: Duran Duran and various

Duran Duran chronology
Pop Trash (2000)	Singles Box Set 1981–1985 (2003)	The Singles 1986–1995 (2004)

Professional ratings
Review scores
Source	Rating
AllMusic	4/5 stars
The Encyclopedia of Popular Music	3/5 stars
Pitchfork	8.3/10

Singles Box Set 1981–1985 is a box set by the English pop rock band Duran Duran. Consisting of 13 CDs, it was released on 12 May 2003 by EMI and covers the era from Duran Duran (1981) to Arena (1984), as well as the non-studio album single "A View to a Kill" (1985).

Each CD is supposed to be a faithful copy of the UK vinyl single as it was released in the early 1980s, with all of the B-sides and alternate tracks, and each is packaged in a square cardboard sleeve replicating the original artwork. The 13 cardboard sleeves are then packaged in a heavy-duty card box.

The set was reissued on 19 October 2009 as a 3CD jewel cased edition. CD1 contains the tracks from "Planet Earth", "Careless Memories", "Girls on Film", "My Own Way" and "Hungry Like the Wolf". CD2 the tracks from "Save a Prayer", "Rio", "Is There Something I Should Know?" and "Union of the Snake" and CD3 the tracks from "New Moon on Monday", "The Reflex", "The Wild Boys" and "A View to a Kill".

== Track listing ==
The box set comprises the following CD singles:

- CD 1: "Planet Earth" (1981)
1. "Planet Earth" – 4:03
2. "Late Bar" – 2:57
3. "Planet Earth" (night version) – 6:18
- CD 2: "Careless Memories" (1981)
1. "Careless Memories" – 3:44
2. "Khanada" – 3:28
3. "Fame" – 3:17
- CD 3: "Girls on Film" (1981)
1. "Girls on Film" – 3:30
2. "Faster Than Light" – 4:28
3. "Girls on Film" (night version) – 5:29
- CD 4: "My Own Way" (1981)
1. "My Own Way" (single version) – 3:42
2. "Like An Angel" – 4:47
3. "My Own Way" (night version) – 6:36
- CD 5: "Hungry Like the Wolf" (1982)
1. "Hungry Like the Wolf" – 3:31
2. "Careless Memories" (live version) – 4:12
3. "Hungry Like the Wolf" (night version) – 5:11
- CD 6: "Save a Prayer" (1982)
1. "Save a Prayer" (7" edit) – 5:28
2. "Hold Back the Rain" (re-mix) – 4:01
3. "Hold Back the Rain" (12" re-mix) – 7:06
- CD 7: "Rio" (1982)
1. "Rio" (part one) – 5:15
2. "The Chauffeur" (Blue Silver) – 3:50
3. "Rio" (part two) – 5:31
4. "My Own Way" [Carnival remix] – 4:37
- CD 8: "Is There Something I Should Know?" (1983)
1. "Is There Something I Should Know?" – 4:10
2. "Faith in This Colour" – 4:09
3. "Is There Something I Should Know?" (Monster mix) – 6:44
4. "Faith in This Colour" (alternate slow mix) – 4:06
- CD 9: "Union of the Snake" (1983)
1. "Union of the Snake" – 4:24
2. "Secret Oktober" – 2:47
3. "Union of the Snake" (The Monkey mix) – 6:27
- CD 10: "New Moon on Monday" (1984)
1. "New Moon on Monday" (album version) – 4:18
2. "Tiger Tiger" – 3:30
3. "New Moon on Monday" (dance mix) – 6:03
- CD 11: "The Reflex" (1984)
1. "The Reflex" – 4:26
2. "Make Me Smile (Come Up and See Me)" (recorded live at Hammersmith Odeon) – 4:58
3. "The Reflex" (dance mix) – 6:34
- CD 12: "The Wild Boys" (1984)
1. "The Wild Boys" – 4:18
2. "(I'm Looking For) Cracks in the Pavement" ([live] 1984) – 4:10
3. "The Wild Boys" (Wilder Than Wild Boys) (extended mix) – 8:00
- CD 13: "A View to a Kill" (1985)
1. "A View to a Kill" – 3:37
2. "A View to a Kill" (That Fatal Kiss) – 2:31

=== 3-CD edition ===
- CD 1 ("Planet Earth" to "Hungry Like the Wolf")
1. "Planet Earth" – 4:03
2. "Late Bar" – 2:57
3. "Planet Earth" (night version) – 6:18
4. "Careless Memories" – 3:44
5. "Khanada" – 3:28
6. "Fame" – 3:17
7. "Girls on Film" – 3:30
8. "Faster Than Light" – 4:28
9. "Girls on Film" (night version) – 5:29
10. "My Own Way" (single version) – 3:42
11. "Like An Angel" – 4:47
12. "My Own Way" (night version) – 6:36
13. "Hungry Like the Wolf" – 3:31
14. "Careless Memories" (live version) – 4:12
15. "Hungry Like the Wolf" (night version) – 5:11
- CD 2 ("Save a Prayer" to "Union of the Snake")
1. "Save a Prayer" (7" edit) – 5:28
2. "Hold Back the Rain" (re-mix) – 4:01
3. "Hold Back the Rain" (12" re-mix) – 7:06
4. "Rio" (part one) – 5:15
5. "The Chauffeur" (Blue Silver) – 3:50
6. "Rio" (part two) – 5:31
7. "My Own Way" [Carnival remix] – 4:37
8. "Is There Something I Should Know?" – 4:10
9. "Faith in This Colour" – 4:09
10. "Is There Something I Should Know?" (Monster mix) – 6:44
11. "Faith in This Colour" (alternate slow mix) – 4:06
12. "Union of the Snake" – 4:24
13. "Secret Oktober" – 2:47
14. "Union of the Snake" (The Monkey mix) – 6:27
- CD 3 ("New Moon on Monday" to "A View to a Kill")
1. "New Moon on Monday" (album version) – 4:18
2. "Tiger Tiger" – 3:30
3. "New Moon on Monday" (dance mix) – 6:03
4. "The Reflex" – 4:26
5. "Make Me Smile (Come Up and See Me)" (recorded live at Hammersmith Odeon) – 4:58
6. "The Reflex" (dance mix) – 6:34
7. "The Wild Boys" – 4:18
8. "(I'm Looking For) Cracks in the Pavement" ([live] 1984) – 4:10
9. "The Wild Boys" (Wilder Than Wild Boys) (extended mix) – 8:00
10. "A View to a Kill" – 3:37
11. "A View to a Kill" (That Fatal Kiss) – 2:31

== Charts ==
Chart (2003)	Peak position
Italy (FIMI)	42

== Certifications ==
Region	Certification	Certified units/sales
United Kingdom (BPI)	Gold	100,000^{‡}
^{‡} Sales+streaming figures based on certification alone.
