= Patrick Nagel =

American artist (1945-1984)

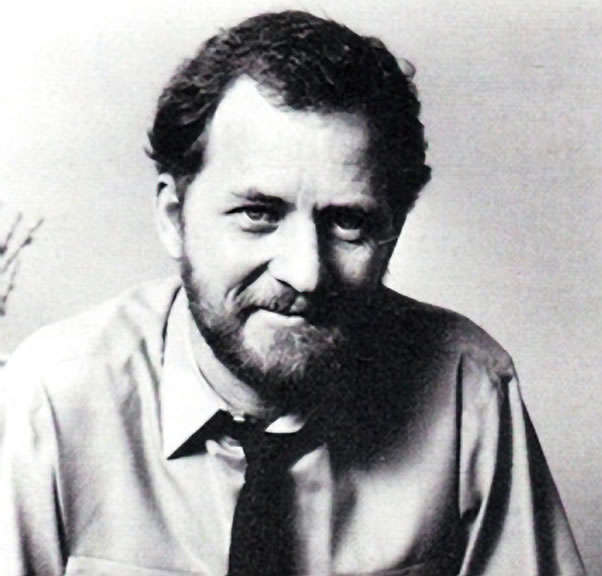
- Born: November 25, 1945; Dayton, Ohio, U.S.
- Died: February 4, 1984 (aged 38); Santa Monica, California, U.S.
- Education: Chouinard Art Institute; California State University, Fullerton
- Known for: Illustration

Patrick Nagel (November 25, 1945 – February 4, 1984) was an American artist and illustrator. He created popular illustrations on board, paper, and canvas, most of which emphasize the female form in a distinctive style, descended from Art Deco and pop art.

He produced many illustrations for Playboy magazine. His cover for the rock group Duran Duran's Rio album has been acclaimed as one of the greatest album covers of all time.

== Early life and education ==
Nagel was born in Dayton, Ohio, on November 25, 1945, but was raised and spent most of his life in the Los Angeles area. After serving in the United States Army with the 101st Airborne Division in Vietnam, Nagel attended the Chouinard Art Institute in Los Angeles in 1969, and in that same year he received his Bachelor of Fine Arts degree from California State University, Fullerton.

== Career ==
=== Illustration and design ===
In 1971, Nagel worked as a graphic designer for ABC Television, producing graphics for promotions and news broadcasts. The following year, he began work as a freelance artist for major corporations and magazines, including Architectural Digest, Harper's Magazine, IBM, ITT Corporation, MGM, Oui, Rolling Stone, United Artists, and Universal Studios.

Nagel produced album covers for recording artists such as Tommy James, Charlene, Thelma Houston and Cissy Houston.

Nagel's 1982 painting for the album cover of rock group Duran Duran's hit album Rio, designed by Malcolm Garrett, became one of his best known images. The model in Nagel's painting has been identified as Marcie Hunt, who featured in a 1981 issue of Vogue Paris. A lithograph of the album cover is part of the collection of MoMA.

He worked for many commercial clients, including Intel, Lucky Strike cigarettes, Ballantine's Whiskey, and Budweiser.

Nagel contributed to Playboy magazine between August 1975 and July 1984, with one of his paintings being published in every issue, most notably in the Playboy Advisor, Playboy Forum and Playboy After Hours columns. This helped to improve his exposure to a wider audience and encouraged the popularity of "the Nagel Woman" image. He created roughly 285 pieces of art work for Playboy during his career. In the early part of his time with Playboy he was given very specific illustration instructions, but that ended sometime between 1977 and 1978; thereafter, Nagel chose his theme and approach and submitted his work for approval before publication. In 1993, roughly nine years after Nagel's death, his widow Jennifer Dumas went into litigation with Playboy over the rights to the artwork published in the magazine. See Playboy Enterprises, Inc. v. Dumas.

=== The Nagel woman ===
In 1977, Nagel made his first poster image for Mirage Editions, with whom he printed many images, his most famous being those of "Nagel women". The "Nagel woman" was developed over time and increased in popularity after Nagel began publishing his work with Playboy in 1975. The women were drawn as "Nagel's ideal woman". His female figures tended to have black hair, and bright white skin. Nagel worked with many models, including Playboy Playmates Cathy St. George, Tracy Vaccaro and Shannon Tweed, and also painted several celebrity portraits, including those of Joan Collins and Joanna Cassidy.

Nagel's portraits were created by tracing a photograph of the subject with Nagel usually making edits to hair and clothing to better match his tastes and style. The source material for much of his work was found objects that included fashion magazine spreads and advertisements. In many cases the original model had no idea it was their image that was used. Model Marcie Hunt, whose image Nagel picked from a Vogue Paris feature, did not know she was used for the cover of Rio until forty-two years later.

There has been much discussion about the inspiration for Nagel's style; since little is known about Nagel's art background, there is no definite answer to this.

Like some of the old print masters (Toulouse-Lautrec and Bonnard, for example), Nagel was influenced by the Japanese woodblock print, with figures silhouetted against a neutral background, with strong areas of black and white, and with bold line and unusual angles of view. He handled colors with rare originality and freedom; he forced perspective from flat, two-dimensional images; and he kept simplifying, working to convey more with fewer elements. His simple and precise imagery is also reminiscent of the art-deco style of the 1920s and 1930s- its sharp linear treatment, geometric simplicity, and stylization of form yield images that are formal yet decorative.

— Elena G. Millie, curator of the poster collection at the Library of Congress,

Art historians have speculated that he may have been influenced by Japanese-style art, but there is no specific evidence for that. His mapmaking experiences in Vietnam possibly did more to steer him into high contrast imagery than anything else.

== Death and legacy ==
=== Death ===
Nagel died February 4, 1984, after participating in a 15-minute celebrity "aerobathon" to raise funds for the American Heart Association in Santa Monica. An autopsy determined his cause of death was a heart attack, and a further autopsy revealed that Nagel had a congenital heart defect that went undetected his entire life. He was survived by his wife, Jennifer Dumas, and his daughter from a previous marriage, Carole Nagel LaVigne. Against his parents' wishes and through no direction attributable to him, Patrick Nagel was cremated and his ashes scattered over the Pacific Ocean.

=== Legacy ===
Nagel's works "capture the emotional state of an era: 1980s American desire, collective materialistic aspiration, a Less than Zero state of mind", said Alex Israel, whom Duran Duran hired to create the album art for their 2015 release Paper Gods, which visually references Nagel's famous Rio cover.

The short-lived cartoon Moonbeam City starring Rob Lowe and Elizabeth Banks based all of its characters on the male and female models of Nagel’s work. Its architectural aesthetic also borrowed from Nagel’s minimalist sensibilities and applied them to the chrome and tile designs of the Memphis Group, which created the predominant deco-influenced style of the 1980s.

=== Art market ===
Nagel prints flooded the market in the 1980s. Nagel's manager, Karl Bornstein, president of Mirage Editions Inc., continued publication of Nagel's works after his death, including open edition prints and mass-market posters. In addition, in 1991, the FBI discovered and dismantled a counterfeiting ring which flooded the market with forged serigraphs. While this contributed to Nagel's cultural ubiquity—Nagel artwork was in a reported two million homes worldwide—it also served to exploit the brand and ultimately, dramatically lowered its value.

By 2019, the market showed signs of a comeback, with one of his original works from 1982 selling for $112,500 at auction, nearly doubling its estimated value, while limited-run silkscreen posters can go for several thousand dollars. Nagel has also had a resurgence in the form of collaborations with mass-market brands. In 2020, fast fashion retailer Forever 21 launched an apparel collection featuring Nagel portraits.
