= Patrick Nagel (footballer) =

German footballer

Personal information
- Date of birth: 6 August 1990 (age 36)
- Place of birth: West Germany
- Height: 1.79 m (5 ft 10 in)
- Position: Defender

Team information
- Current team: PSV Union Neumünster
- Number: 30

Youth career
- TuS Garbek
- –2004: Eintracht Segeberg
- 2004–2009: Hamburger SV

Senior career*
Years	Team	Apps	(Gls)
2009–2011	Holstein Kiel	7	(0)
2009–2011	Holstein Kiel II	33	(4)
2011–2012	SV Todesfelde	28	(4)
2012–2015	VfR Neumünster	71	(2)
2015–	PSV Union Neumünster	54	(4)
- * Club domestic league appearances and goals as of 22:00, 27 September 2017 (UTC)

Patrick Nagel (born 6 August 1990) is a German footballer who plays as a defender for PSV Union Neumünster.
