= Rio (song) =

1982 song by Duran Duran

- UK 12-inch single picture sleeve

Single by Duran Duran

from the album Rio
- B-side: "The Chauffeur (Blue Silver)" (UK); "Hold Back the Rain" (US); "My Own Way" (UK 12-inch single)
- Released: August 1982; 1 November 1982 (UK)
- Studio: AIR (London)
- Genre: Synth-pop; synth-rock; new wave
- Length: 5:33 (album version); 4:40 (single version); 5:11 (part 1); 5:29 (part 2); 4:34 (US single version); 3:57 (US single remix); 5:03 (video version)
- Label: EMI (UK); Harvest, Capitol (US)
- Songwriters: Simon Le Bon; John Taylor; Roger Taylor; Andy Taylor; Nick Rhodes
- Producer: Colin Thurston

Duran Duran UK singles chronology
"Save a Prayer" (1982)	"Rio" (1982)	"Is There Something I Should Know?" (1983)

Duran Duran US singles chronology
"Hungry Like the Wolf" (1982)	"Rio" (1982)	"Is There Something I Should Know?" (1983)

Music video
- "Rio" on YouTube

"Rio" is a song by the English pop rock band Duran Duran from their second studio album, Rio (1982). It was first released as a single in Australia, in August 1982, followed by a UK release on 1 November 1982.

The song was the fourth and final single lifted from the band's second studio album of the same name and was edited for its release. It was issued worldwide in October 1982 and became a Top 10 hit in the UK Singles Chart, peaking at number 9 on 11 December 1982. As of October 2021, "Rio" is the third most streamed Duran Duran song in the UK.

"Rio" was released as the third single from the album in Australia, and debuted on the Kent Music Report top 100 singles chart dated 6 September 1982. The song did not attract much notice in the United States upon its initial global release but received early airplay at KROQ-FM in Los Angeles as early as 2 August 1982. After the band's breakthrough hit "Hungry Like the Wolf" found success in the American charts in December 1982, Capitol Records reissued the single in March 1983 to be the band's second US top 20 hit, peaking at number 14.

== Production ==
The song originated from an idea by John Taylor about Rio de Janeiro – "the truly foreign, the exotic, a cornucopia of earthly delights, a party that would never stop"; Simon Le Bon wrote the lyrics to the song, and chose not to write about the city but about a girl named Rio. Its verses were inspired by their earlier song "See Me, Repeat Me" and the chorus was taken from "Stevie's Radio Station", a song written by the band TV Eye, featuring lead vocalist Andy Wickett, who went on to be one of Duran Duran's early lead vocalists. The song was a favourite of Nick and John and was incorporated into Duran Duran live sets during Wickett's tenure.

Nick Rhodes created the sound at the beginning of the song by throwing several small metal rods onto the strings of a grand piano in the studio. The recorded sound was then reversed to create the intro. Rhodes produced the synthesiser lead using the arpeggiator on a Roland Jupiter-4 set to random while playing a Cmaj^{7} chord. The tenor saxophone solo was performed by Andy Hamilton. The laughter on the track was that of Rhodes's girlfriend at the time.

== Critical reception ==
Cash Box called it "a perfect follow-up to 'Hungry Like The Wolf'", saying that "the melody's warm sea breeze contrasts effectively with the menace in 'Wolf' and is equally catchy."

== Music video ==
Director Russell Mulcahy filmed the music video for "Rio", which featured images of the band in Antony Price suits, singing and playing around on a yacht speeding over the crystal blue Caribbean Sea. The yacht in the music video was the Eilean. Short segments show band members trying to live out their assorted daydreams while being teased by a body-painted woman, played by Reema Ruspoli.

The music video was shot over the course of three days in May 1982 on the island of Antigua. The yacht scenes were filmed on the bay at English Harbour, the beach scenes at Miller's Beach, and the segment featuring the raft at Shirley Heights. Some close ups were filmed later on the Solent due to a film processing error.

Director Mulcahy originally planned a scene where the band members got chased off the island by people wielding guns, but did not have enough film stock left to shoot this. He had to borrow a tourist's camera to shoot the part of John Taylor playing a saxophone on a mountaintop. When the video was featured on VH1's Pop-Up Video, it mentions that after the video was completed, Mulcahy, Le Bon, and Taylor went for a swim and were inches away from sharks when the yacht captain yelled for them to get out of the water. Rhodes was reportedly seasick during the filming, and has often said "I hate boats unless they're tied up and you're having cocktails on them."

While in Antigua, the band also filmed a video for the album track "Night Boat", which appeared with "Rio" and nine other videos on the Duran Duran video album released in 1983.

== B-sides, bonus tracks and remixes ==
There are 13 different official mixes of "Rio", many of which are edits of the album version or Kershenbaum remix with fades in various places.

The B-side of the November 1982 original United Kingdom single was "The Chauffeur (Blue Silver)", an acoustic version of the album track. The B-side of the April 1983 reissue in the United States was an upbeat remix of "Hold Back the Rain". The B-side of the 12-inch single included a remix of "My Own Way".

== Personnel ==
- Simon LeBon: lead vocals
- Nick Rhodes: keyboards and synthesizers
- Andy Taylor: guitar and background vocals
- John Taylor: bass and background vocals
- Roger Taylor: drums, percussion

Additional musician

- Andy Hamilton: saxophone

== Formats and track listings ==
7-inch: EMI / EMI 5346 United Kingdom

1. "Rio" – 4:40
2. "The Chauffeur (Blue Silver)" – 3:48
- Track 1 is the "single version".
- Track 2 is the "early version", and is a shorter acoustic version of the moody album track.

7-inch: EMI / EMI 5346 United Kingdom

1. "Rio" – 5:11
2. "The Chauffeur (Blue Silver)" – 3:48
- Track 1 is "Rio" (part 1).

Note:

Two different versions of this single were available in the UK, both with identical sleeves and labels.

12-inch: EMI / 12 EMI 5346 United Kingdom

1. "Rio" (part 2) – 5:29
2. "Rio" (part 1) – 5:11
3. "My Own Way" – 4:34 (a.k.a. "Carnival remix")

7": Harvest / B-5175 United States (1982)

1. "Rio" (US single version) – 4:34
2. "Hold Back the Rain" (album version) – 3:59

7": Capitol / B-5215 United States (1983 reissue)

1. "Rio" (US single remix) – 3:57
2. "Hold Back the Rain" (US album remix) – 6:32

CD: Part of Singles Box Set 1981–1985

1. "Rio" (part 1) – 5:11
2. "The Chauffeur (Blue Silver)" – 3:48
3. "Rio" (part 2) – 5:29
4. "My Own Way" (Carnival remix) – 4:34

== Charts ==
=== Weekly charts ===
Chart (1982–1983)	Peak position
Australia (Kent Music Report)	60
Canada Top Singles (RPM)	3
Finland (Suomen virallinen lista)	14
Ireland (IRMA)	9
Israel (IBA)	19
Netherlands (Single Tip)	28
New Zealand (Recorded Music NZ)	36
UK Singles (Official Charts)	9
US Billboard Hot 100	14
US Mainstream Rock (Billboard)	5
US Cash Box Top 100	14

=== Year-end charts ===
Chart (1983)	Position
Canada Top Singles (RPM)	37
US Cash Box	94
US Joel Whitburn's Pop Annual	104

== Certifications ==
Region	Certification	Certified units/sales
United Kingdom (BPI)	Gold	400,000^{‡}
^{‡} Sales+streaming figures based on certification alone.

== Covers, samples and media references ==
It has been referenced in the lyrics of the 2005 UK number one hit by Arctic Monkeys, "I Bet You Look Good on the Dancefloor": "Your name isn't Rio, but I don't care for sand".

CSS collaborated with Simon Le Bon and John Taylor to record a cover of the song in 2016.

The song was recreated by Moby for the compilation album Making Patterns Rhyme (2014).

=== Nicole Scherzinger version ===
"Rio"

Single by Nicole Scherzinger
- Released: August 2008
- Genre: Pop
- Length: 3:39
- Label: A&M; Interscope
- Songwriter: Duran Duran
- Producers: Ron Fair; J. R. Rotem; Ben H. Allen

Nicole Scherzinger singles chronology
"Puakenikeni" (2008)	"Rio" (2008)	"Nobody Can Change Me" (2010)

Nicole Scherzinger recorded a cover version of "Rio" as a promotion for Caress Brazilian body wash from Unilever. The song was released to radio on 28 July 2008 and as a CD single in August 2008. The music video shows Scherzinger performing in a pink dress in front of a crowd, with flowers appearing all around her as she sings on stage.

Of the cover, Duran Duran singer Simon Le Bon said, "When we were first approached about Nicole doing a version of "Rio" for this campaign, we thought it was the perfect fit. She's exotic and beautiful and embodies everything that inspired the original version. Because it's one of our signature songs very few people have covered it over the years, so it has been great for us to hear a new interpretation."

=== Track listings ===
Two-track CD single

1. "Rio" (Caress Brazilian mix)
2. "Rio" (Caress Brazilian mix) (instrumental)

CD single maxi jewelcase

1. "Rio" (Caress Brazilian mix)
2. "Rio" (Caress Brazilian mix) (instrumental)
3. "Rio" (dance remix)
4. "Rio" (video)
5. The making of the "Rio" (Caress Brazilian mix) video
