= Hungry Like the Wolf =

1982 song by Duran Duran

- Cover art for UK editions

Single by Duran Duran

from the album Rio
- B-side: "Careless Memories" (live)
- Released: 4 May 1982
- Recorded: Early 1982
- Studio: AIR (London)
- Genre: New wave; synth-pop; dance-rock
- Length: 3:41 (UK LP version and video version); 3:23 (single version); 4:11 (US album remix); 5:14 (night version)
- Label: EMI; Harvest; Capitol
- Songwriters: Nick Rhodes; Simon Le Bon; John Taylor; Roger Taylor; Andy Taylor
- Producer: Colin Thurston

Duran Duran UK singles chronology
"My Own Way" (1981)	"Hungry Like the Wolf" (1982)	"Save a Prayer" (1982)

Duran Duran US singles chronology
"Girls on Film" (1981)	"Hungry Like the Wolf" (1982)	"Rio" (1982)

Music video
- "Hungry Like the Wolf" on YouTube

"Hungry Like the Wolf" is a song by the English pop rock band Duran Duran. Written by the band members, the song was produced by Colin Thurston for the group's second studio album, Rio (1982).

The music video for "Hungry Like the Wolf" was directed by Russell Mulcahy and filmed in Sri Lanka. Although the band initially failed to break into the US market, MTV placed the "Hungry Like the Wolf" video into heavy rotation.

Subsequently, the group gained much exposure; the song peaked at the No. 3 spot on the Billboard Hot 100 in March 1983, and Duran Duran became an international sensation.

The video won the first Grammy Award for Best Short Form Music Video in 1984.

The 2015 song "Hey Everybody!" by 5 Seconds of Summer contains elements from "Hungry Like the Wolf", and Duran Duran were given a writing credit on the song.

== Writing and recording ==
"Hungry Like the Wolf"
A 24-second sample from "Hungry Like the Wolf", featuring Rhodes' girlfriend's laugh at the beginning, Le Bon's vocals with a backing track that mixes a Roland TR-808 drum machine, and a Roland Jupiter-8, and the repeating of the word "do" at the end.

"Hungry Like the Wolf" was written and recorded on a Saturday in the spring of 1982, at the basement studios of EMI's London headquarters. The song was built throughout the day as each band member arrived, and by the evening it was essentially complete.

"That track came from fiddling with the new technology that was starting to come in", guitarist Andy Taylor said in an interview with Blender magazine.

Rhodes came up with an idea for the backing track in the car while he was going to the studio. He started playing with the Roland Jupiter-8 keyboard, while lead vocalist Simon Le Bon was working with the lyrics. The lyrics were inspired by Little Red Riding Hood, and the repeating of the word "do" at the end of each verse takes its melody from the instrumentals in Gordon Lightfoot's song "If You Could Read My Mind".

Andy Taylor worked out a Marc Bolan-ish guitar part, a very Marshall-sounding Les Paul guitar lick that was added to the track. The bass and drums were then added, and the whole track was finished that day, including Le Bon's vocal melody and lyrics.

The laugh at the beginning of the song and the moans during the song's fade-out were performed and recorded live by Rhodes' girlfriend at the time.

The group re-recorded the song for the Rio album a few months later at London's AIR Studios with producer Colin Thurston, who also co-produced the hit "Too Shy" for Kajagoogoo.

Andy Taylor remembers: "He was a great organizer and arranger, we gave him far more ideas and music than the track actually needed, and he was important in the process of whittling them down to the essential elements." Thurston and the band decided to keep the demo's original electronic backing track and just re-record the other instruments and vocals.

John Taylor has stated that he "[doesn't] really know" what the lyrics mean, speculating that the song is probably about "meeting girls" and/or "wanting to have sex with someone".

== Critical reception ==
Upon its release in May 1982 it received a poor reception in Smash Hits magazine. "This seems curiously lifeless even by their own standards", reviewer Dave Rimmer wrote, "The wolf of the title appears to be a character who hunts women. Charming."

Retrospectively, it has been praised as one of Duran Duran's best songs. In a 2003 review of the Singles Box Set 1981–1985, Rob Mitchum of Pitchfork Media said that "singles don't come much stronger than 'Hungry Like the Wolf'", praising its "bubbly keys around a slashing guitar riff", adding that the song "show[s] off how Duran Duran was a band, not just a synthesizer".

Jon Pareles from The New York Times said the song "put an oblique, sometimes apocalyptic spin on pop romance in the verses but kept the choruses clear and catchy, never disguising their pop intentions", adding that the "posing was always a little preposterous, but no less enjoyable for that."

AllMusic's Ned Raggett said the song "blended a tight, guitar-heavy groove with electronic production and a series of instant hooks", adding that it was one of Rio's "biggest smashes" that "open[ed] the door in America for the New Romantic/synth rock crossover".

Stewart Mason, also from AllMusic, called "Hungry Like the Wolf" a "spectacular pop single" and "the finest song Duran Duran ever wrote", adding that it was a "much more kinetic and exciting song than earlier flop singles like 'Planet Earth'." In 2024, The Guardian music journalist Alexis Petridis ranked it Duran Duran's third best song, writing: "The appealingly cocky sound of a band intent on conquering America, certain they know how to do it. Hungry Like the Wolf has been polished until virtually every sound on it feels like a hook: the synth arpeggio, the guitar riff, the verses that sound like choruses, the spoken-word asides."

In 2006, VH1 ranked "Hungry Like the Wolf" No. 3 on its list of the "100 Greatest Songs of the ‘80s". In 2021, Rolling Stone listed the song at No. 398 on "the 500 Greatest Songs of All Time", and in 2022, at No. 5 on their list "100 Best Songs of 1982".

== Music video ==
Lead vocalist Simon Le Bon, and the tiger-like woman screaming at each other, in the middle of the Sri Lankan jungle.

In 1982, music video director Russell Mulcahy, who had directed the band's first video, "Planet Earth", was brought back to make the music video for "Hungry Like the Wolf" and two other songs for the band's 1983 video album. The band had a vision of jungles and exotic women, and Mulcahy suggested Sri Lanka, a country he had just visited. EMI spent $200,000 to send the group to Sri Lanka; the band made a stopover there in April, en route to a scheduled Australian tour. Keyboardist Nick Rhodes and guitarist Andy Taylor remained behind to finish the mixing of the Rio album while the rest of the band began filming the video; they flew straight to Sri Lanka after handing over the final masters to EMI.

As it was described in the pop culture book The 1980s, the video was lush and cinematic, with shots of jungles, rivers, elephants, cafes and marketplaces evoking the atmosphere of the film Raiders of the Lost Ark (1981).

Andy Taylor, who contracted a stomach virus serious enough to require hospitalisation from accidentally drinking water in the lagoon during the shoot, describes the storyline as "Indiana Jones is horny and wants to get laid."

In the video, lead vocalist Simon Le Bon's head rises in slow motion out of the river as rain pours down, evoking a scene in Apocalypse Now (1979).

He then chases a tiger-like woman played by Bermuda model Sheila Ming-Burgess, from open markets in the city through obstacles in the jungle.

During the chase, Le Bon has his face mopped by a young boy and overturns a bar room table, culminating in a final chase and struggle in a jungle clearing, which is sexually suggestive. In the meantime, the other band members hunt for Le Bon.

Less than two months after the shoot of the video, the fledgling American cable television network MTV put "Hungry Like the Wolf" into heavy rotation, playing it four times a day.

The exposure eventually helped propel the single into the top 5 of the Billboard Hot 100, and the Rio album into the top 10 of the albums chart.

Les Garland, senior executive vice-president of MTV, said: "I remember our director of talent and artist relations came running in and said, 'You have got to see this video that's come in.' Duran Duran were getting zero radio airplay at the time, and MTV wanted to try to break new music.

'Hungry Like the Wolf' was the greatest video I'd ever seen." MTV named "Hungry Like the Wolf" the 15th most-played video of the network, and was 11th on the century-end MTV "100 Greatest Videos Ever Made". It won the Grammy Award for Best Short Form Music Video at the 26th Grammy Awards in February 1984, making it the first video to ever win that award.

In 2001, VH1 rated it 31st on the "VH1: 100 Greatest Videos".

== Commercial performance ==
"Hungry Like the Wolf" was released in the United Kingdom on 4 May 1982 the next week the song debuted at No. 35 on the UK Singles Chart, and six weeks later it reached its peak at No. 5, remaining six weeks in the top 10, and 12 weeks in total. The release of the single helped Rio reach No. 2 on the albums chart.

In Ireland, the single entered the chart on 23 May 1982 and reached No. 4 on the Irish Singles Chart, becoming the band's first top-10 hit in that country.

Despite achieving commercial success with several top hits in the United Kingdom, the band failed to enter in the US market. Their debut studio album did not chart and failed to yield a hit single. "Hungry Like the Wolf" was released in the United States on 7 June 1982 but did not chart.

At first, US radio were reluctant to play the song, but influential stations such as KROQ in Los Angeles championed the band, hosting an in-person artist album signing at a Licorice Pizza in Canoga Park, California, to build support for the act.

On the first day of New York-based WLIR's run as a modern-rock station, "Hungry Like the Wolf" aired in morning drive, with John DeBella as host. It gained national popularity, however, only when the newly emerging MTV began playing the accompanying music video in heavy rotation; the exposure pushed "Hungry Like the Wolf" onto AOR playlists.

The song entered Billboard's Hot Mainstream Rock Tracks chart in August 1982 and reached the top of the chart in January 1983.

Following the release of the Carnival EP in September and the David Kershenbaum remaster of Rio in November, the Kershenbaum remix of "Hungry Like the Wolf" was released as a single on 3 December 1982.

Hungry Like the Wolf entered the Billboard Hot 100 on 25 December 1982 at number 77, peaking at No. 3 on 26 March 1983, and remaining 23 weeks on the chart.

Ten years later, in March 1993, the single was certified gold by the Recording Industry Association of America (RIAA). In Canada, the song debuted at No. 48 on the RPM singles chart on 22 January 1983, reaching the top of the chart for one week on 19 March 1983, staying on the chart for 19 weeks, and ending in the 10th position of the 1983 year-end chart. It was certified gold by the Canadian Recording Industry Association (CRIA) in April 1983.

"Hungry Like the Wolf" remains one of Duran Duran's most popular songs and a fan favourite. As of October 2021, it was the band's most streamed song in the UK, with 40.4 million streams.

== Role in the trial of Diane Downs ==
"Hungry Like the Wolf" was a key element in the trial of Diane Downs, who was accused of shooting her three children on 19 May 1983, on an isolated road in Oregon. Downs said a stranger attempted to carjack her and shot her children.

Downs's daughter, Cheryl, 7, died as a result of the injuries; Danny, aged 3, was paralyzed from the waist down; Christie, 8, had suffered a disabling stroke.

"Hungry Like the Wolf" was reportedly a favorite song of Downs, and Ann Rule later wrote that Christie remembered the song playing during the shooting.

The song was played for jurors during the trial, and Downs unnerved spectators as she mouthed the words and gently bobbed along to the music. Author Ann Rule wrote in her book Small Sacrifices, Christie has one remarkably clear memory. She was positive that the tape was still playing, even as the shots were fired. Hungry Like the Wolf wailed inside the car, keening lyrics of thwarted lust." Lead prosecutor Fred Hugi believed the song "had given Diane the courage to do whatever she had to do to get [her lover] back," Rule wrote. In 1984, Downs was convicted of one count of murder, two counts of attempted murder, and two counts of criminal assault and sentenced to life in prison with the possibility of parole after twenty-five years.

== Formats and track listings ==
7": EMI – EMI 5295; United Kingdom

1. "Hungry Like the Wolf" (single version) – 3:27
2. "Careless Memories" (live) – 4:11 (recorded live at Hammersmith Odeon, London, 17 December 1981)

12": EMI – 12 EMI 5295; United Kingdom

1. "Hungry Like the Wolf" (night version) – 5:14
2. "Careless Memories" (live) – 4:11 (recorded live at Hammersmith Odeon, London, 17 December 1981)

7": Harvest – B 5134; United States

1. "Hungry Like the Wolf" (130 B.P.M. single version) – 3:23
2. "Careless Memories" (live) – 4:11 (recorded live at Hammersmith Odeon, London, 17 December 1981)
- Initial US release

7": Harvest – B 5195; United States

1. "Hungry Like the Wolf" (night version) – 5:14
2. "Hungry Like the Wolf" (US album remix) – 4:11
- US re-release
- Track 2 remixed by David Kershenbaum

CD: Part of Singles Box Set 1981–1985

1. "Hungry Like the Wolf" (single version) – 3:27
2. "Careless Memories" (live) – 4:11 (recorded live at Hammersmith Odeon, London, 17 December 1981)
3. "Hungry Like the Wolf" (129 B.P.M. night version) – 5:09

CD: Part of Rio (2009 Limited Edition) (CD1)

1. "Hungry Like the Wolf" (US album remix) – 4:11

CD: Part of Rio (2009 Limited Edition) (CD2)

1. "Hungry Like the Wolf" (129 B.P.M. night version) – 5:09

== Personnel ==
- Simon Le Bon – lead vocals
- Nick Rhodes – keyboards
- John Taylor – bass guitar, background vocals
- Roger Taylor – drums, percussion
- Andy Taylor – lead guitar, background vocals
- Colin Thurston – producer and engineer
- David Kershenbaum – remixing

== Charts ==
=== Weekly charts ===
Weekly chart performance for "Hungry Like the Wolf"
Chart (1982–1983)	Peak position
Australia (Kent Music Report)	5
Canada Retail Singles (The Record)	2
Canada (RPM 50 Singles)	1
Netherlands (Dutch Top 40 Tipparade)	15
Netherlands (Single Top 100)	50
Ireland (IRMA)	4
Israel (IBA)	2
New Zealand (Recorded Music NZ)	4
South African Chart	4
Spain Airplay (Top 40 Radio)	31
UK Singles (Official Charts)	5
US Billboard Hot 100	3
US Billboard Hot Dance Club Play	36
US Billboard Top Rock Tracks	1

=== Year-end charts ===
Year-end chart performance for "Hungry Like the Wolf"
Chart (1982)	Position
Australia (Kent Music Report)	32
Israel (IBA)	27
New Zealand (Recorded Music NZ)	49

Chart (1983)	Position
Canada	10
US Billboard Hot 100	17

== Certifications ==
Certifications and sales for "Hungry Like the Wolf"
Region	Certification	Certified units/sales
Canada (Music Canada)	Gold	50,000^{^}
New Zealand (RMNZ)	2× Platinum	60,000^{‡}
United Kingdom (BPI)	Platinum	600,000^{‡}
United States (RIAA)	Gold	500,000^{^}
^{^} Shipments figures based on certification alone.^{‡} Sales+streaming figures based on certification alone.
