= My Own Way (song) =

Single by Duran Duran
- B-side: "Like an Angel"
- Released: 16 November 1981
- Recorded: October 1981
- Studio: Townhouse (London)
- Genre: Funk-pop
- Length: 3:39 (single version); 3:43 (Brazilian edit); 4:49 (album version); 6:34 (night version)
- Label: EMI; Capitol
- Songwriters: Simon Le Bon; John Taylor; Roger Taylor; Andy Taylor; Nick Rhodes
- Producer: Colin Thurston

Duran Duran UK singles chronology
"Girls on Film" (1981)	"My Own Way" (1981)	"Hungry Like the Wolf" (1982)

Music video
- "My Own Way" on YouTube

"My Own Way" is the fourth single by the English pop rock band Duran Duran, originally released on 16 November 1981.

The single was a follow up to the UK top 5 hit "Girls on Film", and was another hit, peaking at #14 on the UK singles chart and at #10 in Australia. Despite its success, the single has often been cited by the band as one of their least favourite and is rarely played live.

== Background ==
The single release of "My Own Way" has a fast tempo and "disco strings" arranged by Richard Myhill and Duran Duran.

A slower version was later recorded for the Rio album, with slightly different lyrics. This version dispensed with the disco strings in favour of a new wave style with echoing synths and was later remixed by David Kershenbaum for the Carnival EP, and this altered track appeared on the American re-issue of the Rio album on vinyl and cassette late in 1982. All CD pressings of Rio have used the original UK album mix.

== Music video ==
The video for "My Own Way" was directed by Russell Mulcahy, who also directed several other videos for Duran Duran.

== B-sides ==
The B-side of the UK 7-inch was "Like an Angel". The B-side of the UK 12-inch was "Like an Angel" and the "night" version of "My Own Way".

=== Versions and remixes ===
- Manchester Square demo (4:38) – recorded on 12 December 1980, this version saw official release on the expanded 2009 rerelease of the Rio album.
- Single version (3:40) – the original commercially released recording, from October 1981
- Night version (6:32) – the UK 12-inch version. Owing to the lack of sampling technology at the time, the 7-inch backing track was copied and the tape physically spliced to extend it, then fresh overdubs were added.
- Instrumental version (6:32) – the night version, minus the vocals. Initially appearing on a UK promo 12-inch, it was made available as a download-only supplement to the 2009 Rio re-release.
- UK album version (4:49) – completely rerecorded during the Rio album sessions, in early 1982
- Brazilian edit (3:42) – the UK album version, faded just over a minute early. It appeared on the Brazil-only Rio 7-inch EP.
- Carnival EP/US album remix 4:31 – the UK album version, remixed by David Kershenbaum for the US market. This version also appeared on the B-side of the UK Rio 12-inch, labelled simply "remix" and with a 5-second longer fade.

== Formats and track listings ==
=== 7": EMI / EMI 5254 United Kingdom ===
1. "My Own Way" (single version) – 3:39
2. "Like an Angel" – 4:41

=== 12": EMI / 12 EMI 5254 United Kingdom ===
1. "My Own Way" (night version) – 6:31
2. "Like an Angel" – 4:41
3. "My Own Way" (short version) – 3:39

=== CD: Part of Singles Box Set 1981–1985 ===
1. "My Own Way" (short version) – 3:39
2. "Like an Angel" – 4:41
3. "My Own Way" (night version) – 6:31

=== CD: Part of Rio (2009 Collectors Edition) ===
1. "My Own Way" (Carnival remix) – 4:29

=== CD: Part of Rio (2009 Collectors Edition) (digital download/streaming) ===
1. "My Own Way" (instrumental) – 6:35

== Charts ==
=== Weekly charts ===
Weekly chart performance for "My Own Way"
Chart (1981–1982)	Peak position
Australia (Kent Music Report)	10
Ireland (IRMA)	20
Israel (IBA)	12
New Zealand (Recorded Music NZ)	12
Spain Airplay (Top 40 Radio)	32
UK Singles (Official Charts)	14

=== Year-end charts ===
Year-end chart performance for "My Own Way"
Chart (1982)	Position
Australia (Kent Music Report)	80

== Covers and samples ==
In 2002, "My Own Way" was sampled by José Nunez, American music remixer and producer, for the dance song "Air Race", which became a sizeable club and airplay hit.

== Personnel ==
Duran Duran

- Simon Le Bon – vocals
- Nick Rhodes – keyboards
- John Taylor – bass guitar
- Roger Taylor – drums
- Andy Taylor – guitar

Technical

- Colin Thurston – producer and engineer
- Renate – technician
- Peter Saville, Peter Saville Associates, Manchester and Malcolm Garrett, Assorted iMaGes, London – sleeve design
- Arranged by (strings) – Duran Duran and Richard Myhill
