= Carnival (Duran Duran EP) =

EP by Duran Duran
- Released: September 1982
- Recorded: 1980–1982
- Genre: Dance; new wave
- Length: Various
- Label: EMI
- Producer: Colin Thurston

Duran Duran chronology
Rio (1982)	Carnival (1982)	Seven and the Ragged Tiger (1983)

Carnival is a dance music EP by British band Duran Duran, originally released in various markets around the world in September 1982 by EMI.

== Background ==
As part of Capitol's shift in marketing strategy for Duran Duran to develop into a dance band over the course of 1982 (in a bid to ship more units of the Rio album), it was decided to release an EP of remixed tracks in various territories globally to capitalise on increased night-club play and to try to replicate that success on radio.

Part of this strategy also involved producer David Kershenbaum remixing various Rio tracks. Most of these remixes also appeared on the Carnival release as well as various twelve-inch singles.

The demand for Duran Duran material during the autumn of 1982 was quite high. DJs who heard the new mixes could not get enough, and started to put the dance mixes on the air. During the week of 2 October, the US version of the Carnival EP actually entered the album charts at #98. It was gone by the following week.

The success of the Carnival EP gave the band enough clout to bring Kershenbaum back in to remix the entire A-side of the Rio album, which was duly released in the US in November 1982.

== The songs and releases ==
Because Carnival was meant to capitalise on Duran Duran's burgeoning dance-oriented success, the track listing around the world differed from region to region.

=== Dutch and Spanish EP ===
The Dutch EP, released in a white sleeve with photos taken from the Rio tour book, featured twelve-inch versions – or "Night Versions" in early Duran Duran parlance – lifted from four of the band's more popular singles – "Hungry Like the Wolf", "Rio", "Planet Earth" and "Girls on Film". A rare misprint of the Dutch sleeve is existing, stating "Hold Back the Rain" to be included instead of "Planet Earth".

The Night version of "Girls on Film" is actually slightly different from the version that appeared on the EMI twelve-inch single, clocking in at just around 15 seconds longer. Also, the David Kershenbaum Night version mix of "Rio" was commercially exclusive to this EP (it also featured on an American promo twelve-inch), as the "Rio" twelve-inch single featured "Rio (Pt II)" as the lead mix.

The Spanish EP featured, on the sleeve at least, the same running order as the Dutch EP. Closer inspection however, shows that the version of "Rio" is actually just the album version, although it's listed as the Night version. The song titles on the Spanish release were all translated into Spanish.

=== Canada and US ===
For the Canada and US releases the track listing changed slightly, incorporating among other things, a new Kershenbaum mix of minor single "My Own Way" which featured additional lyrics left off the original album version as well as the 'rhythm section punched up, making it ideal for dancing'. This mix eventually resurfaced on the Kershenbaum version of the Rio album in November 1982.

The EP also featured an extended version of album track "Hold Back the Rain" remixed by David Kershenbaum, which is quite similar to the version on the B-side of the "Save a Prayer" twelve-inch single. However the guitars are more prominent on the EP mix, and the keyboard and bass are quieter in some places. This mix also featured on the Japanese Carnival EP.

The US and Canada track listings are rounded out by Night versions of singles "Hungry Like the Wolf" and "Girls on Film", lifted directly from their respective twelve-inches. Looks-wise, the EP was similar to the Dutch release but came in a purple sleeve, instead of white.

=== Japan/Taiwan ===
The Japanese/Taiwanese release of Carnival included among the increasingly easy to acquire versions of previous singles a remix exclusive to this release of fan-favourite album track "New Religion". This mainly instrumental mix remained unavailable outside Japan/Taiwan until the 1999 release of the Strange Behaviour remix album.

The remainder of the EP was filled with the 5:02 Full 7" mix of "Rio", (mislabelled as the 5:31 "Rio (Pt II) version" as the wrong master was delivered to the Toshiba-EMI offices in Tokyo), the Kershenbaum remix of "Hold Back the Rain", and Night versions of "My Own Way" and "Hungry Like the Wolf".

The Japanese EP was the only version of Carnival to receive a CD release. On 31 May 1991, Toshiba/EMI compiled the four Japanese EPs – Nite Romantics, Carnival, Tiger Tiger, and Strange Behaviour onto a rare and highly sought-after double-CD set (TOCP-6707/8).

== Track listing ==
=== 12": EMI / 1A 062Z-64942 Netherlands ===
All tracks are written by Duran Duran.

No.	Title	Length
1.	"Hungry Like the Wolf (Night Version)"	5:12
2.	"Rio (Night Version)"	6:36
3.	"Planet Earth (Night Version)"	6:20
4.	"Girls on Film (Night Version)" (Alternate Mix)	5:45

=== 12": EMI-Odeon / 10C 054-064942 Spain ===
All tracks are written by Duran Duran.

No.	Title	Length
1.	"Hungry Like the Wolf (Night Version)"	5:30
2.	"Rio (Night Version)" (Album Version *)	5:39
3.	"Planet Earth (Night Version)"	6:20
4.	"Girls on Film (Night Version)" (Alternate Mix *)	5:45

- titles in Spanish "CARNAVAL"
- * – actual mix names

=== 12": Harvest / DLP-15006 Canada, United States ===
All tracks are written by Duran Duran.

No.	Title	Length
1.	"Hungry Like the Wolf" (Night Version)	5:14
2.	"Girls on Film" (Night Version)	5:26
3.	"Hold Back the Rain" (Carnival Remix)	7:00
4.	"My Own Way" (Carnival Remix)	4:29

- mixes not listed
- also released on MC (Harvest / 4DP-15006)

=== 12": EMI-Toshiba / EMS-50125 Japan ===
All tracks are written by Duran Duran.

No.	Title	Length
1.	"Rio (Part II)" (Full 7" mix *)	5:02
2.	"Hold Back the Rain (Re-mix)" (Carnival Remix *)	7:03
3.	"My Own Way" (Night Version *)	6:34
4.	"Hungry Like the Wolf" (Night Version)	5:14
5.	"New Religion" (Carnival Remix *)	5:13

- Also released on MC (EMI-Toshiba/ ZR18-769)
- Also released in Taiwan (EMI / LMSP-015)
- Japanese release includes obi strip and lyric sheet
- (early pressings of Carnival in Japan came with 2 fold-out colour tour inserts)
- * – unlisted mix names

== Personnel ==
Duran Duran

- Simon Le Bon – vocals
- Nick Rhodes – keyboards
- John Taylor – bass guitar
- Roger Taylor – drums
- Andy Taylor – guitar

Additional musicians

- Andy Hamilton – saxophone on "Rio"

Technical

- Colin Thurston – producer and engineer
- Renate – technician
- Malcolm Garrett, Assorted iMaGes, London – sleeve design

Recorded at:

- Chipping Norton
- Red Bus
- Utopia Studios
- AIR Studios
