= Planet Earth (Duran Duran song) =

Single by Duran Duran

from the album Duran Duran
- B-side: "Late Bar" (UK); "To the Shore" (US)
- Released: 2 February 1981
- Recorded: December 1980
- Studio: Red Bus (London)
- Genre: New wave; disco-punk; post-disco
- Length: 3:59 (single version); 6:20 (night version)
- Label: EMI; Capitol
- Songwriters: Simon Le Bon; John Taylor; Roger Taylor; Andy Taylor; Nick Rhodes
- Producer: Colin Thurston

Duran Duran UK singles chronology
"Planet Earth" (1981)	"Careless Memories" (1981)

Duran Duran US singles chronology
"Planet Earth" (1981)	"Girls on Film" (1981)

Music video
- "Planet Earth" on YouTube

"Planet Earth" is the debut single by the English pop rock band Duran Duran, released on 2 February 1981.

It was an immediate hit in the band's native UK, reaching number 12 on the UK Singles Chart on 21 February, and did even better in Australia, hitting number 8 to become Duran Duran's first top 10 hit anywhere in the world. Along with the track, "Girls on Film", "Planet Earth" also hit the top 40 on the US dance charts.

The song later appeared on the band's eponymous debut studio album Duran Duran, released in June 1981.

== Background ==
The sequenced part on this song is a Prophet-5 synth, while a Roland Jupiter-4 and a Crumar Performer were used for strings and other sounds. The flanging intro sound was the Jupiter 4 processed by an MXR flanger.

== Composition ==
=== Music ===
Musically, "Planet Earth" has been described as new wave and disco, but more specifically disco-punk and post-disco. Stephen Thomas Erlewine of The A.V. Club characterised it as a blend of disco and synth-punk, while the Omaha World-Herald's Roger Catlin wrote that the song combines a danceable disco beat with rock and funk. Annie Zaleski of Salon commented that the song felt "like a response to trends — punk, disco, Krautrock, Bowie — not a direct replication of what had already been done". "Planet Earth" has been likened to a range of artists and musical styles: Jon Bream of The Minneapolis Star said the track's "synthetic jungle rhythms" recalled the B-52s, Len Righi of The Morning Call described it as having a rhythm track reminiscent of Talking Heads, and Alexis Petridis of The Guardian commented that the song had a "Roxy Music-in-space" sound. Rob Sheffield of Rolling Stone wrote that the band aimed to merge the sounds of their two favorite groups Chic and the Sex Pistols, noting that the song features Chic's disco-inspired bass line and the punk attitude of the Sex Pistols.

Members of the band, particularly the guitarist Andy Taylor and the bassist John Taylor, cited disco-derived influences as key to the song's foundation. Andy Taylor saw the song's "essence" in Rod Stewart's 1979 disco-rock song "Da Ya Think I'm Sexy?", noting that it's synth-guitar hook shared the same scale, key, and opening chords (Dm7 and F) as Stewart's track, making the melody and counter-melody lines interchangeable. John Taylor described "Planet Earth" as "funky punk", saying he came from a punk background but became interested in disco; as a bass player, the song represented his "punky aspiration to be danceable to have that disco thing going on". He also said in his autobiography that the song was "influenced by German techno as much as it was by punk and New York disco".

"Planet Earth" opens with a sequenced keyboard part that Jeremy Allen of The Guardian said "owed a debt of gratitude to Japan's Quiet Life". The song rests on what Zaleski described as a rhythmic foundation of John Taylor's "galloping bass" and the drummer Roger Taylor's "stomping beats". Layered over this are "shimmering synths" from the keyboardist Nick Rhodes and a "zig-zagging melodic line" from Andy Taylor, with these parts alternating in a "call-and-response" pattern. Throughout the track, occasional textures, such as "handclaps, sparkling synth ambience, bass curlicues, and a smoldering bridge — adds verve throughout". Zaleski wrote in Diffuser that Rhodes' programming and the tension in his arrangements are central to the song's appeal, giving it a sound that feels "beamed in from outer space". Darryl Enriquez of the Abilene Reporter-News commented that Andy Taylor's guitar playing "pops in and out of the song adding flavor and energy", and noted that the vocals and harmonies led by the lead vocalist Simon Le Bon, together with Rhodes' keyboards, give the song a "feeling of detachment". John Taylor similarly recalled that Andy Taylor's "heavy-metal lead line, strangled through the Roland guitar synth", brought power to the track "under a dark light".

=== Themes and lyrics ===
Critics described "Planet Earth" as having a science fiction theme. Valac Van Der Veene of Sounds referred to it as featuring "sci-fi space lyrics warbled by an appealing voice", while Alan Niester of The Globe and Mail wrote that the song "is filled out with trendy Brit sci-fi rock a la Alan Parsons". According to the music journalist Stephen Davis in his book Please Please Tell Me Now, some fans believed that the song (with lines such as "there's no sign of life") was about the arrival of aliens. However, Le Bon rejected the idea that "Planet Earth" has a science fiction theme. Instead, he described the song as being about waking up to the world and opening one's eyes to what is around them. He explained that the lyrics came from imagining what it would be like to see Earth for the first time, along with the idea of being born, "but at an age and with the kind of mentality where you can actually see what's going on". John Taylor said the lyrics felt new compared to what had come before, explaining that the song was "a celebration of youth, of the possibility of youth, about feeling good to be alive". He added that this approach felt fresh after several years of songs focused on themes such as hate and war.

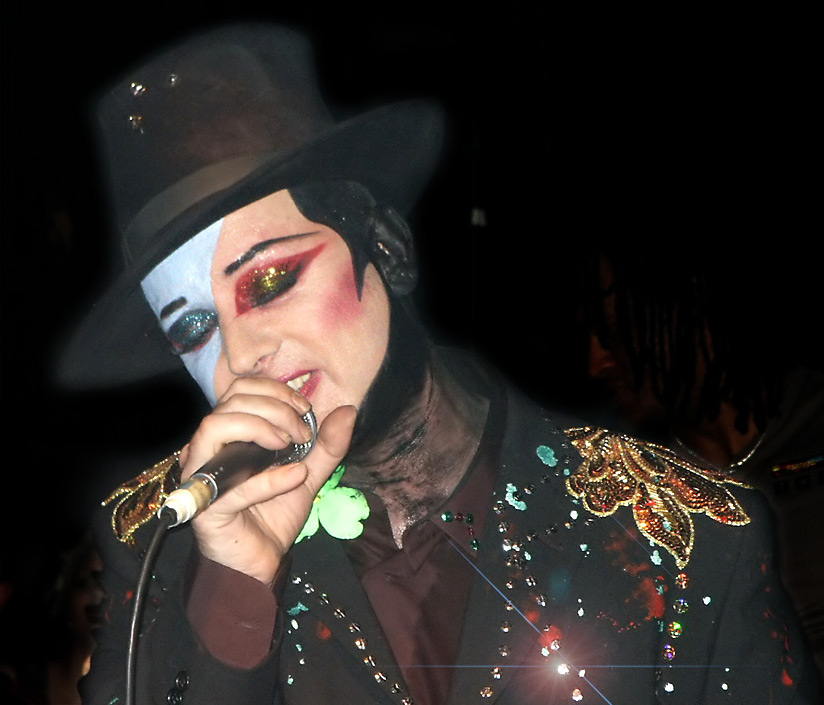
"Planet Earth" makes one of the earliest lyrical references to the New Romantic movement, which Duran Duran helped define.

"Planet Earth" opens with the line, "Only came outside to watch the night fall with the rain", which Jim Zebora of the Record-Journal described as the beginning of an "intriguing pattern of imagery". Zaleski noted that the first verse includes the lyrics, "I heard you making patterns rhyme / Like some New Romantic looking for the TV sound," and wrote that this line alludes to a degree of suspicion toward the New Romantic movement. According to the author Steve Malins in his book Wild Boys, the inclusion of the phrase "New Romantic" in the lyrics were inspired by a Sounds magazine article about Spandau Ballet; John Taylor explained that after seeing the phrase "Enter the New Romantics", the band decided to include it in the song, and Rhodes later said the lyric was intended with irony. Zaleski wrote that the next line "You'll see I'm right some other time" suggests the narrator views the style as temporary. She also commented that the phrase "making patterns rhyme" establishes an enigmatic tone and can be seen as a smart description of music itself. As the song continues, Zaleski wrote that the lyrics evoke themes of new beginnings and wanting to be heard, while a line like "There's no sign of life" could imply either an apocalyptic image or a commentary on culture. Zebora added that the song features a "speeded up Mamas and Papas-like" chorus.

== Release ==
"Planet Earth" was released as a single in the United Kingdom on 2 February 1981 by EMI Records, with "Late Bar" as its B-side. The single's artwork was designed by Malcolm Garrett of Assorted Images. It entered the UK Singles Chart at number 67 on the week of 21 February 1981 and later peaked at number 12. Although it narrowly missed the Top Ten, the chart position was sufficient for Duran Duran to appear on the television program Top of the Pops. Outside the UK, the single reached number eight in Australia and number fourteen in Ireland. In the United States, the song was released by Capitol Records on its Harvest imprint, with "To the Shore" as the B-side. However, it failed to chart there due to a lack of promotion.

=== Music video ===
The music video for "Planet Earth" was the band's first collaboration with the director Russell Mulcahy. According to John Taylor, the main motivation for producing the video was to support the song's growing attention in Australia through television exposure, rather than traveling there for promotional appearances. The video ultimately helped broaden the song's visibility internationally, particularly in Portugal, Sweden, and further across Australia. John Taylor was initially hesitant about the music video format, believing it was "certainly at odds with the whole punk ethic".

The production featured a flamboyant and highly stylized visual approach. According to Malins, the video included "dyed hair, lip-gloss and shirts with gigantic ruffles", all styled by Patti Bell on a £500 clothing budget. Specific moments in the video included Le Bon dancing on an upside-down crystal pyramid while wearing jodhpurs, Rhodes with frizzy orange-blond hair and an elaborate frilled shirt at his keyboard, and Roger Taylor appearing shirtless. Bell's friend, known as "Gay John", was one of the dancers and assisted with the band's outfits. The shirts were difficult to maintain, reportedly taking about an hour to iron each one.

== Formats and track listings ==
=== 7": EMI / EMI 5137 United Kingdom ===
1. "Planet Earth" – 3:59
2. "Late Bar" – 2:54

=== 12": EMI / 12 EMI 5137 United Kingdom ===
1. "Planet Earth" (night version) – 6:18
2. "Planet Earth" – 3:59
3. "Late Bar" – 2:54

=== CD: Part of Singles Box Set 1981–1985 ===
1. "Planet Earth" – 3:59
2. "Late Bar" – 2:54
3. "Planet Earth" (night version) – 6:18

=== CD: Part of Duran Duran: 2010 Special Edition (CD2) ===
1. "Planet Earth" (night mix) – 7:00
- This rare alternative version can also be found on the Strange Behaviour remix album, released in 1999.

== Charts ==
=== Weekly charts ===
Weekly chart performance for "Planet Earth"
Chart (1981-1985)	Peak position
Australia (Kent Music Report)	8
Ireland (IRMA)	14
Israel (IBA)	11
Spain Airplay (Top 40 Radio)	10
UK Singles (Official Charts)	12
US Disco Top 100 (Billboard)	26

=== Year-end charts ===
Year-end chart performance for "Planet Earth"
Chart (1981)	Position
Australia (Kent Music Report)	59

== Personnel ==
Duran Duran

- Simon Le Bon – lead and backing vocals
- Andy Taylor – electric guitar, guitar synthesizer, backing vocals
- John Taylor – bass guitar, backing vocals
- Roger Taylor – drums
- Nick Rhodes – synthesizers, programming
- Colin Thurston – producer
