= Girls on Film =

Single by Duran Duran

from the album Duran Duran
- B-side: "Faster Than Light"
- Released: 13 July 1981
- Recorded: December 1980
- Studio: Red Bus (London)
- Genre: New wave; synth-pop; post-disco
- Length: 3:27 (single version); 5:31 (night version); 5:45 (extended night version); 5:41 (instrumental version)
- Label: EMI; Capitol
- Songwriters: Simon Le Bon; John Taylor; Roger Taylor; Andy Taylor; Nick Rhodes
- Producer: Colin Thurston

Duran Duran UK singles chronology
"Careless Memories" (1981)	"Girls on Film" (1981)	"My Own Way" (1981)

Duran Duran US singles chronology
"Planet Earth" (1981)	"Girls on Film" (1981)	"Hungry Like the Wolf" (1982)

Music video
- "Girls on Film" on YouTube

"Girls on Film" is the third single by the English pop rock band Duran Duran, released on 13 July 1981. It became Duran Duran's first top 10 hit on the UK Singles Chart, peaking at number 5 in July 1981, and an international hit reaching the top 20 in several countries, including number 1 in Portugal, number 4 in New Zealand and number 11 in Australia.

== Background ==
Originally written and demoed in 1979 by an early line-up of the band featuring lead vocalist Andy Wickett, Duran Duran re-wrote and re-recorded the song for their 1981 debut album. The different original version, which co-writer Wickett said "was inspired by the dark side of the glitz and glamour", was released as part of an EP in 2018.

== Music video ==
A music video was made with directing duo Godley & Creme (of 10cc) and director of photography Steven Bernstein at Shepperton Studios in July 1981. Due to the inclusion of female nudity the video exists in both uncensored form (which was played in nightclubs and on The Playboy Channel) and a heavily censored version for MTV.

The band's managers Paul and Michael Berrow hoped an attention-grabbing video would increase the band's popularity in the United States, so they encouraged the video's directors to make the video scandalous. The video was inspired by fashion shows Godley had seen in France, and mud wrestling Creme had seen in L.A.

During the shoot, the band was instructed to stay away from the female actors, but Simon Le Bon said they snuck in anyway.

== Critical reception ==
Retrospectively, music journalist Annie Zaleski hailed "Girls on Film" as "the perfect balance of post-disco and futuristic pop", describing it as a song that "starts with the clicking camera sound before jumping into a funky rhythmic strut — courtesy of John Taylor's rubber-band-stretch bass lines and Roger Taylor's percolating drums — and a vibrant counterpoint: Andy Taylor's lilting, slashing riffs and Nick Rhodes' avant, spacey keyboards." and lyrics featuring "warning about the downsides of fame and modeling" with "some pointed critiques of an industry that values only surface beauty."

In 2024, The Guardian's Alexis Petridis ranked it Duran Duran's greatest song: "It remains the most exciting thing they ever made, its choppy distorted guitar as close as they got to achieving their original “Chic-meets-the-Sex-Pistols” blueprint. Its chorus is a six-note call sign; its lyrics are unable to decide whether they think the fashion world is an exploitative nightmare or a glamorous world to aspire to."

== Formats and track listings ==
=== 7": EMI / EMI 5206 (United Kingdom) ===
1. "Girls on Film" – 3:29
2. "Faster Than Light" – 4:26

=== 12": EMI / 12 EMI 5206 (United Kingdom) ===
1. "Girls on Film" (night version) – 5:31
2. "Girls on Film" – 3:29
3. "Faster Than Light" – 4:26

=== 12": EMI / 062-20 07176 Greece ===
1. "Girls on Film" (night version) – 5:45
2. "Girls on Film" (instrumental) – 5:41
3. "Faster Than Light" – 4:26
- The Greek 12" release of "Girls on Film" contains a version with a longer camera intro not found on the other 12 inches. It was also released on some versions of the 1982 Carnival EP. It appeared for the first time on CD on the 2010 remaster of Duran Duran as the "extended night version".
- The instrumental version was not released on other vinyl releases and remains unreleased on CD.

=== CD: Part of Singles Box Set 1981–1985 ===
1. "Girls on Film" – 3:27
2. "Faster Than Light" – 4:26
3. "Girls on Film" (night version) – 5:31

=== CD: Part of Duran Duran (2010 Special Edition) ===
1. "Girls on Film" (extended night version) – 5:45
2. "Girls on Film" (night mix) – 5:42
- Track 1 is the same version as the Greek 12" release (EMI / 062-20 0717 6).
- Released in 2010.

=== CD: The Remixes (United States) ===
1. "Girls on Film" (Tin Tin Out mix) – 6:55
2. "Girls on Film" (Salt Tank mix) – 6:29
3. "Girls on Film" (16 Millimetre mix) – 7:28
4. "Girls on Film" (Tall Paul mix 1) – 8:28
5. "Girls on Film" (night version) – 5:31
6. "Girls on Film" (8 Millimetre mix) – 5:47
- Released in 1999.

=== 12": The Remixes (United States) ===
1. "Girls on Film" (Tin Tin Out mix) – 6:55
2. "Girls on Film" (Salt Tank mix) – 6:29
3. "Girls on Film" (Tall Paul mix 1) – 8:28
4. "Girls on Film" (8 Millimetre mix) – 5:47
- Released in 1999.

== Personnel ==
Duran Duran

- Simon Le Bon – vocals
- Nick Rhodes – keyboards
- John Taylor – bass guitar
- Roger Taylor – drums
- Andy Taylor – guitar

Technical

- Colin Thurston – producer and engineer

== Charts ==
=== Weekly charts ===
Weekly chart performance for "Girls on Film"
Chart (1981–1982)	Peak position
Australia (Kent Music Report)	11
Ireland (IRMA)	16
Israel (IBA)	6
Netherlands (Dutch Top 40 Tipparade)	17
New Zealand	4
Portugal (AFP)	1
Spain Airplay (Top 40 Radio)	14
Swedish Singles Chart	15
UK Singles (Official Charts)	5

Chart (1999)	Peak position
US Billboard Dance/Club Play Songs	24

=== Year-end charts ===
Year-end chart performance for "Girls on Film"
Chart (1982)	Position
Australia (Kent Music Report)	61

As of October 2021 "Girls on Film" is the fifth most streamed Duran Duran song in the UK.

== Certifications ==
Region	Certification	Certified units/sales
New Zealand (RMNZ)	Gold	15,000^{‡}
United Kingdom (BPI)	Gold	400,000^{‡}
^{‡} Sales+streaming figures based on certification alone.

== See also ==
- Sexuality in music videos
