= Colin Thurston =

English music producer (1947–2007)

- Born: 1947; Singapore
- Origin: London, England
- Died: 15 January 2007 (aged 59–60)
- Genres: Rock; new wave
- Occupations: Record producer; arranger
- Years active: 1977–2007

Colin Thurston (b. 1947 – 15 January 2007) was an English recording engineer and record producer, known for his work with David Bowie, Duran Duran and the Human League.

== Early life ==
Born in Singapore in 1947, Thurston was a guitarist in several bands and his first work in music was as a jingle writer. His first project was a commercial for Scotch-Brite.

Thurston moved to England, and worked at first for an advertising agency in London. Thurston received requests from writers at the agency to produce demos for their work. It was through one of these writers that he learned of an engineering job at Southern Music Studio. He later did engineering work at a variety of London-area studios, eventually meeting producer Tony Visconti at a studio known at the time as Good Earth Studios.

== Career ==
Along with Tony Visconti, Thurston co-engineered David Bowie's Heroes and Iggy Pop's Lust for Life, both released in 1977. He is also credited with co-producing the latter album with Bowie and Pop, under the collective pseudonym "Bewlay Bros", which is a reference to a song from Bowie's album Hunky Dory.

Thurston's debut as a solo producer was Magazine's second album Secondhand Daylight (1979). He later recalled, "I think they were a bit nervous and so I didn't tell them it was my first production." That same year, he produced the Human League's first album, Reproduction and their single "I Don't Depend on You" released under the name of The Men.

He achieved widespread recognition with Duran Duran's debut album (1981) and the follow-up Rio (1982). The band's bassist, John Taylor, later described Thurston as "a major catalyst for the Eighties sound". The band's keyboardist, Nick Rhodes, told The New York Observer in 2017, "I love [the Human League's] Reproduction. That one particularly was an inspiration because that came out before [Duran Duran's debut album], and Colin produced that one. It was one of the reasons that we got Colin Thurston. He had been the engineer of those great albums that Iggy and Bowie made together, and he produced Human League. He knew exactly what we liked."

Thurston produced tracks on Bow Wow Wow's albums See Jungle! See Jungle! Go Join Your Gang Yeah, City All Over! Go Ape Crazy! (1981) and I Want Candy (1982), as well as Talk Talk's debut album, The Party's Over (1982). He co-produced Kajagoogoo's debut album White Feathers (1983) with Nick Rhodes of Duran Duran. Rhodes said of his work with Thurston, "He gave me a good understanding of how things really work; how to put together a track, how to balance things and how to spread things out in the mix. He had a very traditional background, but at the same time, he was a maverick. We did a lot of things like tape-phasing, which I had never seen before; he also made tape loops. All this stuff was so much fun and so interesting while you were learning."

Thurston produced Howard Jones's debut single "New Song" (1983), which ranked 28th on the top 40 singles released in the UK that year.

He also became an in-house producer for the Canadian independent record label, Brouhaha, in the late 1980s, working with Canadian acts such as Alta Moda, Neo A4 and the first English-language album for French-Canadian recording artist Daniel Lavoie.

Thurston was an executive committee member of the British Record Producers Guild (BRPG) (re-named Re-Pro in 1993), a sub-committee of the Association of Professional Recording Services that ran from 1978–1998. Re-Pro's executive members also included such producers as Trevor Horn, Hugh Padgham, Alan Parsons, and Robin Millar.

== Death ==
Thurston died on 15 January 2007. In a statement posted to Duran Duran's website, John Taylor wrote that "without Colin's depth of vision, we would never have become the band we became, would never have been able to make the first two albums," and said that Thurston had been "sick for some time" before his death.
