= Aviv (disambiguation) =

Aviv is basically spring season in Hebrew.

Aviv may also refer to:

- Aviv (name)
- Aviv (film), 2003 Israeli film
- Aviv (restaurant), Portland, Oregon, United States
- Kfar Aviv, moshav in the Central District of Israel

== See also ==
- Tel Aviv (disambiguation)
