= Aviv (name) =

Aviv is a given name and a surname of Hebrew origin literally meaning aviv. The feminine form of the given name is Aviva.

== Given name ==
- Aviv Alush (born 1982), Israeli actor, musician, model, and television host
- Aviv Avraham (born 1996), Israeli professional footballer
- Aviv Azaria (born 1991), Israeli footballer
- Aviv Barzelay (born 2002), Israeli Olympic swimmer
- Aviv Bushinsky (born 1967), American journalist, CEO, businessman, and undergraduate program communications lecturer
- Aviv Geffen (born 1973), Israeli rock musician, singer, songwriter
- Aviv Hadad (born 1984), Israeli footballer
- Aviv Kohavi (born 1964), 22nd Chief of General Staff of the Israel Defense Forces
- Aviv Nevo (born 1965), Israeli-American venture capitalist
- Aviv Pinkas (born 1992), Israeli actress
- Aviv Regev (born 1971), American computational biologist
- Aviv Volnerman (born 1980), Israeli soccer player
- Aviv Yechezkel (born 1994), Israeli former cyclist

== Surname ==
- Diana Aviv, South African American business executive
- Din Din Aviv (Dina Aviv) (born 1974), Israeli pop and folk singer
- Haim Aviv (1940–2021), Israeli molecular biologist
- Jonathan E. Aviv (born 1960), American surgeon and professor
- Juval Aviv (born 1947), Israeli-American security consultant
- Nurith Aviv (born 1945), French film director
- Rachel Aviv, American writer
- Cities Aviv (born 1989), American rapper
