= Bushinsky =

Bushinsky may refer to:

- Aviv Bushinsky (1967- ) Israeli journalist and businessman, son of Jay Bushinsky.
- Jay Bushinsky (1932–2018) American journalist
- Shay Bushinsky, Israeli chess player and software developer, son of Jay Bushinsky.
