= Aviva (given name) =

Aviva is a female first name. It is a modern Hebrew name which translates to 'spring' or 'springtime'.

== Russian first name ==
The name was borrowed into the Russian language as non-canonical (i.e., it cannot be used as baptismal name) "Ави́ва" (Aviva); rarely used. Its masculine version is Aviv. The Russian-language diminutives of "Aviva" are Avivka (Ави́вка) and Viva (Ви́ва).

== People with this name ==
- Aviva (singer), part of duo Shuky & Aviva
- Aviva Armour-Ostroff, Canadian actress, writer and filmmaker
- Aviva Baumann (born 1984), American actress
- Aviva Burnstock (born 1959), British academic
- Aviva Cantor (born 1940), American journalist
- Aviva Chomsky (born 1957), American academic
- Aviva Dautch (born 1978), British poet, academic and curator
- Aviva Drescher, cast member who joined The Real Housewives of New York City in season 5
- Aviva Gileadi (1917–2001), Israeli nuclear scientist
- Aviva Kempner (born 1946), American filmmaker
- Aviva Rabinovich (1927–2007), professor of botany, chief scientist at the Israel Nature and Parks Authority, environmental activist
- Aviva Rahmani, American land artist
- Aviva Semadar (1935–2025), Israeli folklore and chanson singer
- Aviva Slesin, Lithuanian documentary filmmaker
- Aviva Uri (1922–1989), Israeli painter

== Fictional characters ==
- Aviva Corcovado, one of the main characters in Wild Kratts, an American-Canadian children's animated series
- Aviva Masters, one of the main characters in the 2007 film Primeval

== See also ==
- Aviv (name)
