= Tel Aviv (disambiguation) =

Tel Aviv, the Hebrew word for "Spring Mound" (where "spring" is the season), is a city in Israel.

It may also refer to:

- "Tel Aviv", an instrumental on Duran Duran (1981 album)
- Tel Aviv District, a district of Israel
- Tel Aviv Metropolitan Area, the largest metropolitan area in Israel
- An alternative transcription of Tel Abib, a place mentioned in the Bible

== Distinguish from ==
- Telavi, the main city and administrative center of Georgia (Caucasus)'s eastern province of Kakheti
