= Late Bar =

1981 song by Duran Duran

- UK picture sleeve (reverse)

Single by Duran Duran
- A-side: "Planet Earth"
- Released: 2 February 1981
- Recorded: December 1980 – January 1981
- Studio: Red Bus (London)
- Genre: Pop
- Length: 2:57
- Label: EMI
- Songwriters: Simon Le Bon; John Taylor; Roger Taylor; Andy Taylor; Nick Rhodes
- Producer: Colin Thurston

Audio video
- "Late Bar" on YouTube

"Late Bar" is a song by the English pop rock band Duran Duran. Written about the Rum Runner, a club in Birmingham where the band began writing and rehearsing, it incorporates early elements of their developing sound, including funk-influenced rhythms, prominent keyboards, and vocals by the lead singer Simon Le Bon.

The song was released on 2 February 1981 as the B-side to Duran Duran's debut single, "Planet Earth", but was not included on their first studio album, Duran Duran (1981). "Late Bar" became a favourite in the band's early live performances and has since been recognised by critics as one of the band's greatest songs.

== Background and composition ==
"Late Bar" was written about the Rum Runner, a club in Birmingham where Duran Duran began writing and rehearsing. The song is a pop track that features what would become recognisable elements of the band's sound: "tight, pulsing funk patterns" from the bassist John Taylor and the drummer Roger Taylor, "manic riffing" from the guitarist Andy Taylor, "voluminous keys" from the keyboardist Nick Rhodes, and a "shadowy, goth-tinged bellow" from the lead vocalist Simon Le Bon. Lyrically, the song focuses on "all-night parties in hotel rooms". Le Bon's vocal performance ranges "from a deep insouciant croon to a deranged 'la la la' in the chorus". The band's "squelchy, angular attempts to emulate Chic" and Le Bon's vocals were described as "works in progress".

== Release and legacy ==
"Late Bar" was released as the B-side of Duran Duran's first single, "Planet Earth", on 2 February 1981. The song was not included on the band's debut album Duran Duran (1981). Rhodes explained that this was because the band came from "a generation where obscure B-sides were sort of important on 7-inch vinyl", and they were "determined to have them". He added that for "the first five years or so — well, probably longer actually, the first 10 years — we really kept up that", with "Late Bar" being the first example. In the band's early years, the song was a favourite of their live performances.

Despite being released as a B-side, "Late Bar" has since been recognised by critics as a standout track in Duran Duran's catalog. Both Rik Flynn of Classic Pop and Jeremy Allen of The Guardian ranked it as the second greatest Duran Duran song. Flynn wrote that the song "made for an essential 7-inch", referring to its inclusion on the "Planet Earth" single. Allen noted that while Duran Duran were still developing their sound, "Late Bar" was "magnificent" and "draws you in". The author Steve Malins referred to it as "one of the group's best B-sides". Paul Sinclair of SuperDeluxeEdition described it as an "effortless pop song that evokes the whole 'new romantic' movement".

== Personnel ==
Credits adapted from Flynn except where noted:

Duran Duran

- Simon Le Bon – vocals
- Andy Taylor – guitar
- John Taylor – bass guitar
- Roger Taylor – drums
- Nick Rhodes – keyboards, synthesisers

Production

- Colin Thurston – production, engineering
