= Night Boat =

Song by Duran Duran

from the album Duran Duran
- Released: 15 June 1981
- Recorded: December 1980 – January 1981
- Studio: Red Bus (London)
- Genre: New wave
- Length: 5:26
- Label: EMI
- Songwriters: Simon Le Bon; John Taylor; Roger Taylor; Andy Taylor; Nick Rhodes
- Producer: Colin Thurston

Music video
- "Night Boat" on YouTube

"Night Boat" (Note: Titled "(Waiting for the) Night Boat" on the US release of Duran Duran (1981).) is a song by the English pop rock band Duran Duran from their debut studio album Duran Duran, released by EMI on 15 June 1981. Written by the lead singer Simon Le Bon, it was developed during the band's early period rehearsing at the Rum Runner nightclub in Birmingham. The track is known for its dark, atmospheric sound and unconventional structure, setting it apart from the album's overall dance-punk style.

Although not released as a single, a music video was filmed in early 1982, featuring horror-themed visuals that predated similar concepts in later music videos. Over time, "Night Boat" has gained recognition as one of the best songs in the band's catalogue, appearing on retrospective rankings and being revisited in live performances and a 2023 re-recording for their album Danse Macabre.

== Background ==
"Night Boat" was written by the lead singer Simon Le Bon and was inspired by his experience waiting for the 183 night service bus after rehearsing in Harrow with his earlier band Rov Ostrov in 1978. (Note: In the source, Le Bon refers to the band as "Pob Octpob", a phonetic rendering of Rov Ostrov using Cyrillic-style characters (Ров Остров).) Le Bon later changed the setting from a night bus to a night boat, saying he thought "night boat" sounded more interesting. According to Classic Pop's Steve Harnell, the title and lyrics were revised to give the song a more sophisticated feel. Bryan Reesman of American Songwriter noted that the setting behind "Night Boat", waiting alone late at night, offered "the perfect setting for a fear flick", where "all sorts of unsettling thoughts can creep into [one's] head". Le Bon had reportedly kept the lyrics in his journal for several years before Duran Duran recorded it for their debut eponymous album (1981) at Red Bus Studios in West London. The drummer Roger Taylor recalled that the track was developed while they were still doing rehearsals at the Rum Runner nightclub in Birmingham, where the band were still developing its sound.

== Composition ==
"Night Boat" is noted as one of the most unconventional tracks on Duran Duran. According to the keyboardist Nick Rhodes, the piece is "quite a strange" one, featuring what he described as a "very unusual arrangement". Roger Taylor echoed this sentiment, noting that its structure is "pretty out there" and diverges from the standard three- or four-minute pop format. Alexis Petridis of The Guardian similarly observed that while most of the album adheres to a post-punk disco style, "Night Boat" stands as an exception. He described it as darker and more atmospheric, with a long instrumental introduction that contributes to its less pop-oriented sound. This interpretation is further supported by Stephen Thomas Erlewine of The A.V. Club, who characterised the track's slow-building tension as a contrast to the "hedonistic flair" that defines much of the album.

"Night Boat" starts with an extended instrumental introduction, which spans over two minutes before Le Bon's vocals enter. The track begins with eerie ambient synthesisers that Reesman says evoke the feel of a spooky film soundtrack. Rhodes is credited with establishing this initial ambience, which Harnell describes as "a brooding sci-fi-like synth" passage with a faint Kraftwerk influence. As the song progresses, the full band gradually builds on the foundation set by the keyboards. Erlewine writes that the keyboards set "an atmosphere that the rest of Duran Duran ably exploits with rhythms and melody that favour coiled tension to hedonistic release". Reesman notes the addition of a "snaking bass", "gently thumping tom work", and "dramatically ringing guitar chords", while Harnell mentions a mix of ticking drums and crashing guitar from Andy Taylor that blend synthetic and organic textures. The rhythm section, provided by Roger Taylor and the bassist John Taylor reinforces what Harnell calls one of the band's darkest compositions.

== Music video ==
The music video for "Night Boat" was directed by Russell Mulcahy and filmed on the island of Antigua. Rather than being produced in 1981 when the song first appeared on Duran Duran, the video was shot and released in 1982, around the same time the band was filming the video for "Rio". Although "Night Boat" was not released as a single, the band produced a video that incorporated horror film elements such as zombie imagery and a monologue and dialogue, an unusual approach for music videos at the time. The release predates other horror-themed music videos such as Billy Idol's "White Wedding" and the Greg Kihn Band's "Jeopardy", and arrived over a year before Michael Jackson's "Thriller", whose hugely successful video famously featured zombies and inspired more artists to incorporate dialogue and horror elements. This led Reesman to believe that "Night Boat" was the first music video to feature zombies.

The video opens with the band standing on a dock in the late afternoon, apparently awaiting the arrival of a mysterious woman, as hinted at by an overhead exchange. Le Bon appears to enter a trance-like state, reciting a passage from Romeo and Juliet, specifically Mercutio's Queen Mab speech, while the other members grow increasingly uneasy about someone or something coming. As night falls, one of the band members is shown in silhouette screaming before running into the darkness. Pale-skinned, zombie-like figures, many of them women, then emerge and begin to torment the band. Kevin Wuench of the Tampa Bay Times likened the zombies' interest in them to that of the band's female admirers during the 1980s. The visual style of the zombies and atmosphere of the video have drawn comparisons to Lucio Fulci's Zombi 2 (1979), with Reesman suggesting it may have been a homage to the film. When asked about this interpretation, Rhodes responded affirmatively, noting that Mulcahy was "a big zombie fan" and that he himself has a passion for cult films. Rhodes also recalled the experience of filming the video with amusement, noting that their managers appeared as zombies hanging upside down from trees, covered in white plaster and goop.

== Legacy ==
"Night Boat" has gained increasing recognition over time, with some labelling it one of the best songs in Duran Duran's catalogue. Alexis Petridis of The Guardian ranked it the 13th greatest Duran Duran song, while Stephen Thomas Erlewine of The A.V. Club placed it at number 15. In 2015, Rhodes selected "Night Boat" as one of his ten favourite Duran Duran tracks in a feature for Stereogum. In 2005, the biographer Steve Malins commented on the song's longevity, stating that Rhodes' analogue synthesisers still sound "warm and organic" twenty years after the track's release. In 2023, Roger Taylor reflected on its complexity, calling it "a pretty deep and epic piece of music".

Duran Duran performed "Night Boat" live earlier in their career and brought it back for their 2004 reunion tour. In 1998, Le Bon performed the song in London with the Smashing Pumpkins, taking the lead on a dark, thunderous cover of the already moody track. After a long gap, it was revived during a Halloween show in Las Vegas in 2022. In 2023, the band recorded a new version of the track, retitled "Nightboat", for their Halloween-themed album Danse Macabre. Le Bon described it as one of the songs that "fit into the darker side of things", which he said qualified it for inclusion on the album. Reesman described this version as more ethereal and creepy, noting that it became the dramatic opening number in their live sets.

== Personnel ==
Duran Duran

- Simon Le Bon – vocals
- Andy Taylor – guitar
- John Taylor – bass guitar
- Roger Taylor – drums
- Nick Rhodes – synthesisers, keyboards

Technical

- Colin Thurston – production, engineering
