= Duran Duran (1981 album) =

Studio album by Duran Duran

Studio album by Duran Duran
- Released: 15 June 1981
- Recorded: December 1980 – January 1981
- Studios: Red Bus and Utopia (London); Chipping Norton (Oxfordshire)
- Genres: New wave; synth-pop; dance-punk
- Length: 39:42
- Label: EMI
- Producer: Colin Thurston

Duran Duran chronology
Duran Duran (1981)	Rio (1982)

1983 US reissue

Singles from Duran Duran
- 1. "Planet Earth" Released: 2 February 1981; 2. "Careless Memories" Released: 20 April 1981; 3. "Girls on Film" Released: 13 July 1981

Duran Duran is the debut studio album by the English pop rock band Duran Duran, released on 15 June 1981 through EMI. Produced by Colin Thurston, it was recorded in London and Oxfordshire between December 1980 and January 1981. The instrumental tracks were recorded quickly, but vocalist Simon Le Bon initially struggled to sing in the studio, leading to discussions about replacing him before EMI employee Dave Ambrose intervened.

Influenced by artists such as David Bowie, the Human League, Japan and Chic, Duran Duran features a mixture of new wave, synth-pop and dance-punk tunes with more atmospheric tracks, as well as elements of disco and punk rock. Le Bon's cryptic lyrics cover topics from youthful torment and confusion to the band's goals and ambitions. The cover artwork for the album and singles were designed by Malcolm Garrett.

Three singles appeared for the album, each promoted with music videos, which helped the album reach number three in the UK and remain in the top 100 for 118 weeks. The sexually-provocative video for "Girls on Film" was controversial, and generated publicity for the new MTV channel in the United States. Its initial US release on Capitol subsidiary Harvest Records was unsuccessful; a reissue there during the height of the band's fame in 1983 reached the top ten of the Billboard chart.

Duran Duran initially received mixed reviews. Critics felt the band did not stand out from their contemporaries, although some praised the singles. Retrospective reviews have been more positive, with critics complimenting the band for creating a modern sound that spearheaded the New Romantic movement. It was remastered and re-released in a 2010 special edition, with bonus demos and live tracks.

== Background ==
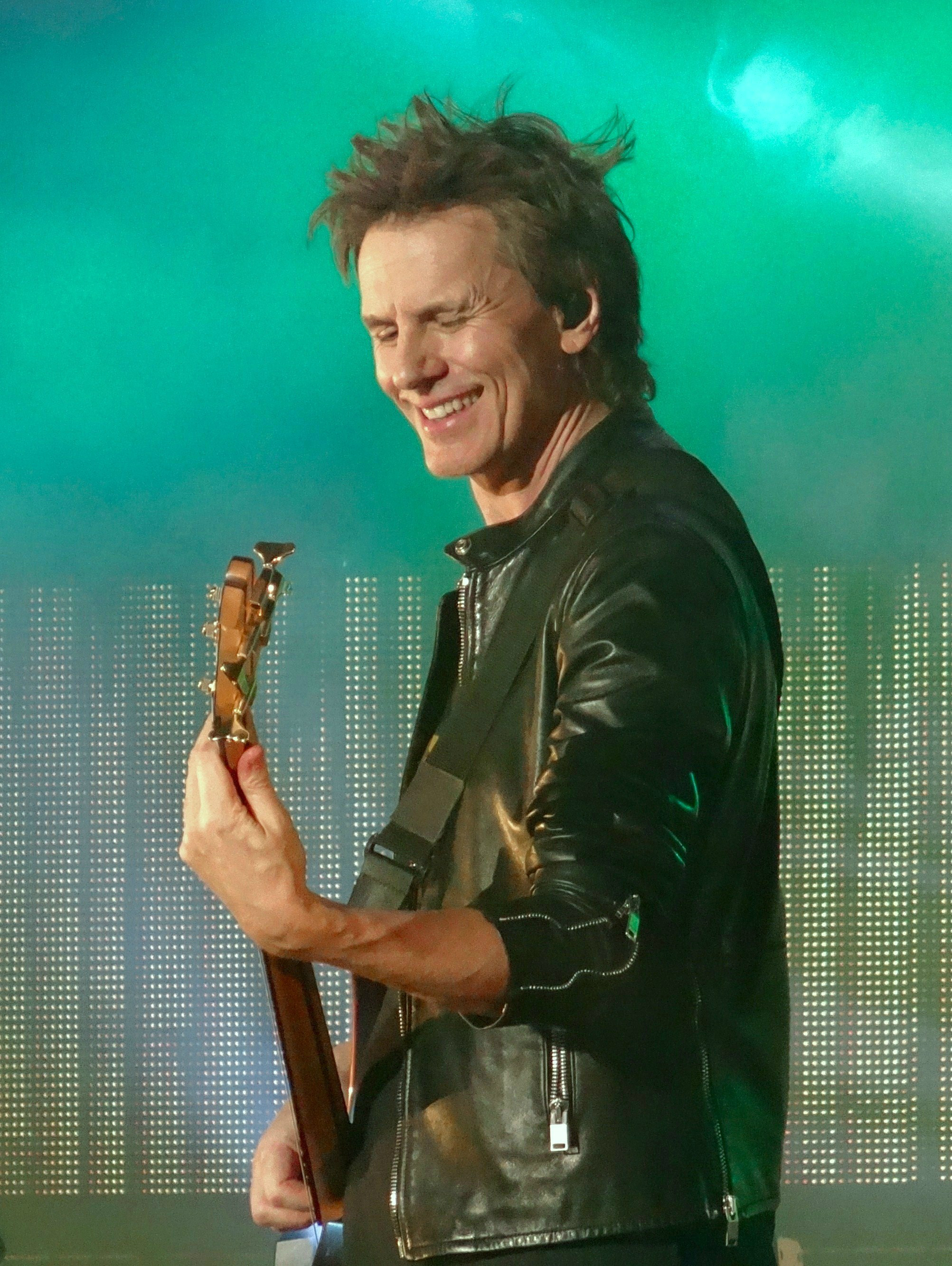
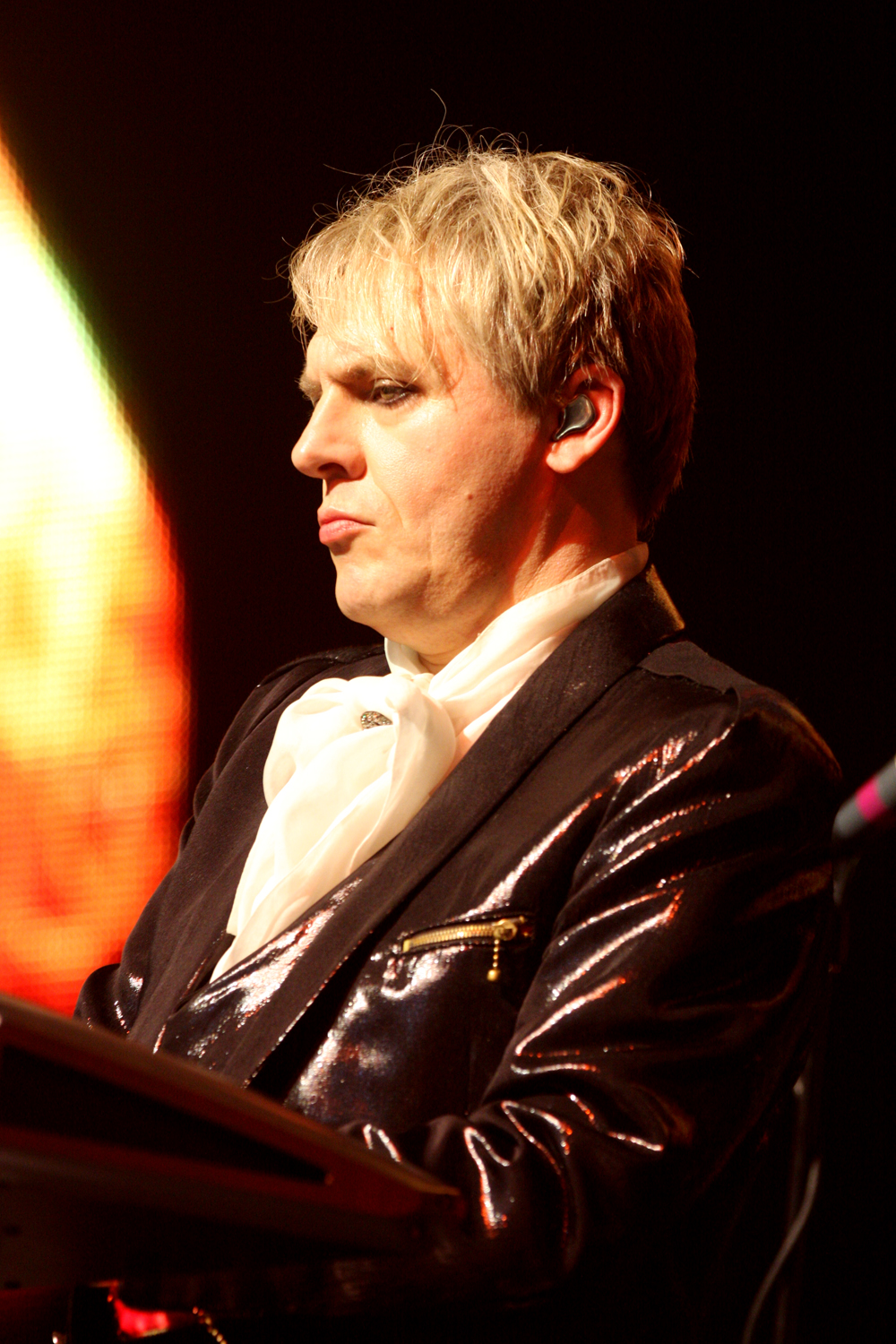
John Taylor (left, in 2015) and Nick Rhodes (in 2012) founded Duran Duran in 1978.

Childhood friends John Taylor and Nick Rhodes formed Duran Duran in Birmingham, England, in 1978 with John's art-school friend Stephen Duffy. The trio were influenced by David Bowie, the Human League, Ultravox, Lou Reed and Kraftwerk. The band performed live throughout 1979, going through numerous lineup changes before securing the lineup of John Taylor, Rhodes, drummer Roger Taylor and guitarist Andy Taylor by early 1980. Around this time, they were hired as the resident band of the Birmingham nightclub Rum Runner; the club's owners Paul and Michael Berrow became their managers.

Drama student Simon Le Bon was hired as Duran Duran's lead singer in May 1980. Le Bon struggled to sing at first and did not fit the band's desire for a singer who, according to Rhodes, was a mix between Reed, Bowie and Iggy Pop. Having written poems and stories during his childhood, the band were impressed with Le Bon's skill with melodies; he composed the lyrics and vocal line for "Sound of Thunder" during his first audition. Andy Taylor told a journalist, "Simon came in with this book of poetry and kept coming up with these ideas and melodies. We were like, 'This guy doesn't even know what his potential is.' There was an innocence to it all". Duran Duran's first performance with the lineup of Le Bon, Rhodes and the three Taylors was on 16 July 1980 at the Rum Runner.

== Development ==
The thing which makes us all work well together was that we are five very different individuals. We all have strong personalities. Sometimes this fact means that there's a lot of tension between us, because we all have conflicting ideas. But that only seems to make us work better.

— Nick Rhodes, 1981

Duran Duran spent two months writing songs and developing their sound. According to the biographer Steve Malins, John Taylor was an integral part of the group during this period: "The sensitive, charming, ad-libbing pop star to Rhodes's more controlled Pop Art alter ego". Rhodes worked creatively with Andy, playing around the keyboardist's patterns and solidifying the melodies. Malins writes that Andy's skill as an arranger assisted in forming the band's "rough, undisciplined mixture[s]" of punk, disco and electronic styles into tight, cohesive structures; Roger Taylor's "compact, unshakable drumming" provided a backbone for the group.

According to John Taylor, grooves, chord progressions and melodies were primarily derived from jam sessions. They further developed tracks they had debuted live, such as "Night Boat", "Late Bar", "Girls on Film", "Sound of Thunder" and an early version of "Tel Aviv". Andy Taylor later said, "In the beginning that worked because as we wrote the songs we'd all be pitching in and experimenting". John Taylor recalls that "Night Boat", in particular, arose from a "drifting keyboard sample" by Rhodes with Andy's Roland guitar synthesiser. Le Bon was a quick writer, coming up with lyrics to "Girls on Film" after receiving the first version. During the writing period, Duran Duran agreed to credit all songs to the band and split all earnings evenly.

By September 1980, Duran Duran had written all of what would become their first studio album. They continued performing live and demoing tracks at Bob Lamb's Birmingham studio and London's 24-track AIR Studios while Paul Berrow worked on attracting record-label attention. Throughout the rest of the year, they opened for Pauline Murray and Hazel O'Connor, and secured an article with Sounds magazine, whose writer Betty Page aligned them with the rising New Romantic movement and drew comparisons with the London-based new wave band Spandau Ballet. With their live performances attracting attention, Duran Duran signed with EMI following a bidding war with Phonogram Records.

== Recording ==
Duran Duran recorded their debut album over a six week period starting in December 1980. Colin Thurston was chosen as producer, having previously worked with Bowie, Pop, the Human League and Magazine; Thurston was happy to work with Duran Duran after hearing the demo of "Girls on Film". John Taylor later said, "Colin was absolutely the right producer for us. He knew how to take what was best about us and magnify it, and boy, did he take our sound to another level". Initial work at Abbey Road Studios was insufficient, so recording moved to West London's Red Bus Studios, a favourite of Thurston's. "Planet Earth" was chosen as the debut single with "Late Bar" as its B-side, so the single was tracked first and sent to pressing plants before the remaining tracks. Tracks recorded at Red Bus included "Careless Memories", "Night Boat", "Anyone Out There", "To the Shore", "Faster than Light", "Tel Aviv" and "Khanada".

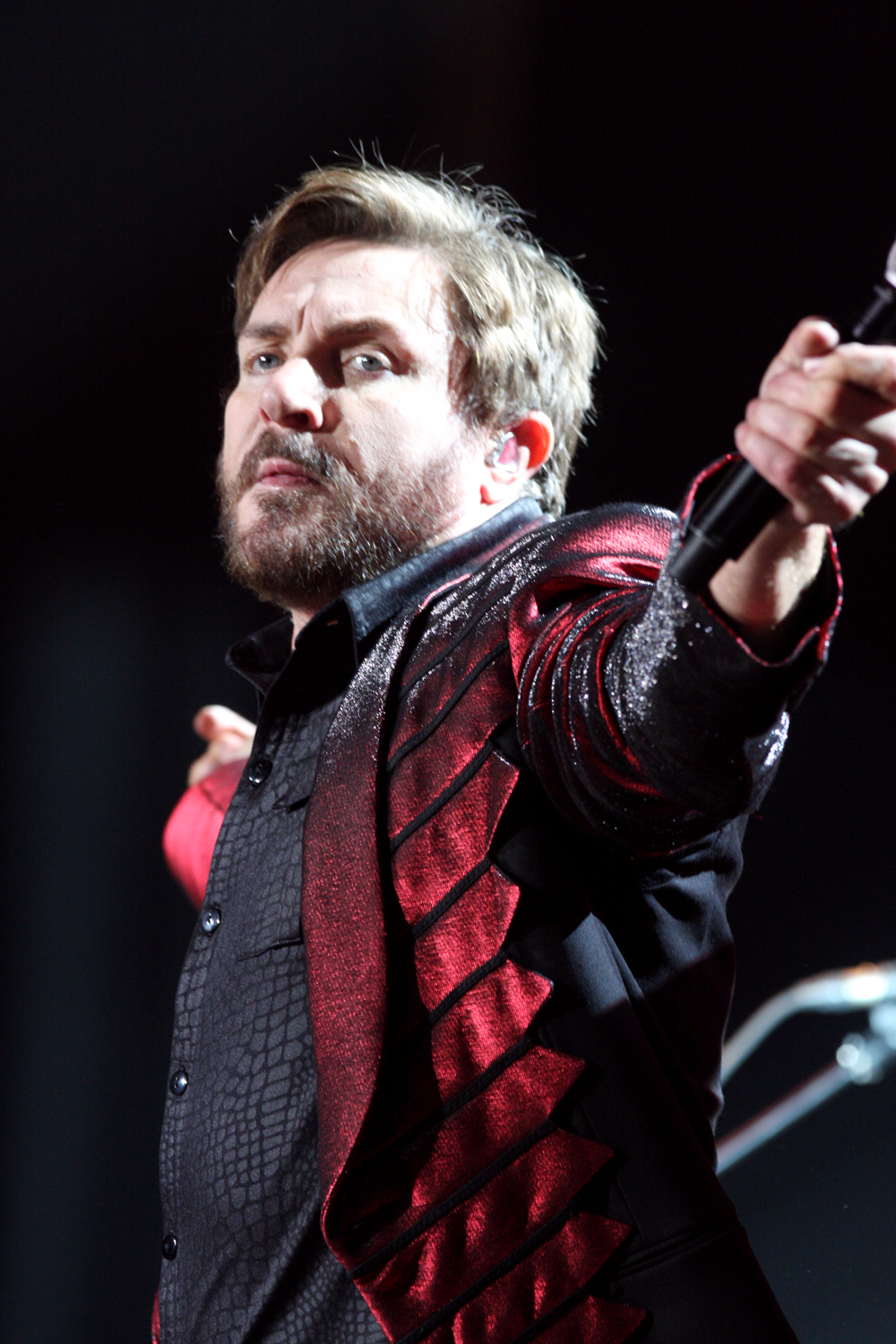
Lead singer Simon Le Bon initially struggled to sing in the studio, leading to discussions about replacing him before EMI A&R director Dave Ambrose intervened.

Recording began swiftly, with all the rhythm tracks completed within two weeks. Thurston gave each member individual attention with, in John Taylor's words, "no preferential treatment". Andy Taylor later said he played a pivotal role in establishing the band's early sound: "Colin was the filter that allowed us to come together as a whole". Rhodes gained insight into music production from Thurston while observing him behind the mixing desk. The band briefly returned to Birmingham for a Christmas Eve show, after which Andy Taylor and Rhodes travelled back to London to mix "Planet Earth" with Thurston at Utopia Studio. In addition to the album version, the band recorded an extended version of "Planet Earth" for use in nightclubs. According to John Taylor, this "night version" featured a longer middle section and a four-on-the-floor bass drum-driven intro, with additional percussion by Roger Taylor, slap bass by John and a horn section.

The sessions continued in January 1981 at Chipping Norton Recording Studios in Oxfordshire to record the guitar parts, keyboard overdubs and vocals. Due to Le Bon's inexperience with studio recording, the vocal tracks proved difficult; according to Andy Taylor, Thurston was "very rough" on the singer. Le Bon felt pressured, particularly when EMI executives arrived to check on progress. The Berrows were initially concerned that they would have to replace Le Bon before EMI's new A&R director, Dave Ambrose, intervened, telling the singer to take his time and remember "it's all about the songs". Le Bon also stopped drinking and smoking at the instruction of Paul Berrow. Recording completed after the band's first national tour.

== Music and lyrics ==
It's one of the most honest albums ever, in my opinion. [...] There wasn't a thing on that album that was contrived. We worked so hard and wished and prayed and put everything we had into that record ... All our musical ideas from when we were fifteen or sixteen years old.

— Nick Rhodes, 1982

Displaying the band's wide range of influences, including Bowie, Ultravox, Roxy Music, Japan, Giorgio Moroder and Chic, Duran Duran contains a mixture of new wave, synth-pop and dance-punk tunes, with more atmospheric tracks. Andy Taylor later said, "We wrote the first album to kind of make up what we were going to be, what this futuristic sound was". Writer Annie Zaleski describes this sound as "space-age keyboards, post-punk guitars, disco-inspired bass lines and Le Bon's vocal croon". Malins finds the album "full of melodic, dance-floor synthesiser pop delivered with youthful flair and the odd arty twist", at times similar to the "disco-rock" of Blondie's "Call Me" and Japan's Quiet Life (1979). Billboard magazine noted its dance rhythms against a pervading "rock disco mix". Punk rock elements are also present, especially on "Careless Memories".

Zaleski highlights the cohesive-yet-contrasting musical styles of Andy Taylor's guitars and Rhodes's synthesisers. Playing in a number of cover bands before joining Duran Duran, Andy's primary influences were rock bands which included AC/DC and Van Halen. He later said, "[Nick] would do Eno and I would do Jeff Beck or Jimmy Page". John Taylor believes that Andy Taylor's influences were responsible for developing their sound and enabling them to break out in America. Malins notes that the album has no guitar solos; Andy contributes "melodic and punchy" work, particularly on "Girls on Film" and "Friends of Mine". The band incorporated additional sounds into some tracks, such as the sound of Paul's Nikon camera opening "Girls on Film"; foghorns, humming motors and buoy bells on "Night Boat", and a string section conducted by Richard Myhill at AIR Studios on the instrumental "Tel Aviv".

Le Bon's cryptic lyrics cover a variety of subjects, from youthful torment and confusion to the band's goals and ambitions. The sexually exploitative "Girls on Film" is a critique of modeling culture, and "Sound of Thunder" tells the story of a man who begins World War III. The social commentary of "Friends of Mine" includes a line celebrating the release of George Davis, an armed robber who was the subject of a cause célèbre. Lost love and angst are explored on "Anyone Out There" and "Night Boat", respectively. "To the Shore" is a power ballad filled with, according to Davis, lyrical neologisms such as "gorging your sanhedralites". Le Bon shouts at one point during "Careless Memories". In his book Please Please Tell Me Now, Davis writes: "The fear of whispers and unwanted thoughts gives depth to the anxious lyrics, and Le Bon sounds harsh and bitter notes that wouldn't be heard from this band again for a long time".

"Planet Earth" briefly acknowledges the band's association with New Romantics, which Rhodes later called a form of irony; the band disliked their association with the movement. According to music journalist Stephen Davis, some fans believed that the song (with lines such as "there's no sign of life") was about the arrival of aliens; Le Bon later said that it may have been about the moment a child is born. In his memoir, John Taylor called "Planet Earth" "a celebration of youth, of the possibility of youth, about feeling good to be alive".

== Release and promotion ==
"Planet Earth", backed with "Late Bar", was released as the group's debut single on 2 February 1981. Its artwork was designed by Malcolm Garrett, who would design the band's album covers, singles and memorabilia for the next five years. The single's number 12 placement on the UK Singles Chart earned Duran Duran an appearance on the BBC's Top of the Pops. According to Malins, their "dandified [and] overdressed" appearance secured their spot in the New Romantic movement in the minds of adolescents. The band promoted "Planet Earth" with a music video directed by Russell Mulcahy. Showcasing the band's unique fashion choices, the video helped "Planet Earth" top the charts in Australia and Portugal. John Taylor was initially hesitant about the music video format, believing it was "certainly at odds with the whole punk ethic". The band's American label Capitol Records released "Planet Earth", backed with "To the Shore", in the US on its Harvest subsidiary, which failed to chart due to a lack of promotion.

Duran Duran launched a media campaign of interviews and photo shoots with Smash Hits, Mates and Patches magazines, while articles on the band appeared in The Face, i-D and New Sounds, New Styles. EMI released the band's second single, "Careless Memories" backed with "Khanada", on 7" vinyl on 20 April 1981; a 12" vinyl edition included a cover of Bowie's "Fame". The single stalled at number 37 after three weeks. Ambrose later called it a mistake: "I think in a way it was the marketing people's fear that the band was getting too commercial too fast. [...] 'Careless Memories' didn't get any airplay, which was a bit scary. It didn't lock in." To promote the single, the band appeared on the cover of Smash Hits for the first time. Rhodes later called its music video, directed by Perry Haines and Terry Jones, "the worst video we've ever made"; Malins described it as "a folly of New Romantic pretension".

EMI released Duran Duran on 15 June 1981. According to John, the band disliked the chosen cover photograph by Fin Costello but approved of Garrett's design. The band began a short 11-date Faster than Light tour on 29 June. To their surprise, they were greeted by screaming fans. Although the shows did not sell out, Le Bon said that their headbands inspired a short-lived "national fashion". On 13 July, "Girls on Film" was released as the third single, backed with "Faster than Light". Reaching the UK top five and receiving substantial airplay on Radio 1, the single made Duran Duran one of the biggest new bands of 1981. According to Andy, the band knew that "Girls on Film" would be a bigger hit than "Planet Earth" but wanted to wait until they were established to release it.

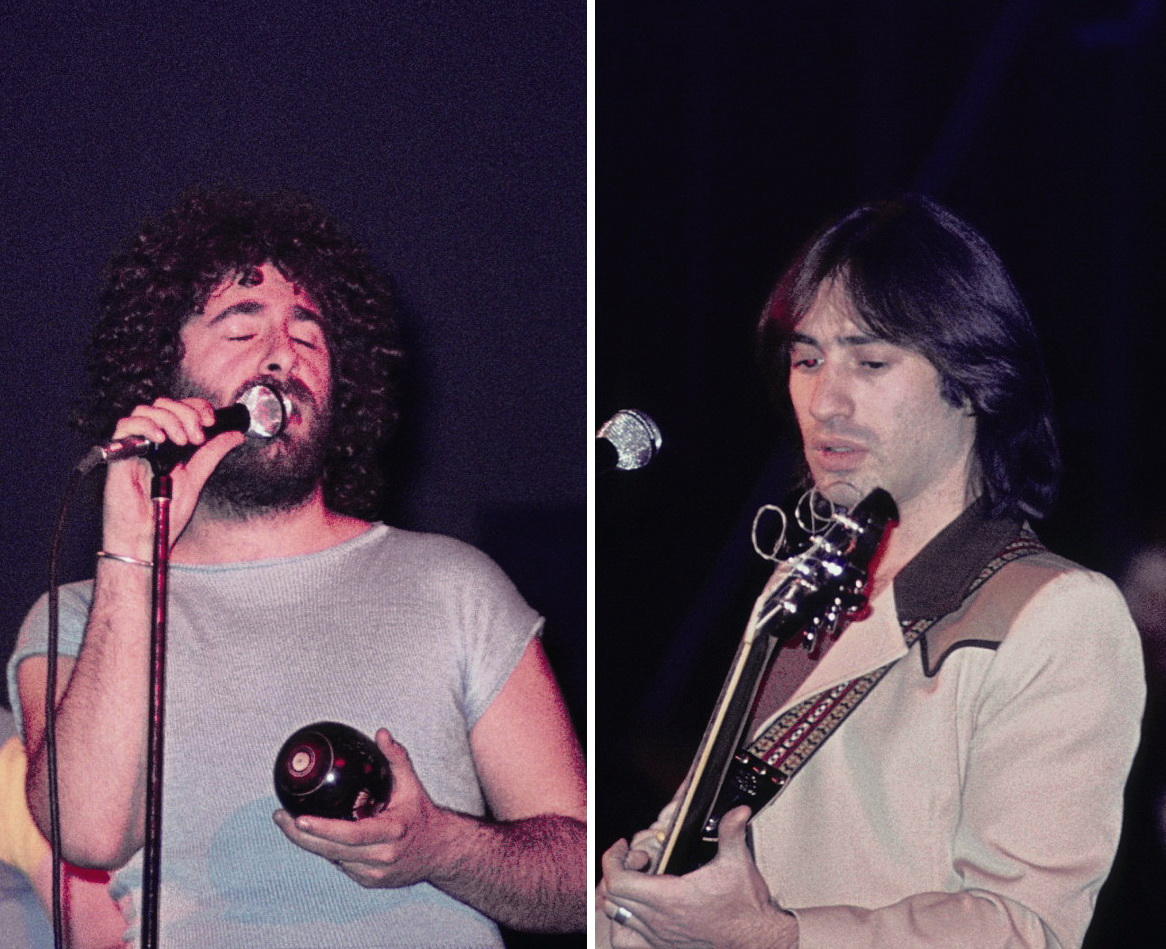
Godley & Creme directed the music video for "Girls on Film".

The single helped Duran Duran peak at number three in the UK and spend 118 weeks on the chart, going platinum by December 1982 and selling 1.6 million copies worldwide. Elsewhere, the album topped the chart in Portugal, reached number two in New Zealand, number three in Sweden and number nine in Australia. The album was released later in the US, since Capitol wanted to see how it performed in Europe and Australia. Appearing in late June on the Harvest label, the LP replaced "To the Shore" with the "night version" of "Planet Earth" and was unsuccessful. EMI issued a four-track, 12" EP entitled Nite Romantics in Japan, featuring the "night versions" of "Planet Earth" and "Girls on Film".

The music video for "Girls on Film", directed by Godley & Creme and filmed in August 1981, featured several semi-nude women performing sexually-suggestive acts in what author Roy Shuker described as "soft porn". According to Paul, the video was deliberately made for the American audience, who believed that Duran Duran were a "gay band". Ambrose said, "It was very provocative, the first semi-pornographic long-form video which really shook everyone up in the clubs. And that's what started to break [the band] in America". The American channel MTV, which premiered two weeks before the video was filmed, repeatedly screened the video. Co-founder John Sykes found it an effective way to generate publicity for the fledgling channel: "[It] was something that could never be played on broadcast networks, but we could play it on MTV. So it brought a lot of people over to cable and MTV, to not only discover the cool new bands but also this art form that was not yet ready for prime-time television". It was banned by the BBC in England; a heavily edited "day version" was made for airing on MTV, and the band capitalised on the controversy.

== Reception ==
Professional ratings
Review scores
Source	Rating
AllMusic	4/5 stars
Classic Pop	5/5 stars
The Encyclopedia of Popular Music	3/5 stars
Record Mirror	4/5 stars
The Rolling Stone Album Guide	4/5 stars
Smash Hits	4/10
Sounds	4.5/5 stars
Spin Alternative Record Guide	8/10

Duran Duran initially received mixed reviews. NME's Chris Bohn and Trouser Press's Ira Robbins felt the band lacked the skills needed to separate themselves from other New Romantic artists. Bohn was unimpressed with what he considered "a sensibly-packaged, respectively safe and self-consciously worthy record that belies the promised glamour of their two earlier singles". He concluded that Duran Duran "collapse through their weighty lifelessness" partly attributed to Thurston's "lacklustre" production that "reduces stridently colourful highlights to fit the densely homogeneous whole". Smash Hits' Beverly Hillier was also unimpressed, finding "Simon Le Bon's dull and lifeless vocals, together with lots of synth noises and rock guitar combine to make this album sound like one long drawn out single." In Melody Maker, Steve Sutherland believed the album worked better as background music and is "actively better not to listen to". He called the band "painlessly pointless, bouncy, bright and brilliant". More positively, Sounds magazine's Betty Page called Duran Duran an "incredible, mature debut bristling with prospective hit singles".

Billboard felt Duran Duran paired well with other acts of the New Romantic genre such as Spandau Ballet. Ira Robbins said the album "contains more creative and diverse noises and thoughts than all the real and would-be Spandau Ballets put together" in Trouser Press. The band were viewed in a mixed light by their musical peers. Gary Numan voiced his support, but Ultravox's Midge Ure was an outspoken critic. Human League and Heaven 17's founder Martyn Ware saw Duran Duran as a "glamour puss band" who had "no sense of originality or art about them".

Retrospective reviews of Duran Duran have been more positive. Twenty years after its release, Courtney Taylor-Taylor of the Dandy Warhols said: "If you go back to the first record, they smoked everybody. It's incredible! Disco bass-lines, Japan textures and mixed by the guy who did the Iggy Pop records". For AllMusic, Eduardo Rivadavia argued the album "artfully coalesced the sonic and stylistic elements of the burgeoning new romantic movement they were soon to spearhead". He called the band's choice of singles "ultra-smart" and, combined with their "groundbreaking" music videos, Duran Duran secured them as frontrunners of the MTV generation – "cementing their status as one of the decade's most successful pop music icons". Zaleski described the album as modern "art-school unorthodoxy meets pop futurism", and the work of a "glamorous and modern young band". In a 2021 article discussing the band's then-recent Future Past record, Rolling Stone called their debut album a "classic" that introduced "a radical new style of art-glam punk-disco swagger".

== Reissues ==
=== US 1983 Capitol reissue ===
During the height of the band's fame after the release of their second album Rio, Capitol reissued Duran Duran in the US in late April 1983 and added the band's then-current single "Is There Something I Should Know?" to the track listing. This release made the top ten of Billboard's Top LPs & Tape chart in August 1983, a few weeks after "Is There Something I Should Know?" hit number four, and reached number 24 on the Billboard Rock Albums chart. By the time Duran Duran released their third album Seven and the Ragged Tiger in late 1983, Duran Duran and Rio were still high on the charts.

The reissued Duran Duran LP featured updated cover art designed by Garrett, using the newer "double D" band logo featured on the "Is There Something I Should Know?" single and Seven and the Ragged Tiger cover. The new image positioned each band member equally close to the camera and depicted their varied looks, from tanned adventurers to rouged androgynes. This reflected the band's teen-focused marketing, which promoted the image and personality of its individual members: "everyone is someone's favourite".

=== Special edition ===
Duran Duran was reissued in a special edition on 29 March 2010, with remastered audio engineered by Andrew Walter at Abbey Road Studios. It contained the original album and a number of bonus tracks, including the band's AIR and Manchester Square studio demos recorded on 29 July and 8 December 1980, respectively. The special edition also included a BBC radio session, recorded on 19 June 1981, and a DVD with BBC footage and the band's music videos from the era. Fans criticised the remaster as containing audio "level-bouncing", loss of dynamic range and other defects, particularly on "Girls on Film". Andy Taylor, who had left the band by that point, criticised the remaster, saying that it "sounds like it was done down the pub" and condemned EMI for promoting the demos as bonus tracks: "They should be gifting them to fans after 30 years of support...shame on all involved". EMI acknowledged the defect at the beginning of "Girls on Film", calling it a result of master-tape deterioration, but refused to recall the reissue.

== Track listing ==
=== 1981 original release ===
All tracks are written by Simon Le Bon, Andy Taylor, John Taylor, Roger Taylor and Nick Rhodes.

Side one
No.	Title	Length
1.	"Girls on Film"	3:32
2.	"Planet Earth"	3:57
3.	"Anyone Out There"	4:03
4.	"To the Shore"	3:50
5.	"Careless Memories"	3:56

Side two
No.	Title	Length
6.	"Night Boat"	5:26
7.	"Sound of Thunder"	4:07
8.	"Friends of Mine"	5:46
9.	"Tel Aviv"	5:22
Total length:		39:42

Notes

- On the original US release, "Girls on Film" and "Planet Earth" switch places (and the "night version" of the latter is used instead). "To the Shore" was not on the original US release, and the 1983 US reissue added the previously unreleased "Is There Something I Should Know?" at the end of side one. The original 1983 US CD used the reissue version, however the 1993 UK Parlophone CD adds "To the Shore" to the end of the disc.

=== 1983 Capitol reissue ===
All tracks are written by Simon Le Bon, Andy Taylor, John Taylor, Roger Taylor & Nick Rhodes.

Side one
No.	Title	Length
1.	"Girls on Film"	3:32
2.	"Planet Earth"	3:57
3.	"Is There Anyone Out There"	4:03
4.	"Careless Memories"	3:56
5.	"Is There Something I Should Know?"	4:07

Side two
No.	Title	Length
6.	"(Waiting for The) Night Boat"	5:26
7.	"Sound of Thunder"	4:07
8.	"Friends of Mine"	5:46
9.	"Tel Aviv"	5:22
Total length:		39:59

=== 2010 limited edition ===
All tracks are written by Simon Le Bon, Andy Taylor, John Taylor, Roger Taylor & Nick Rhodes, except where noted.

No.	Title	Length
1.	"Girls on Film"	3:32
2.	"Planet Earth"	3:57
3.	"Anyone Out There"	4:03
4.	"To the Shore"	3:50
5.	"Careless Memories"	3:56
6.	"Night Boat"	5:26
7.	"Sound of Thunder"	4:07
8.	"Friends of Mine"	5:46
9.	"Tel Aviv"	5:22

2010 limited edition, the B-Sides
No.	Title	Writer(s)	Length
10.	"Late Bar" (B-side to "Planet Earth")		2:57
11.	"Khanada" (B-side to "Careless Memories")		3:28
12.	"Fame" (from the 12" single of "Careless Memories")	David Bowie, Carlos Alomar & John Lennon	3:18
13.	"Faster Than Light" (B-side to "Girls on Film")		4:31
Total length:			53:56

Disc 2
No.	Title	Length
1.	"Girls on Film" (Air Studio demo)	4:00
2.	"Tel Aviv" (Air Studio demo)	6:04
3.	"Anyone Out There" (Manchester Square demo)	4:11
4.	"Planet Earth" (Manchester Square demo)	5:03
5.	"Friends of Mine" (Manchester Square demo)	5:54
6.	"Late Bar" (Manchester Square demo)	3:05
7.	"Night Boat" (BBC Radio 1 Session, in mono)	5:13
8.	"Girls on Film" (BBC Radio 1 Session, in mono)	3:39
9.	"Anyone Out There" (BBC Radio 1 Session, in mono)	3:55
10.	"Like an Angel" (BBC Radio 1 Session, in mono)	4:53
11.	"Planet Earth" (night version)	6:17
12.	"Girls on Film" (extended night version)	5:46
13.	"Planet Earth" (night mix)	7:00
14.	"Girls on Film" (night mix)	5:43
Total length:		70:43

=== 2010 limited edition DVD ===
Music videos
No.	Title	Length
1.	"Planet Earth"	3:56
2.	"Planet Earth" (club version)	4:07
3.	"Careless Memories"	3:46
4.	"Girls on Film" (long uncensored version)	6:27
5.	"Girls on Film" (short censored version)	3:27
6.	"Night Boat"	5:10
7.	"A Day in the Life Featurette"	2:28

TV performances
No.	Title	Length
8.	"Planet Earth" (Top of the Pops, 5 March 1981)	3:36
9.	"Careless Memories" (Top of the Pops, 21 May 1981)	3:30
10.	"Girls on Film" (Top of the Pops. 30 July 1981)	3:16
11.	"Night Boat" (Old Grey Whistle Test, 7 July 1981)	5:33
12.	"Anyone Out There" (Old Grey Whistle Test, 7 July 1981)	4:05
13.	"Girls on Film" (Get Set for Summer, 8 August 1981)	3:24
14.	"Friends of Mine" (Multi-Coloured Swap Shop, 27 February 1981)	4:25
15.	"Girls on Film" (Multi-Coloured Swap Shop, 27 February 1981)	3:24
Total length:		60:34

== Personnel ==
Album credits adapted from AllMusic:

Duran Duran

- Simon Le Bon – lead vocals
- Andy Taylor – guitar, vocals
- John Taylor – bass guitar, vocals
- Roger Taylor – drums
- Nick Rhodes – keyboards, synthesisers

Production

- Colin Thurston – production, engineering
- Ian Little – production ("Is There Something I Should Know?")

== Charts ==
=== Weekly charts ===
1981–93 weekly chart performance for Duran Duran
Chart (1981–93)	Peak position
Australian Albums (Kent Music Report)	9
Canada Top Albums/CDs (RPM)	27
Hungarian Albums (MAHASZ)	34
New Zealand Albums (RMNZ)	2
Portuguese Albums (AFP)	1
Swedish Albums (Sverigetopplistan)	3
UK Albums (Official Charts)	3
US Billboard Top LPs & Tape	10
US Rock Albums (Billboard)	24

2024 weekly chart performance for Duran Duran
Chart (2024)	Peak position
Croatian International Albums (HDU)	7

=== Year-end charts ===
1981 year-end chart performance for Duran Duran
Chart (1981)	Position
UK Albums (BMRB)	27

1982 year-end chart performance for Duran Duran
Chart (1982)	Position
Australian Albums (Kent Music Report)	16
New Zealand Albums (RMNZ)	10
UK Albums (BMRB)	60

1983 year-end chart performance for Duran Duran
Chart (1983)	Position
UK Albums (Gallup)	89
US Billboard Top LPs & Tape	26

== Certifications ==
Sales certifications for Duran Duran
Region	Certification	Certified units/sales
Australia (ARIA)	Platinum	50,000^{^}
Canada (Music Canada)	2× Platinum	200,000^{^}
New Zealand (RMNZ)	2× Platinum	30,000^{‡}
United Kingdom (BPI)	Platinum	300,000^{^}
United States (RIAA)	Platinum	1,000,000^{^}
^{^} Shipments figures based on certification alone.^{‡} Sales+streaming figures based on certification alone.
