= Aviva Gileadi =

Israeli nuclear scientist (1917–2001)

- אביבה גלעדי
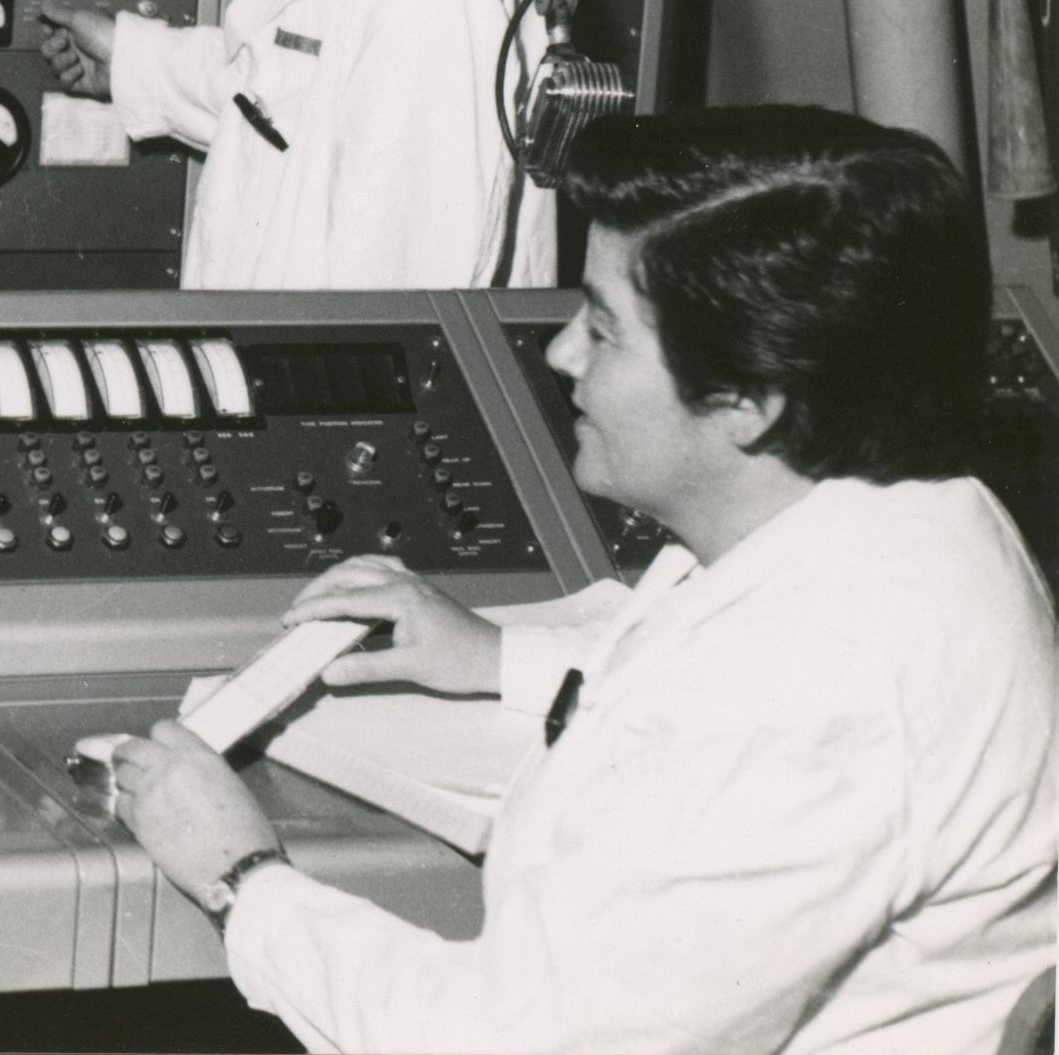
- Aviva Gileadi in Soreq Nuclear Research Center in 1963
- Born: November 26, 1917; Budapest, Hungary
- Died: June 8, 2001 (aged 83); Tampa, Florida
- Education: University of Budapest; University of Michigan (M.S.)
- Scientific career
- Fields: Nuclear Engineering and Physics
- Workplaces: Technion – Israel Institute of Technology, Weizmann Institute of Science, Argonne National Laboratory, Boiling Nuclear Superheater (BONUS) Reactor Facility

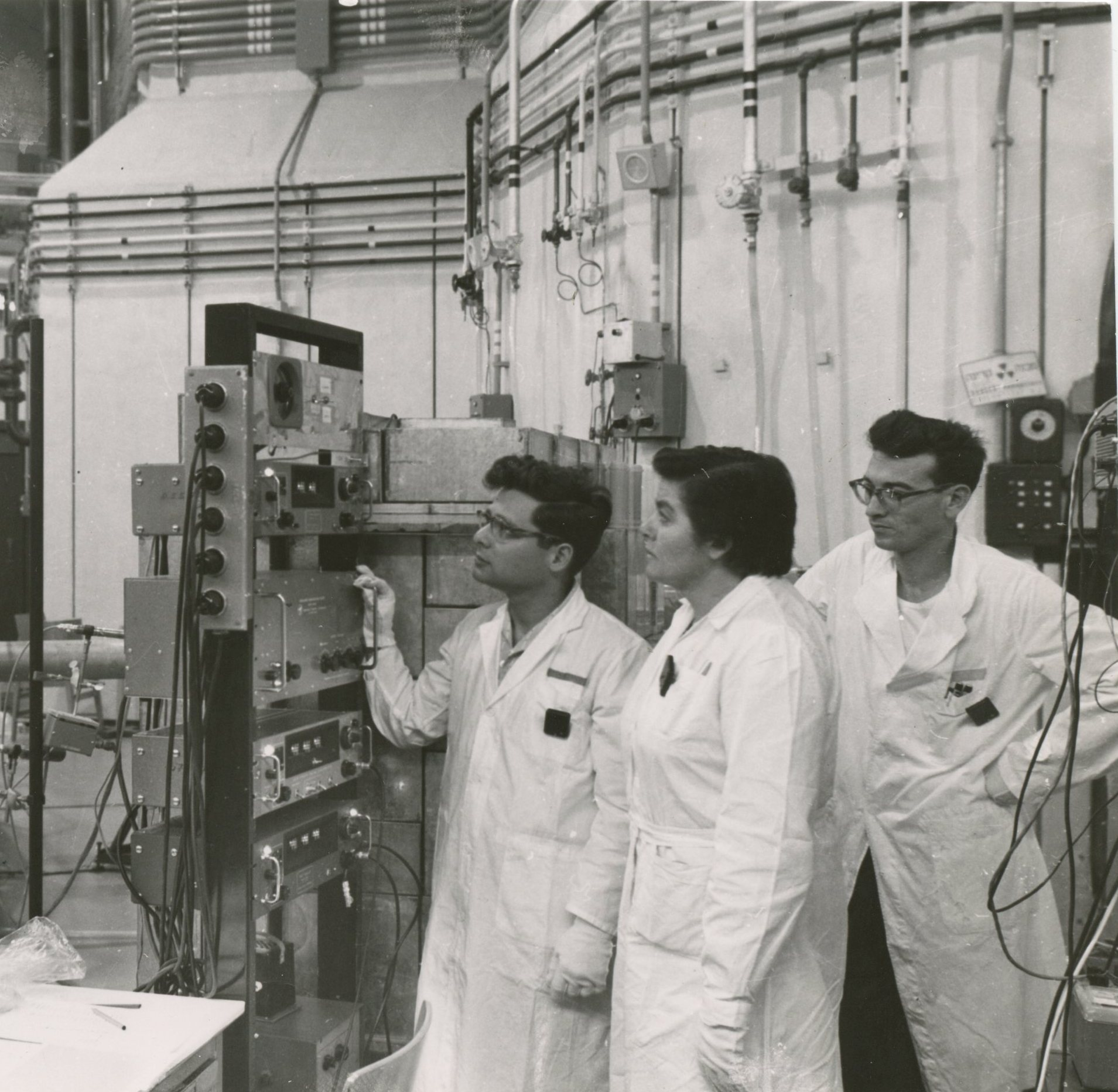
Aviva Gileadi in the Soreq Nuclear Research Center

Aviva E. Gileadi (Hebrew: אביבה גלעדי; born Eva Fischmann November 26, 1917 – June 8, 2001) was an Israeli nuclear scientist, a professor at the Israel Institute of Technology (Technion) in the department of Nuclear Engineering. She was a specialist in the use of nuclear reactors for energy production and desalination. She was the first woman in the Western Bloc to receive a license for the operation of a nuclear reactor and the only one with such a license in 1963.

== Biography ==
Eva Fischmann was born on November 26, 1917, in Budapest, Hungary, to Samuel Fischmann and Gizella (née Kupferstein). She studied at the University of Budapest where she received her PhD. During World War II she was sent to a concentration camp. She was scheduled to be deported to Auschwitz, but managed to escape and hide until the Red Army arrived in Budapest in January 1945. In 1946, she moved to Vienna, where she met and married Michael Gileadi, who was her second husband and worked as a radiographer.

In 1948 she emigrated to Israel, where she changed her name to Aviva. Aviva Gileadi taught at the high school of Kibbutz Givat HaShlosha and also worked for a time at the Weizmann Institute of Science.

In 1955, Gileadi moved to Haifa, and started working at the Technion, initially at the Department of Physics, and in 1958, upon the founding of the Department of Nuclear Engineering, she became a professor in that department.

In 1960, she won a scholarship to study for a year at the Argonne National Laboratory, and to research for a semester at the department of Nuclear Physics at the University of Michigan.

When the scholarship came to an end, she accepted an offer of another year to earn a degree in Nuclear sciences. During that time she enrolled on a course for operating nuclear reactors and she received an operator licence. Newspapers in 1963 claimed that Gileadi was the only woman in the western world to hold such a license.

In 1965 Gileadi was invited by the US government to assist in activating the Boiling Nuclear Superheater (BONUS) Reactor Facility in Puerto Rico. As part of her job, she instructed a team of engineers in the operation the nuclear reactor. In addition, she taught a Master of Science class in Nuclear Engineering.

Gileadi died in 2001, in Tampa, Florida.

== Personal life ==
Gileadi was married twice. She married Hungarian mathematician and teacher Ivan Seres (1907–1966). Before emigrating to Israel, she divorced Seres. In Israel, she married Michael Gileadi, an X-Ray technician originally from Poland. They had two children.

== Selected publications ==
- Gileadi, Michael, and Aviva E. Gileadi. "Collimation in Reducing Male Gonadal Doses in Puerto Rico-1968". Health Physics 25.1 (1973): 43–49.
- Aviva E. Gileadi and Wilson K. Talley, "Nuclear Excavation of a Sea-Level Isthmian Canal", Journal of the Waterways and Harbors Division, 1969, Vol. 95, Issue 3, pp. 329–336
- Gileadi, Aviva E., and Fernando López Carrasco. "Determination of the transfer function and certain kinetics parameters of the L-77 reactor". Puerto Rico Nuclear Center, 1968.
