= Diana Aviv =

South African American business executive

- Born: Johannesburg, South Africa
- Education: BA, 1974, University of the Witwatersrand; MSW, 1977, Columbia University
- Known for: Former CEO of Feeding America; Former CEO of Independent Sector
- Spouse: Sterling Speirn

Diana Aviv is a South African American business executive. She is the former CEO of Feeding America and Independent Sector.

== Early life and education ==
Aviv was born to a Polish refugee father fleeing with his family to South Africa from the Holocaust. Growing up in Johannesburg, she first learned about Nelson Mandela while a member of the Habonim youth movement. She graduated from King David High School Victory Park in 1968 and the University of the Witwatersrand in 1974. Following this, she moved to North American and enrolled at Columbia University School of Social Work. She studied social work in Johannesburg as it was the only legal way to get involved with the anti-apartheid movement without ending up in prison.

== Career ==
Following her Master's degree, Aviv was a clinical social worker at the Southeast Nassau Guidance Center and executive director of the Alternative to Domestic Violence. In the early 1990s, Aviv became the assistant director of the National Jewish Community Relations Advisory Council. She was eventually promoted to the rank of vice president for public policy with the United Jewish Communities. Aviv eventually met Nelson Mandela in June 1990 after his release from prison.

In 2003, Aviv became the President and chief executive officer (CEO) of Independent Sector and remained there until 2015 to become the CEO of Feeding America. She remained at Feeding America until 2018, when she resigned due to personal issues. Aviv then joined the faculty at Indiana University–Purdue University Indianapolis as a Distinguished Visiting Practitioner and Visiting Fellow through 2018.

== Personal life ==
Aviv is married to Sterling Speirn and they have two children together.
