= Haim Aviv =

Israeli scientist

- חיים אביב
- Born: 1940; Romania
- Died: 2021 (aged 80–81); Rehovot, Israel
- Citizenship: Israel
- Scientific career
- Fields: Molecular Biology, Drug development, Biotechnology, Pharmaceutical industry, Functional food
- Institutions: Weizmann Institute of Science

Haim Aviv (Hebrew: חיים אביב) (born Haim Greenspan; 1940–2021) was an Israeli scientist who specialized in the field of molecular biology. Aviv is considered to have a fundamental role in the shaping of the biotechnology industry in Israel, as he was widely involved in this industry since the late 1970s to this day.

== Birth and education ==
Aviv was born in Arad, Romania in 1940, and migrated to Israel at the age of ten. He was raised in the city of Rehovot, where he resided until his death in 2021. In his early twenties, he developed an interest in the field of agriculture, and planned a future in this field, almost with no connection to science. After completing an M.Sc. in The Faculty of Agriculture at the Hebrew University of Jerusalem, he began his doctorate studies in the Weizmann Institute of Science in Rehovot. At first Aviv was interested in the study of plant biology, but he soon found himself fascinated with molecular biology. In 1970 Aviv completed his doctorate, which focused on protein synthesis, and was offered a postdoctoral fellowship at the National Institutes of Health (NIH) in the US, Dr. Philip Leder's lab. In 1973 he returned to Israel, to the Weizmann Institute of Science, as a senior scientist and was then appointed associate professor with tenure.

In his spare time, Aviv studied Judaism and Jewish history, especially of The Holocaust. He also collected ancient Judaica books.

== Academic work ==
During his work in NIH, Aviv focused on the research of molecular processes related to differentiation, and synthesis control of Globins and Immunoglobulins, under the guidance of Dr. Philip Leder. This work was published in a series of papers, some of which were of the most quoted in the field of molecular biology for decades.

Aviv developed a method for the purification of messenger RNA (mRNA) which enabled research of control mechanisms of the translation of RNA to protein, and studied the role of mRNA in the differentiation of cells and tissues. In cooperation with Edward Scolnick's lab he performed research which first made it possible to synthesize complementary DNA (cDNA), a method which was later widely used in the research of gene control mechanisms. After his return to Israel, he continued to study the field of mRNA differentiation and synthesis.

During the late 1970s, Aviv entered the field of Recombinant DNA (genetic engineering) and applied research, and produced a microorganism (E. coli) containing the gene for Bovine Growth Hormone. The patented method he developed is used for the industrial production of growth hormone, in order to increase milk production by cows. Bovine growth hormone is in wide use in today's dairy industry.

== Advancement of Israeli biotechnology industry ==
In 1980, Aviv initiated and started "Biotechnology General Corp.", the first Israeli Biotechnology company focusing on Recombinant DNA (genetic engineering), which exists to this day. The foundation of the company was encouraged by Ephraim Katzir, formerly the president of Israel, and was supported by a group of investors led by Mr. Fred Adler, one of the leading Venture Capitalists.

After he retired from "Biotechnology General Ltd.", Aviv founded "Diatech Ltd." which specialized in medical diagnostic tools, and "Pharmos Corp."- In which he served as chairman and CEO. Pharmos initially focused on development of drugs for the treatment of Eye disease (Lotemax), but was mostly known for its later work to develop an innovative drug invented by Professor Raphael Mechoulam from the Hebrew University of Jerusalem (Dexanabinol), a synthetic canabinoid to treat head injury victims.

Despite promising results in Phase 2 clinical trials, the large scale phase 3 clinical trials did not meet expectations. The lack of success in the trials provoked a negative response from the company's investors and the Israeli media. Aviv left his position at Pharmos in 2007. However, these clinical trials remain to this day the largest trials performed in the field of pharmaceutical treatment of head injury. Serious traumatic head injuries remain to this day a medical challenge.

In 2000, Aviv founded "Predix Corp.", which focused on development of pharmaceuticals using advanced computerization and three-dimensional algorithms, invented by Dr. Oren Becker.

As of 2011, Aviv focused his work in the company "Herbamed Ltd.", as chairman and major shareholder. Herbamed is an Israeli company which develops health-supporting food products (Functional Foods) and Nutraceuticals, which are based on scientific research and clinical evidence. The products are marketed as snack bars and beverages under the brand Nutravida. The Functional Food segment is a rapidly growing field, which is expected to have a fundamental effect on population well-being.

Other than his position at Herbamed, Aviv also serves on the board of directors of Yeda Research and Development Company Ltd., which is the commercial arm of the Weizmann Institute of Science, The Ben-Gurion University of the Negev and at several companies in the field of drug development and medical devices.

He chaired and was a member of the Israel National Committee for Biotechnology and other advisory committees on this subject. Among his major recommendations was the establishment of dedicated investment funds with the aid of government funding, a recommendation which is currently being implemented with the foundation of two large-scale funds which include government aid.
