= Aviv =

Hebrew word meaning "spring (the season) "

Aviv (Hebrew: אביב) means "spring (season)" in Hebrew. Aviv is the first month of the year in the Pentateuch, and is later called Nisan in the book of Esther and in subsequent post-exilic history up to the present day. These names are sometimes used interchangeably, although Aviv refers to the three-month season, and Nisan is called the "first month of Aviv." Aviv is also used as a given name, surname, and place name, as in Tel Aviv.

== Meanings ==
- The basic meaning of the word aviv is the stage in the growth of grain when the seeds have reached full size and are filled with starch, but have not dried yet. During the plague of hail (Exodus 9:31), the barley was said to be [in the] aviv [stage] and the flax [in the] giv`ol. This resulted in their destruction.
- The month in the Hebrew calendar when the barley has reached or passed this stage is called Aviv, or the "month of the aviv". This month is considered the first month of the ecclesiastical civil year (see Hebrew calendar#Months). It begins about the time of the March equinox (March 21). Since the Babylonian captivity, this month has mainly been called Nisan. On the “day after the Shabbat” (the 16th of the month of Nissan according to the rabbis, and the first Sunday of Passover according to the Karaites), the harvest was begun by gathering a sheaf of barley for the Omer offering,

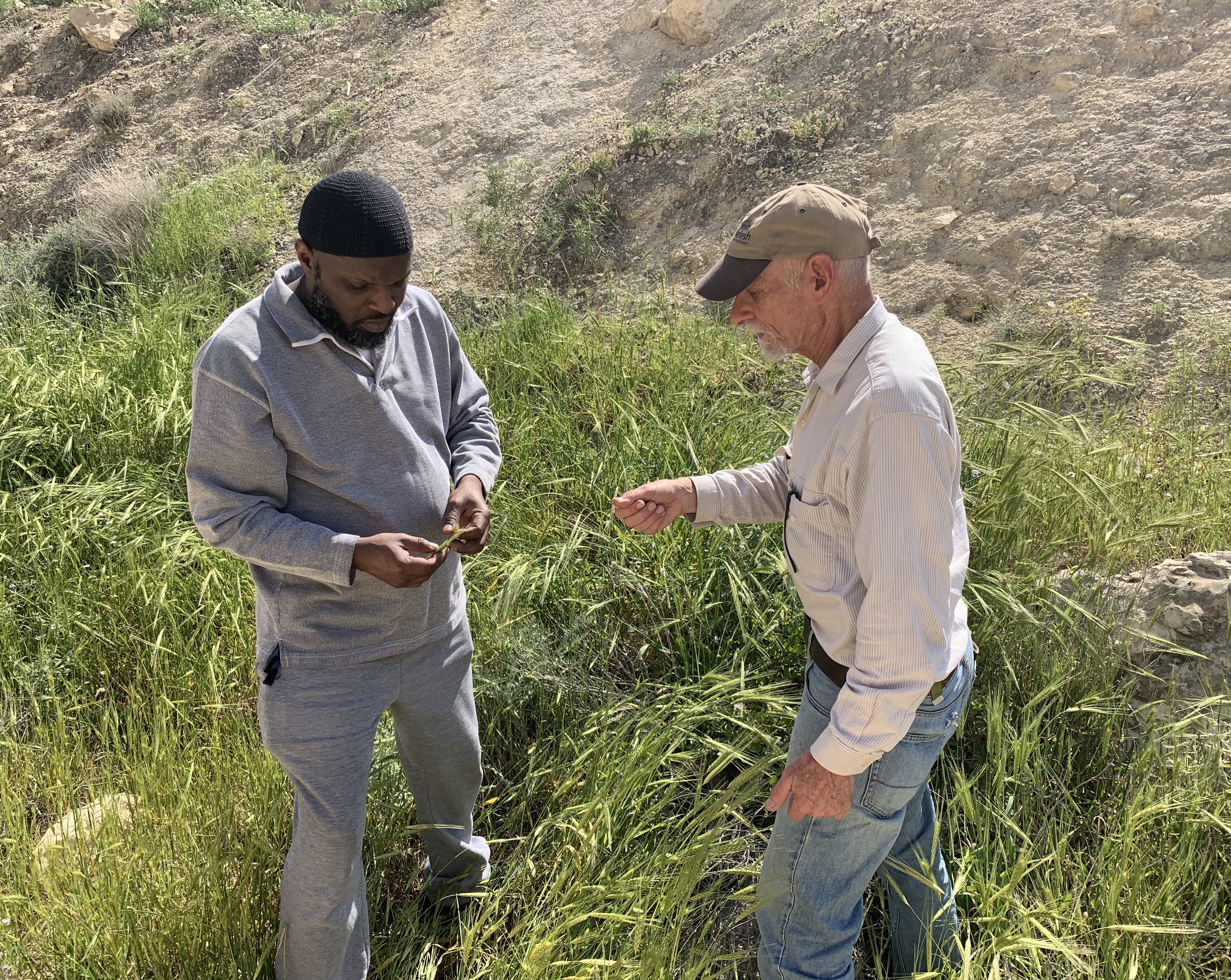
Karaites searching for Aviv barley at Ain Mabua, Judean Hills, Israel on 21 March 2019

- Abib or Aviv may also be the same star as Spica, the ear of grain in the constellation Virgo/Virgin/Woman.
- "Aviv" in modern Hebrew accordingly also means spring, one of the four seasons. Thus the major modern Israeli city of Tel Aviv means "Spring Hill".
- Since Passover is always celebrated on 15–21 (or 22 outside Israel) Nisan, near the beginning of spring, "Holiday of Aviv". Pesach or Passover is always on the 14th of Nisan. The first day of Chag ha Matzot or the Feast of Unleavened Bread is always the day after that, the 15th of Nisan. Hebrew: חג האביב, romanized: Chag Ha'Aviv is an additional name for Passover.

== As a name ==
Aviv is a Hebrew male and female name. The feminine version of the name is Aviva. Aviv is also an old and uncommon Russian Christian male given name "Ави́в" (Aviv), that possibly borrowed from Biblical Hebrew, where it derived from the word abīb, meaning an ear or a time of year where grains come into ear, also known as "Aviv" (or Nisan—the first month of the Hebrew calendar). The diminutives of "Aviv" in Russian are Aviva (Ави́ва) and Viva (Ви́ва). The patronymics derived from "Aviv" are "Ави́вович" (Avivovich; masculine) and "Ави́вовна" (Avivovna; feminine).

== See also ==
- Aviv (name)
