= Aviv Bushinsky =

Israeli businessman

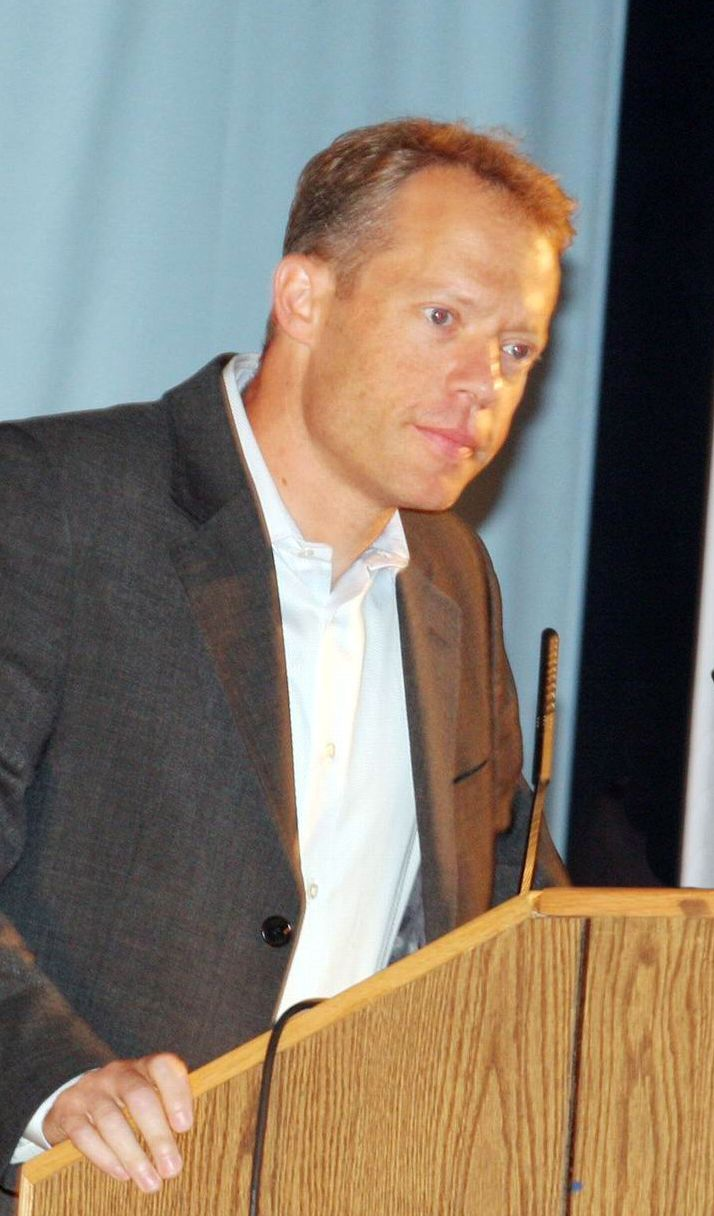
Aviv Bushinsky

Aviv Bushinsky (Hebrew: אביב בושינסקי; born April 13, 1967) is a journalist, CEO, businessman and an undergraduate program communications lecturer. He is the chairman of the Israel Squash Association. He served as chairman of Maccabi Tel Aviv and as chairman of the Israeli Chess Federation.

== Biography ==
Bushinsky is the son of Jay Bushinsky, a reporter and foreign correspondent in Israel who opened CNN's Jerusalem bureau. He grew up in Savion and went to Yehud public high school, served in the Israel Defense Forces (IDF) as an air force major. After his discharge he graduated with a bachelor's degree in Political Science and International relations at the Hebrew University of Jerusalem, and with a graduate degree in public policy from Bar-Ilan University. He worked as a journalist at the former radio station Kol Israel and at Israel Army Radio (Galei Tzahal), acted as Benjamin Netanyahu's spokesperson in the Prime Minister's office and was Chief of Staff of the Minister of Finance, Benjamin Netanyahu. In 2004 he shifted towards a more business-like career. Bushinsky serves today as the CEO of HESEG Foundation in Israel and as the representative of business man, Gerald Schwartz.

== Journalism ==
In 1991, during the Gulf War, he began reporting on Jerusalem affairs at Kol Israel and was reporting from the field as well. With Moshe Nussbaum's transfer to channel 2, Bushinsky was appointed as the stations reporter on police affairs. He served in this position for seven years.

In 1997 Ayala Hasson, Channel 1 TV reporter exposed the "Bar-On Hevron" case, in which there was a suspicion of a conspiracy involving Benjamin Netanyahu and the Shas ultra-Orthodox political party for the appointment of Roni Bar-On as the office's legal adviser in the attempt to lessen the plea bargain in Arie Deri's trial. In his reports on the radio, Bushinsky tended to minimize the value of the story, and at a certain point he reported that there would be no indictments filed in the case (none were filed). This angered the CEO of the broadcasting agency, Motti Kirshenbaum (Bushinsky and Hasson's supervisor) stated "Bushinsky's reports are not a something that the radio can be proud of." Bushinsky told his critics that he reported only the truth, and that sometimes, it can hurt."

Bushinsky left Kol Israel after receiving an offer to work as a diplomatic affairs reporter at Galei Tzahal, replacing Udi Segal who moved to Channel 2.

== Politics ==
In 1998 Bushinsky was appointed as the media advisor for Prime Minister Benjamin Netanyahu. In his time as spokesman for the Prime Minister's office, he dealt with Netanyahu's deteriorating image in the public's eye and in the media as well as gossip stories about his wife Sara in the media. Bushinsky served in this position until the end of Netanyahu's term when he lost to Ehud Barak in 1999. He continued to serve Netanyahu after his retirement from the political world and through his return. Between the years 2003-2004 he served as Chief of Staff for the Minister of Finance, Benjamin Netanyahu during Ariel Sharon's second term as Prime Minister.

== Business career ==
Following his retirement from political work, he began representing Canadian investors in Israel, most prominently business man Gerald Schwartz. He founded the investment firm "Hi & Ventures Ltd". Among others, he was the liaison between the Canadian Can West group and the Eli Azur group in the purchasing transaction of the newspaper the "Jerusalem Post".

In 2006 he served as chairman of the board of directors for "Lifewave Ltd, a startup company that deals with the production and marketing of medical equipment. In 2006 he issued the company in the Tel Aviv Stock Exchange. In April 2007 the company's name headlined in the financial magazines, in the context of market manipulation. From the beginning of trading in the stock market, the value of the stock increased by 900% in 4 months, and in 2 days dropped by about 70%. The Israeli Security Authority (ISA) requested clarifications from the company which were delivered. In August 2007 Bushinsky decided to quit his position as Chairman of "Lifewave" due to disagreements with the other shareholders.

== Public and sports activities ==
Bushinsky was a Chess player throughout his childhood. In July 2005, he was chosen as the chairman of the Israeli Chess Federation. In the three terms he served as chairman, two world championships were held in Israel, and a Guinness world record was broken in simultaneous Chess playing.

Aviv’s brother, Shay, is one of the developers of “Deep Junior”, Chess software. The software won seven times in the world championships for Computer Software.

Throughout his adolescence, Bushinsky was a junior champion of table tennis tournaments. He holds the title of “Jerusalem Champion in Squash”.

His sister, Dahlia Bushinsky, was the trainer for Macabbi Ashdod women’s basketball team and trains a team of Cadettes. In late 2007, Bushinsky began representing billionaire Alex Schneider in negotiations to purchase the soccer team Maccabi Tel Aviv from Luni Hertzikovich. In January 2008, he was assigned as the chairman of the Maccabi Tel Aviv Soccer Club.

In 2010, Bushinsky brought the Canadian millionaire, Mitchel Goldheir to purchase the club from Schneider. One year later, he resigned from his position as the chairman of the Maccabi Tel Aviv Soccer Club and a few months after that he resigned from his position in the Israeli Soccer Association.

In the 18th Maccabiah, he volunteered to serve as chairman of the department of public relations. As part of the celebrations of Tel Aviv's 100 years, he was a member of the municipal corporation "City World."

Bushinsky acts today as a commentator in various media channels, while teaching communication and public relations at the Ono Academic College. He is also a member of "The friends of Bezalel" (Academy of Art).
