= List of songs recorded by Duran Duran =

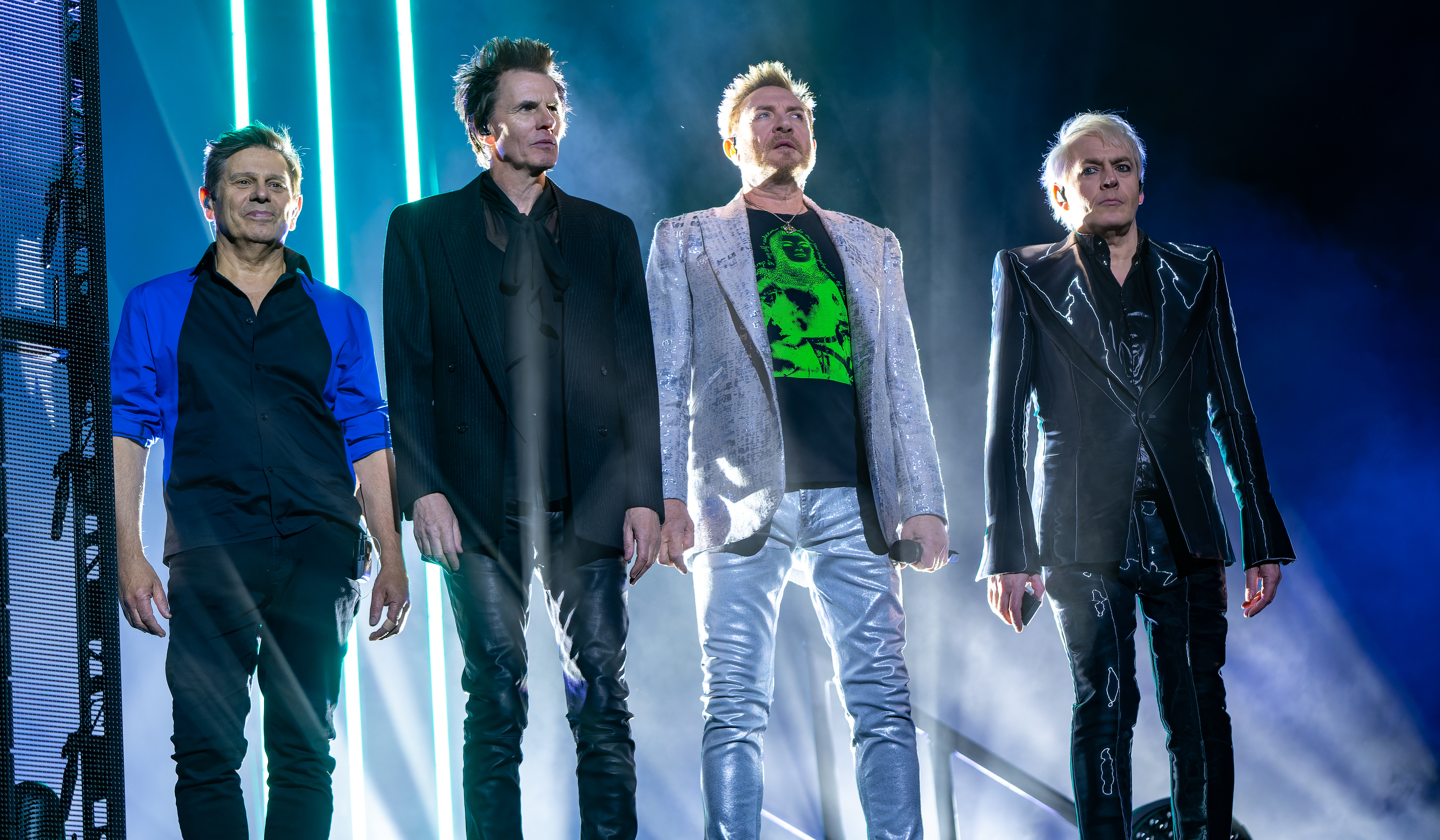
Duran Duran at The O2 Arena in London, 2023

Duran Duran are an English pop rock band who have recorded over 200 songs during their career. Since their formation in 1978, Duran Duran have credited all of their songs to all members equally, aside from covers. They emerged as members of the New Romantic scene with their debut album Duran Duran (1981). Produced by Colin Thurston, the album features a mix of synthesiser-led pop tunes ("Girls on Film", "Planet Earth") and more atmospheric tracks ("Tel Aviv"), influenced by artists such as David Bowie, Roxy Music, Japan and Chic. Its follow-up, Rio (1982), cemented Duran Duran as forerunners in the Second British Invasion. Also produced by Thurston, the synth-pop and new wave record featured more experimentation than their debut, combining faster, upbeat songs ("Rio", "Hungry Like the Wolf") with slower, atmospheric tracks ("Save a Prayer"). The band changed direction with Seven and the Ragged Tiger (1983), a dance-driven record about, in the words of frontman Simon Le Bon, "an adventure story about a little commando team". Between 1984 and 1985, Duran Duran worked with Nile Rodgers on a remix of Seven's "The Reflex" and "The Wild Boys", and recorded the title song of the James Bond film A View to a Kill (1985).

Rodgers returned to produce Notorious (1986), which saw Duran Duran change direction again with a more funk and brass-driven sound and more mature lyrics about introspection ("So Misled") and exploitation ("Skin Trade"). The band continued experimenting with synthesiser-based funk, electronic, techno, and rock on Big Thing (1988) and Liberty (1990) with songs such as "All She Wants Is" and "Serious". Duran Duran re-emerged in 1993 with Duran Duran (The Wedding Album), a 1990s-style dance-pop record containing songs such as "Ordinary World", "Come Undone" and "Too Much Information". It was followed by Thank You (1995), a covers album featuring renditions of songs by artists such as Bob Dylan, Melle Mel and Public Enemy. Medazzaland (1997) and Pop Trash (2000), both produced by TV Mania, continued the band's experimentation with electronica, hard rock, industrial rock, synth-pop, Britpop and soul.

Duran Duran have continued their musical experimentation into the 21st century. Astronaut (2004) returned to the synth-pop sound of the band's early years; Red Carpet Massacre (2007) featured contemporary pop production by Timbaland and Justin Timberlake, who guested on the single "Falling Down"; and All You Need Is Now (2010) again returned to the dance and synth-pop stylings of their early years with production by Mark Ronson. For the pop and dance-oriented Paper Gods (2015), Duran Duran worked with an array of guest collaborators, including singer Janelle Monáe ("Pressure Off") and guitarist John Frusciante, with production by Ronson, Mr Hudson and old collaborator Nile Rodgers. On Future Past (2021), the band worked with producer Erol Alkan and guitarist Graham Coxon, crafting a modern disco album with guest appearances from Tove Lo, Ivorian Doll and Chai. Their latest release, Danse Macabre (2023), is a Halloween-themed record featuring originals, remakes of older material ("Night Boat") and covers of songs by artists such as the Rolling Stones, Billie Eilish and Talking Heads.

== Songs ==
Key
‡	Indicates songs not written by Duran Duran

Name of song, writer(s), original release, producer(s) and year of release
Song	Writer(s)	Original release	Producer(s)	Year	Ref.
"911 Is a Joke" (Public Enemy cover)	William Jonathan Drayton Jr. Keith Shocklee; Eric Sadler ‡	Thank You	Duran Duran; John Jones	1995	
"All Along the Water"	Simon Le Bon; Nick Rhodes; John Taylor; Warren Cuccurullo; Sterling Campbell	Liberty	Chris Kimsey; Duran Duran	1990	
"All of You"	Simon Le Bon; Nick Rhodes; John Taylor; Roger Taylor; Graham Coxon	Future Past	Duran Duran; Erol Alkan	2021	
"All She Wants Is"	Simon Le Bon; Nick Rhodes; John Taylor	Big Thing	Duran Duran; Jonathan Elias; Daniel Abraham	1988	
"All You Need Is Now"	Simon Le Bon; Nick Rhodes; John Taylor; Roger Taylor; Mark Ronson; Dominic Brown	All You Need Is Now	Mark Ronson; Duran Duran	2010	
"American Science"	Simon Le Bon; Nick Rhodes; John Taylor	Notorious	Duran Duran; Nile Rodgers	1986	
"Anniversary"	Simon Le Bon; Nick Rhodes; John Taylor; Roger Taylor; Graham Coxon; Erol Alkan	Future Past	Duran Duran; Erol Alkan	2021	
"Anyone Out There" (Note: Titled "Is There Anyone Out There" on the US release of Duran Duran (1981))	Simon Le Bon; Nick Rhodes; John Taylor; Andy Taylor; Roger Taylor	Duran Duran	Colin Thurston	1981	
"Astronaut"	Simon Le Bon; Nick Rhodes; John Taylor; Andy Taylor; Roger Taylor	Astronaut	Duran Duran; Dallas Austin	2004	
"Ball and Chain"	Simon Le Bon; Nick Rhodes; Warren Cuccurullo	Medazzaland (Japanese edition)	TV Mania; Syn Pro Tokyo	1997	
"Ball of Confusion" (The Temptations cover)	Norman Whitfield; Barrett Strong ‡	Thank You	Duran Duran; John Jones	1995	
"Be My Icon"	Simon Le Bon; Nick Rhodes; Warren Cuccurullo	Medazzaland	TV Mania; Syn Pro Tokyo	1997	
"Beautiful Lies"	Simon Le Bon; Nick Rhodes; John Taylor; Roger Taylor; Giorgio Moroder	Future Past	Duran Duran; Giorgio Moroder; Josh Blair	2021	
"Bedroom Toys"	Simon Le Bon; Nick Rhodes; John Taylor; Andy Taylor; Roger Taylor	Astronaut	Duran Duran; Don Gilmore; Nile Rodgers	2004	
"Being Followed"	Simon Le Bon; Nick Rhodes; John Taylor; Roger Taylor; Dominic Brown	All You Need Is Now	Mark Ronson; Duran Duran	2010	
"Before the Rain"	Simon Le Bon; Nick Rhodes; John Taylor; Roger Taylor	All You Need Is Now	Mark Ronson; Duran Duran	2010	
"Big Bang Generation"	Simon Le Bon; Nick Rhodes; John Taylor; Warren Cuccurullo	Medazzaland	TV Mania; Syn Pro Tokyo	1997	
"Big Thing"	Simon Le Bon; Nick Rhodes; John Taylor	Big Thing	Duran Duran; Jonathan Elias; Daniel Abraham	1988	
"Black Moonlight" (featuring Nile Rodgers)	Simon Le Bon; Nick Rhodes; John Taylor; Roger Taylor; Nile Rodgers	Danse Macabre	Duran Duran; Josh Blair; Nile Rodgers	2023	
"Blame the Machines"	Simon Le Bon; Nick Rhodes; John Taylor; Roger Taylor; Dominic Brown	All You Need Is Now	Mark Ronson; Duran Duran	2010	
"Box Full O' Honey"	Simon Le Bon; Nick Rhodes; John Taylor; Roger Taylor; Nate Hills	Red Carpet Massacre	Duran Duran; Nate "Danja" Hills; Jimmy Douglass	2007	
"Boys Keep Swinging" (David Bowie cover)	David Bowie; Brian Eno ‡	We Were So Turned On: A Tribute to David Bowie	Duran Duran	2010	
"Breath After Breath"	Simon Le Bon; Nick Rhodes; John Taylor; Warren Cuccurullo; Milton Nascimento	Duran Duran (The Wedding Album)	Duran Duran; John Jones	1993	
"Buried in the Sand"	Simon Le Bon; Nick Rhodes; Warren Cuccurullo	Medazzaland	TV Mania; Syn Pro Tokyo; Anthony J. Resta; Bob St. John	1997	
"Burning the Ground"	Simon Le Bon; Nick Rhodes; John Taylor; John Barry	Non-album single	Duran Duran; John Jones; Sterling Campbell	1989	
"Bury a Friend" (Billie Eilish cover)	Billie Eilish; Finneas O'Connell ‡	Danse Macabre	Duran Duran; Josh Blair	2023	
"Butterfly Girl"	Simon Le Bon; Nick Rhodes; John Taylor; Roger Taylor; Dominic Brown	Paper Gods	Duran Duran; Josh Blair	2015	
"Can You Deal with It"	Simon Le Bon; Nick Rhodes; John Taylor; Warren Cuccurullo; Sterling Campbell	Liberty	Chris Kimsey; Duran Duran	1990	
"Careless Memories"	Simon Le Bon; Nick Rhodes; John Taylor; Andy Taylor; Roger Taylor	Duran Duran	Colin Thurston	1981	
"The Chauffeur"	Simon Le Bon; Nick Rhodes; John Taylor; Andy Taylor; Roger Taylor	Rio	Colin Thurston	1982	
"Chains"	Simon Le Bon; Nick Rhodes; John Taylor; Andy Taylor; Roger Taylor	Astronaut	Duran Duran; Don Gilmore	2004	
"Change the Skyline" (featuring Jonas Bjerre)	Simon Le Bon; Nick Rhodes; John Taylor; Roger Taylor; Mr Hudson	Paper Gods	Duran Duran; Josh Blair; Nile Rodgers	2015	
"Cinderella Ride"	Simon Le Bon; Nick Rhodes; John Taylor; Roger Taylor	Paper Gods (Target edition)	Duran Duran; Josh Blair	2015	
"Come Undone"	Simon Le Bon; Nick Rhodes; John Taylor; Warren Cuccurullo	Duran Duran (The Wedding Album)	Duran Duran; John Jones	1993	
"Confession in the Afterlife"	Simon Le Bon; Nick Rhodes; John Taylor; Roger Taylor; Mr Hudson	Danse Macabre	Duran Duran; Josh Blair; Mr Hudson	2023	
"Crystal Ship" (The Doors cover)	Jim Morrison ‡	Thank You	Duran Duran; John Jones	1995	
"Cry Baby Cry"	Simon Le Bon; Nick Rhodes; John Taylor; Roger Taylor; Nate Hills	Red Carpet Massacre (Japanese and iTunes editions)	Duran Duran; Nate "Danja" Hills	2007	(Note: Writing and production credits: Japanese release: iTunes release:)
"Danceophobia"	Simon Le Bon; Nick Rhodes; John Taylor; Roger Taylor; Dominic Brown; Mr Hudson	Paper Gods	Duran Duran; Josh Blair; Mr Hudson	2015	
"Danse Macabre"	Simon Le Bon; Nick Rhodes; John Taylor; Roger Taylor; Mr Hudson	Danse Macabre	Duran Duran; Josh Blair; Mr Hudson	2023	
"Decadence"	Simon Le Bon; Nick Rhodes; John Taylor	B-side of "Burning the Ground"	Ben Chapman; Raine Shine	1989	
"Diamond Dogs" (David Bowie cover)	David Bowie ‡	Thank You (Japanese edition)	Duran Duran; John Jones	1995	
"A Diamond in the Mind"	Simon Le Bon; Nick Rhodes; John Taylor; Roger Taylor; Mark Ronson; Dominic Brown	All You Need Is Now (physical edition)	Mark Ronson; Duran Duran	2011	
"Dirty Great Monster"	Simon Le Bon; Nick Rhodes; John Taylor; Roger Taylor; Nate Hills	Red Carpet Massacre	Duran Duran; Nate "Danja" Hills; Jimmy Douglass	2007	
"Do You Believe in Shame?"	Simon Le Bon; Nick Rhodes; John Taylor	Big Thing	Duran Duran; Jonathan Elias; Daniel Abraham	1988	
"Downtown"	Simon Le Bon; Nick Rhodes; John Taylor; Warren Cuccurullo; Sterling Campbell	Liberty	Chris Kimsey; Duran Duran	1990	
"Drive By"	Simon Le Bon; Nick Rhodes; John Taylor; Warren Cuccurullo	Thank You	Duran Duran; John Jones	1995	
"Drowning Man"	Simon Le Bon; Nick Rhodes; John Taylor; Warren Cuccurullo	Duran Duran (The Wedding Album)	Duran Duran; John Jones	1993	
"Drug (It's Just a State of Mind)"	Simon Le Bon; Nick Rhodes; John Taylor	Big Thing	Duran Duran; Jonathan Elias; Daniel Abraham	1988	
"Early Summer Nerves"	Simon Le Bon; Nick Rhodes; John Taylor; Roger Taylor; Dominic Brown	All You Need Is Now (Best Buy edition)	Mark Ronson; Duran Duran	2011	
"The Edge of America"	Simon Le Bon; Nick Rhodes; John Taylor	Big Thing	Duran Duran; Jonathan Elias; Daniel Abraham	1988	
"Electric Barbarella"	Simon Le Bon; Nick Rhodes; Warren Cuccurullo	Medazzaland	TV Mania; Syn Pro Tokyo	1997	
"Face for Today"	Simon Le Bon; Nick Rhodes; John Taylor; Roger Taylor; Dominic Brown	Paper Gods	Duran Duran; Josh Blair	2015	
"Faith in This Colour"	Simon Le Bon; Nick Rhodes; John Taylor; Andy Taylor; Roger Taylor	B-side of "Is There Something I Should Know?"	Colin Thurston	1983	
"Falling" (featuring Mike Garson)	Simon Le Bon; Nick Rhodes; John Taylor; Roger Taylor	Future Past	Duran Duran; Erol Alkan	2021	
"Falling Angel"	Simon Le Bon; Nick Rhodes; John Taylor; Warren Cuccurullo	Duran Duran (The Wedding Album) (UK limited edition)	Duran Duran; John Jones	1994	
"Falling Down"	Simon Le Bon; Nick Rhodes; John Taylor; Roger Taylor; Justin Timberlake	Red Carpet Massacre	Justin Timberlake	2007	
"Fame" (David Bowie cover)	David Bowie; Carlos Alomar; John Lennon ‡	B-side of "Careless Memories"	Colin Thurston	1981	
"Faster Than Light"	Simon Le Bon; Nick Rhodes; John Taylor; Andy Taylor; Roger Taylor	B-side of "Girls on Film"	Colin Thurston	1981	
"Femme Fatale" (The Velvet Underground cover)	Lou Reed ‡	Duran Duran (The Wedding Album)	Duran Duran; John Jones	1993	
"Finest Hour"	Simon Le Bon; Nick Rhodes; John Taylor; Andy Taylor; Roger Taylor	Astronaut	Duran Duran; Don Gilmore	2004	
"First Impression"	Simon Le Bon; Nick Rhodes; John Taylor; Warren Cuccurullo; Sterling Campbell	Liberty	Chris Kimsey; Duran Duran	1990	
"Five Years" (David Bowie cover)	David Bowie ‡	Future Past (Japanese edition)	Duran Duran; Erol Alkan	2021	
"Flute Interlude"	Simon Le Bon; Nick Rhodes; John Taylor	Big Thing	Duran Duran; Jonathan Elias; Daniel Abraham	1988	
"Fragment"	Simon Le Bon; Nick Rhodes; Warren Cuccurullo	Pop Trash	TV Mania; Syn Productions	2000	
"Friends of Mine"	Simon Le Bon; Nick Rhodes; John Taylor; Andy Taylor; Roger Taylor	Duran Duran	Colin Thurston	1981	
"Future Past"	Simon Le Bon; Nick Rhodes; John Taylor; Roger Taylor; Graham Coxon; Erol Alkan	Future Past	Duran Duran; Erol Alkan	2021	
"Ghost Town" (The Specials cover)	Jerry Dammers ‡	Danse Macabre	Duran Duran; Josh Blair	2023	
"Girl Panic!"	Simon Le Bon; Nick Rhodes; John Taylor; Roger Taylor; Mark Ronson; Dominic Brown	All You Need Is Now	Mark Ronson; Duran Duran	2010	
"Girls on Film"	Simon Le Bon; Nick Rhodes; John Taylor; Andy Taylor; Roger Taylor	Duran Duran	Colin Thurston	1981	
"Give It All Up" (featuring Tove Lo)	Simon Le Bon; Nick Rhodes; John Taylor; Roger Taylor; Graham Coxon; Erol Alkan; Tove Lo	Future Past	Duran Duran; Erol Alkan; Peter Karlsson	2021	
"Hallucinating Elvis"	Simon Le Bon; Nick Rhodes; Warren Cuccurullo	Pop Trash	TV Mania; Syn Productions	2000	
"Hammerhead" (featuring Ivorian Doll)	Simon Le Bon; Nick Rhodes; John Taylor; Roger Taylor; Erol Alkan; Vanessa; MahiLei Jennings; Christopher Layton	Future Past	Duran Duran; Erol Alkan	2021	
"Hold Back the Rain"	Simon Le Bon; Nick Rhodes; John Taylor; Andy Taylor; Roger Taylor	Rio	Colin Thurston	1982	
"Hold Me"	Simon Le Bon; Nick Rhodes; John Taylor	Notorious	Duran Duran; Nile Rodgers	1986	
"Hothead"	Simon Le Bon; Nick Rhodes; John Taylor; Warren Cuccurullo; Sterling Campbell	Liberty	Chris Kimsey; Duran Duran	1990	
"Hungry Like the Wolf"	Simon Le Bon; Nick Rhodes; John Taylor; Andy Taylor; Roger Taylor	Rio	Colin Thurston	1982	
"I Don't Want Your Love"	Simon Le Bon; Nick Rhodes; John Taylor	Big Thing	Duran Duran; Jonathan Elias; Daniel Abraham	1988	
"I Take the Dice"	Simon Le Bon; Nick Rhodes; John Taylor; Andy Taylor; Roger Taylor	Seven and the Ragged Tiger	Alex Sadkin; Ian Little; Duran Duran	1983	
"I Want to Take You Higher" (Sly and the Family Stone cover)	Sylvester Stewart ‡	Thank You	Duran Duran; John Jones	1995	
"I Want to Take You Higher Again" (Sly and the Family Stone cover)	Sylvester Stewart ‡	Thank You	Duran Duran; John Jones	1995	
"Instant Karma!" (John Lennon cover)	John Lennon ‡	Instant Karma: The Amnesty International Campaign to Save Darfur	Duran Duran; Paul Logus	2007	
"Interlude One"	Simon Le Bon; Nick Rhodes; John Taylor	Big Thing	Duran Duran; Jonathan Elias; Daniel Abraham	1988	
"Invisible"	Simon Le Bon; Nick Rhodes; John Taylor; Roger Taylor; Erol Alkan	Future Past	Duran Duran; Erol Alkan	2021	
"Invocation"	Simon Le Bon; Nick Rhodes; John Taylor; Roger Taylor; Graham Coxon; Erol Alkan	Future Past (deluxe edition)	Duran Duran; Erol Alkan	2021	
"Is There Something I Should Know?"	Simon Le Bon; Nick Rhodes; John Taylor; Andy Taylor; Roger Taylor	Non-album single (Note: Appears on the 1983 US reissue of Duran Duran)	Colin Thurston	1983	
"(I'm Looking for) Cracks in the Pavement"	Simon Le Bon; Nick Rhodes; John Taylor; Andy Taylor; Roger Taylor	Seven and the Ragged Tiger	Alex Sadkin; Ian Little; Duran Duran	1983	
"Khanada"	Simon Le Bon; Nick Rhodes; John Taylor; Andy Taylor; Roger Taylor	B-side of "Careless Memories"	Colin Thurston	1981	
"Kiss Goodbye"	Simon Le Bon; Nick Rhodes; Warren Cuccurullo	Pop Trash	TV Mania; Syn Productions	2000	
"Lady Xanax"	Simon Le Bon; Nick Rhodes; Warren Cuccurullo	Pop Trash	TV Mania; Syn Productions	2000	
"Lake Shore Driving"	Simon Le Bon; Nick Rhodes; John Taylor	Big Thing	Duran Duran; Jonathan Elias; Daniel Abraham	1988	
"Land"	Simon Le Bon; Nick Rhodes; John Taylor	Big Thing	Duran Duran; Jonathan Elias; Daniel Abraham	1988	
"Last Chance on the Stairway"	Simon Le Bon; Nick Rhodes; John Taylor; Andy Taylor; Roger Taylor	Rio	Colin Thurston	1982	
"Last Day on Earth"	Simon Le Bon; Nick Rhodes; Warren Cuccurullo	Pop Trash	TV Mania; Syn Productions	2000	
"Last Man Standing"	Simon Le Bon; Nick Rhodes; John Taylor; Roger Taylor; Nate Hills	Red Carpet Massacre	Duran Duran; Nate "Danja" Hills; Jimmy Douglass	2007	
"Last Night in the City" (featuring Kiesza)"	Simon Le Bon; Nick Rhodes; John Taylor; Roger Taylor; Kiesza; Mr Hudson	Paper Gods	Duran Duran; Josh Blair; Mr Hudson	2015	
"Late Bar"	Simon Le Bon; Nick Rhodes; John Taylor; Andy Taylor; Roger Taylor	B-side of "Planet Earth"	Colin Thurston	1981	
"Laughing Boy"	Simon Le Bon; Nick Rhodes; John Taylor; Roger Taylor; Graham Coxon	Future Past (deluxe edition)	Duran Duran; Erol Alkan	2021	
"Lava Lamp"	Simon Le Bon; Nick Rhodes; Warren Cuccurullo	Pop Trash	TV Mania; Syn Productions	2000	
"Lay Lady Lay" (Bob Dylan cover)	Bob Dylan ‡	Thank You	Duran Duran; John Jones	1995	
"Leave a Light On"	Simon Le Bon; Nick Rhodes; John Taylor; Roger Taylor; Dominic Brown	All You Need Is Now	Mark Ronson; Duran Duran	2010	
"Liberty"	Simon Le Bon; Nick Rhodes; John Taylor; Warren Cuccurullo; Sterling Campbell	Liberty	Chris Kimsey; Duran Duran	1990	
"Like an Angel"	Simon Le Bon; Nick Rhodes; John Taylor; Andy Taylor; Roger Taylor	B-side of "My Own Way"	Colin Thurston	1981	
"Lonely in Your Nightmare"	Simon Le Bon; Nick Rhodes; John Taylor; Andy Taylor; Roger Taylor	Rio	Colin Thurston	1982	
"Love Voodoo" (Note: A remake titled "Love Voudou" appears on Danse Macabre (2023).)	Simon Le Bon; Nick Rhodes; John Taylor; Warren Cuccurullo	Duran Duran (The Wedding Album)	Duran Duran; John Jones	1993	
"Make Me Smile (Come Up and See Me)" (live) (Steve Harley & Cockney Rebel cover)	Steve Harley ‡	B-side of "The Reflex"	Alex Sadkin; Ian Little; Duran Duran	1984	
"The Man Who Stole a Leopard" (featuring Kelis)	Simon Le Bon; Nick Rhodes; John Taylor; Roger Taylor	All You Need Is Now	Mark Ronson; Duran Duran	2010	
"A Matter of Feeling"	Simon Le Bon; Nick Rhodes; John Taylor	Notorious	Duran Duran; Nile Rodgers	1986	
"Mars Meets Venus"	Simon Le Bon; Nick Rhodes; Warren Cuccurullo	Pop Trash	TV Mania; Syn Productions	2000	
"Medazzaland"	Simon Le Bon; Nick Rhodes; John Taylor; Warren Cuccurullo	Medazzaland	TV Mania; Syn Pro Tokyo; Anthony J. Resta; Bob St. John	1997	
"Mediterranea"	Simon Le Bon; Nick Rhodes; John Taylor; Roger Taylor; Mark Ronson; Dominic Brown	All You Need Is Now (physical edition)	Mark Ronson; Duran Duran	2011	
"Meet El Presidente"	Simon Le Bon; Nick Rhodes; John Taylor	Notorious	Duran Duran; Nile Rodgers	1986	
"Michael You've Got a Lot to Answer For"	Simon Le Bon; Nick Rhodes; Warren Cuccurullo	Medazzaland	TV Mania; Syn Pro Tokyo	1997	
"Midnight Sun"	Simon Le Bon; Nick Rhodes; John Taylor; Warren Cuccurullo	Medazzaland	TV Mania; Syn Pro Tokyo	1997	
"More Joy!" (featuring Chai)	Simon Le Bon; Nick Rhodes; John Taylor; Roger Taylor; Graham Coxon; Erol Alkan	Future Past	Duran Duran; Erol Alkan; Chai	2021	
"My Antarctica"	Simon Le Bon; Nick Rhodes; John Taylor; Warren Cuccurullo; Sterling Campbell	Liberty	Chris Kimsey; Duran Duran	1990	
"My Own Way"	Simon Le Bon; Nick Rhodes; John Taylor; Andy Taylor; Roger Taylor	Non-album single Rio (Note: Originally released as a non-album single in November 1981, with "Like an Angel" as the B-side. A different version appears on Rio (1982).)	Colin Thurston	1981	
"The Needle and the Damage Done" (Neil Young cover)	Neil Young ‡	B-side of "Perfect Day" (CD1)	Duran Duran; John Jones	1995	
"Networker Nation"	Simon Le Bon; Nick Rhodes; John Taylor; Roger Taylor; Dominic Brown	All You Need Is Now (UK deluxe edition)	Mark Ronson; Duran Duran	2011	
"New Moon on Monday" (Note: A reworking titled "New Moon (Dark Phase)" was released as a single in September 2024 from the deluxe reissue of Danse Macabre.)	Simon Le Bon; Nick Rhodes; John Taylor; Andy Taylor; Roger Taylor	Seven and the Ragged Tiger	Alex Sadkin; Ian Little; Duran Duran	1983	
"New Religion"	Simon Le Bon; Nick Rhodes; John Taylor; Andy Taylor; Roger Taylor	Rio	Colin Thurston	1982	
"Nice"	Simon Le Bon; Nick Rhodes; John Taylor; Andy Taylor; Roger Taylor	Astronaut	Duran Duran; Don Gilmore	2004	
"Night Boat" (Note: Titled "(Waiting for the) Night Boat" on the US release of Duran Duran (1981)) (Note: A remake titled "Nightboat" appears on Danse Macabre (2023).)	Simon Le Bon; Nick Rhodes; John Taylor; Andy Taylor; Roger Taylor	Duran Duran	Colin Thurston	1981	
"Nite-Runner"	Simon Le Bon; Nick Rhodes; John Taylor; Roger Taylor; Nate Hills; Tim Mosley; Justin Timberlake	Red Carpet Massacre	Duran Duran; Nate "Danja" Hills; Timbaland; Justin Timberlake	2007	
"None of the Above"	Simon Le Bon; Nick Rhodes; John Taylor; Warren Cuccurullo	Duran Duran (The Wedding Album)	Duran Duran; John Jones	1993	
"Northern Lights"	Simon Le Bon; Nick Rhodes; John Taylor; Roger Taylor; Dominic Brown	Paper Gods (deluxe edition)	Duran Duran; Josh Blair	2015	
"Nothing Less"	Simon Le Bon; Nick Rhodes; John Taylor; Roger Taylor; Erol Alkan	Future Past	Duran Duran; Erol Alkan	2021	
"Notorious"	Simon Le Bon; Nick Rhodes; John Taylor	Notorious	Duran Duran; Nile Rodgers	1986	
"Of Crime and Passion"	Simon Le Bon; Nick Rhodes; John Taylor; Andy Taylor; Roger Taylor	Seven and the Ragged Tiger	Alex Sadkin; Ian Little; Duran Duran	1983	
"On Evil Beach"	Simon Le Bon; Nick Rhodes; John Taylor; Roger Taylor	Paper Gods (Target edition)	Duran Duran; Josh Blair	2015	
"One of Those Days"	Simon Le Bon; Nick Rhodes; John Taylor; Andy Taylor; Roger Taylor	Astronaut	Duran Duran; Dallas Austin	2004	
"Only in Dreams"	Simon Le Bon; Nick Rhodes; John Taylor; Roger Taylor; Nile Rodgers; Mark Ronson; Mr Hudson	Paper Gods	Duran Duran; Nile Rodgers; Mark Ronson; Mr Hudson; Josh Blair	2015	
"Ordinary World"	Simon Le Bon; Nick Rhodes; John Taylor; Warren Cuccurullo	Duran Duran (The Wedding Album)	Duran Duran; John Jones	1993	
"Other People's Lives"	Simon Le Bon; Nick Rhodes; John Taylor; Roger Taylor; Mark Ronson; Dominic Brown	All You Need Is Now (physical edition)	Mark Ronson; Duran Duran	2011	
"Out of My Mind"	Simon Le Bon; Nick Rhodes; Warren Cuccurullo	Medazzaland	TV Mania; Syn Pro Tokyo	1997	
"Paint It Black" (The Rolling Stones cover)	Mick Jagger; Keith Richards ‡	Danse Macabre	Duran Duran; Josh Blair	2023	
"Palomino"	Simon Le Bon; Nick Rhodes; John Taylor	Big Thing	Duran Duran; Jonathan Elias; Daniel Abraham	1988	
"Paper Gods" (featuring Mr Hudson)	Simon Le Bon; Nick Rhodes; John Taylor; Roger Taylor; Mr Hudson	Paper Gods	Duran Duran; Mr Hudson	2015	
"Perfect Day" (Lou Reed cover)	Lou Reed ‡	Thank You	Duran Duran; John Jones	1995	
"Planet Earth"	Simon Le Bon; Nick Rhodes; John Taylor; Andy Taylor; Roger Taylor	Duran Duran	Colin Thurston	1981	
"Planet Roaring"	Simon Le Bon; Nick Rhodes; John Taylor; Roger Taylor; Dominic Brown	Paper Gods (deluxe edition)	Duran Duran; Josh Blair	2015	
"Playing with Uranium"	Simon Le Bon; Nick Rhodes; Warren Cuccurullo	Pop Trash	TV Mania; Syn Productions	2000	
"Point of No Return"	Simon Le Bon; Nick Rhodes; John Taylor; Andy Taylor; Roger Taylor	Astronaut	Duran Duran; Nile Rodgers	2004	
"Pop Trash Movie"	Simon Le Bon; Nick Rhodes; Warren Cuccurullo	Pop Trash	TV Mania; Syn Productions	2000	
"Pressure Off" (featuring Janelle Monáe and Nile Rodgers)	Simon Le Bon; Nick Rhodes; John Taylor; Roger Taylor; Nile Rodgers; Mark Ronson; Mr Hudson; Janelle Monáe	Paper Gods	Duran Duran; Nile Rodgers; Mark Ronson; Mr Hudson; Josh Blair	2015	
"Proposition"	Simon Le Bon; Nick Rhodes; John Taylor	Notorious	Duran Duran; Nile Rodgers	1986	
"Prototypes"	Simon Le Bon; Nick Rhodes; Warren Cuccurullo	Pop Trash (Japanese edition)	TV Mania; Syn Productions	2000	
"Psycho Killer" (featuring Victoria De Angelis) (Talking Heads cover)	David Byrne; Chris Frantz; Tina Weymouth ‡	Danse Macabre	Duran Duran; Josh Blair	2023	
"(Reach Up for The) Sunrise"	Simon Le Bon; Nick Rhodes; John Taylor; Andy Taylor; Roger Taylor	Astronaut	Duran Duran; Don Gilmore; Nile Rodgers	2004	
"Read My Lips"	Simon Le Bon; Nick Rhodes; John Taylor; Warren Cuccurullo; Sterling Campbell	Liberty	Chris Kimsey; Duran Duran	1990	
"Red Carpet Massacre"	Simon Le Bon; Nick Rhodes; John Taylor; Roger Taylor; Nate Hills	Red Carpet Massacre	Duran Duran; Nate "Danja" Hills; Jimmy Douglass	2007	
"The Reflex"	Simon Le Bon; Nick Rhodes; John Taylor; Andy Taylor; Roger Taylor	Seven and the Ragged Tiger	Alex Sadkin; Ian Little; Duran Duran	1983	
"Return to Now"	Simon Le Bon; Nick Rhodes; John Taylor; Roger Taylor; Mark Ronson; Dominic Brown	All You Need Is Now (physical edition)	Mark Ronson; Duran Duran	2011	
"Rio"	Simon Le Bon; Nick Rhodes; John Taylor; Andy Taylor; Roger Taylor	Rio	Colin Thurston	1982	
"Runway Runaway"	Simon Le Bon; Nick Rhodes; John Taylor; Roger Taylor; Dominic Brown	All You Need Is Now	Mark Ronson; Duran Duran	2010	
"Safe (In the Heat of the Moment)" (featuring Ana Matronic)"	Simon Le Bon; Nick Rhodes; John Taylor; Roger Taylor; Mark Ronson; Dominic Brown; Ana Matronic	All You Need Is Now	Mark Ronson; Duran Duran	2010	
"Save a Prayer"	Simon Le Bon; Nick Rhodes; John Taylor; Andy Taylor; Roger Taylor	Rio	Colin Thurston	1982	
"Secret Oktober" (Note: A remake titled "Secret Oktober 31st" appears on Danse Macabre (2023).)	Simon Le Bon; Nick Rhodes; John Taylor; Andy Taylor; Roger Taylor	B-side of "Union of the Snake"	Alex Sadkin; Ian Little; Duran Duran	1983	
"Serious"	Simon Le Bon; Nick Rhodes; John Taylor; Warren Cuccurullo; Sterling Campbell	Liberty	Chris Kimsey; Duran Duran	1990	
"The Seventh Stranger"	Simon Le Bon; Nick Rhodes; John Taylor; Andy Taylor; Roger Taylor	Seven and the Ragged Tiger	Alex Sadkin; Ian Little; Duran Duran	1983	
"Shadows on Your Side" (Note: A darker re-recording was released in 2025, with new guitar parts recorded by Andy Taylor. According to Nick Rhodes, the remake was inspired by "the madness and joy of Halloween".)	Simon Le Bon; Nick Rhodes; John Taylor; Andy Taylor; Roger Taylor	Seven and the Ragged Tiger	Alex Sadkin; Ian Little; Duran Duran	1983	
"Shelter"	Simon Le Bon; Nick Rhodes; John Taylor; Warren Cuccurullo	Duran Duran (The Wedding Album)	Duran Duran; John Jones	1993	
"She's Too Much"	Simon Le Bon; Nick Rhodes; John Taylor; Roger Taylor; Nate Hills	Red Carpet Massacre	Duran Duran; Nate "Danja" Hills; Jimmy Douglass	2007	
"Shotgun"	Simon Le Bon; Nick Rhodes; John Taylor; Warren Cuccurullo	Duran Duran (The Wedding Album)	Duran Duran; John Jones	1993	
"Silva Halo"	Simon Le Bon; Nick Rhodes; Warren Cuccurullo	Medazzaland	TV Mania; Syn Pro Tokyo	1997	
"Sin of the City"	Simon Le Bon; Nick Rhodes; John Taylor; Warren Cuccurullo	Duran Duran (The Wedding Album)	Duran Duran; John Jones	1993	
"Sinner or Saint"	Simon Le Bon; Nick Rhodes; Warren Cuccurullo	B-side of "Out of My Mind"	TV Mania; Syn Pro Tokyo	1997	
"Skin Divers"	Simon Le Bon; Nick Rhodes; John Taylor; Roger Taylor; Nate Hills; Tim Mosley	Red Carpet Massacre	Duran Duran; Nate "Danja" Hills; Timbaland	2007	
"Skin Trade"	Simon Le Bon; Nick Rhodes; John Taylor	Notorious	Duran Duran; Nile Rodgers	1986	
"So Long Suicide"	Simon Le Bon; Nick Rhodes; Warren Cuccurullo	Medazzaland	TV Mania; Syn Pro Tokyo	1997	
"So Misled"	Simon Le Bon; Nick Rhodes; John Taylor	Notorious	Duran Duran; Nile Rodgers	1986	
"Someone Else Not Me" (Note: Spanish and French versions, titled "Alguien Que No Soy Yo" and "Un Autre Que Moi", respectively, appear as bonus tracks on the Japanese edition.)	Simon Le Bon; Nick Rhodes; Warren Cuccurullo	Pop Trash	TV Mania; Syn Productions	2000	
"Sound of Thunder"	Simon Le Bon; Nick Rhodes; John Taylor; Andy Taylor; Roger Taylor	Duran Duran	Colin Thurston	1981	
"Spellbound" (Siouxsie and the Banshees cover)	Susan Ballion; Peter Edward Clarke; John McGeoch; Steven Severin ‡	Danse Macabre	Duran Duran; Josh Blair	2023	
"Starting to Remember"	Simon Le Bon; Nick Rhodes; Warren Cuccurullo	Pop Trash	TV Mania; Syn Productions	2000	
"Still Breathing"	Simon Le Bon; Nick Rhodes; John Taylor; Andy Taylor; Roger Taylor	Astronaut	Duran Duran; Don Gilmore; Mark Tinley	2004	
"Stop Dead"	Simon Le Bon; Nick Rhodes; John Taylor; Warren Cuccurullo	Duran Duran (The Wedding Album) (UK limited edition)	Duran Duran; John Jones	1994	
"Success" (Iggy Pop cover)	David Bowie; Ricky Gardiner ‡	Thank You	Duran Duran; John Jones	1995	
"The Sun Doesn't Shine Forever"	Simon Le Bon; Nick Rhodes; Warren Cuccurullo	Pop Trash	TV Mania; Syn Productions	2000	
"Sunset Garage"	Simon Le Bon; Nick Rhodes; John Taylor; Roger Taylor; Mr Hudson	Paper Gods	Duran Duran; Josh Blair; Mr Hudson	2015	
"Super Lonely Freak" (Note: A mashup of Rick James's "Super Freak" and Duran Duran's "Lonely In Your Nightmare")	Simon Le Bon; Nick Rhodes; John Taylor; Roger Taylor; Rick James; Alonzo Miller	Danse Macabre	Duran Duran; Josh Blair	2023	
"Supernature" (Cerrone cover)	Marc Cerrone; Alain Wisniak; Lili Marlen Premilovich ‡	Danse Macabre	Duran Duran; Josh Blair	2023	
"Taste the Summer"	Simon Le Bon; Nick Rhodes; John Taylor; Andy Taylor; Roger Taylor	Astronaut	Duran Duran; Don Gilmore	2004	
"Tel Aviv"	Simon Le Bon; Nick Rhodes; John Taylor; Andy Taylor; Roger Taylor	Duran Duran	Colin Thurston	1981	
"Tempted"	Simon Le Bon; Nick Rhodes; John Taylor; Roger Taylor; Nate Hills	Red Carpet Massacre	Duran Duran; Nate "Danja" Hills; Jimmy Douglass	2007	
"Thank You" (Led Zeppelin cover)	Jimmy Page; Robert Plant ‡	Thank You	Duran Duran; John Jones	1995	
"This Lost Weekend"	Simon Le Bon; Nick Rhodes; John Taylor; Roger Taylor; Dominic Brown	All You Need Is Now (Japanese edition)	Mark Ronson; Duran Duran	2011	
"Throb"	Simon Le Bon; Nick Rhodes; John Taylor; Warren Cuccurullo; Sterling Campbell	B-side of "Violence of Summer (Love's Taking Over)"	Chris Kimsey; Duran Duran	1990	
"Tiger Tiger"	Simon Le Bon; Nick Rhodes; John Taylor; Andy Taylor; Roger Taylor	Seven and the Ragged Tiger	Alex Sadkin; Ian Little; Duran Duran	1983	
"Time for Temptation"	Simon Le Bon; Nick Rhodes; John Taylor; Warren Cuccurullo	Duran Duran (The Wedding Album) (UK limited edition)	Duran Duran; John Jones	1994	
"To the Shore"	Simon Le Bon; Nick Rhodes; John Taylor; Andy Taylor; Roger Taylor	Duran Duran	Colin Thurston	1981	
"To Whom It May Concern"	Simon Le Bon; Nick Rhodes; John Taylor; Warren Cuccurullo	Duran Duran (The Wedding Album)	Duran Duran; John Jones	1993	
"Tonight United"	Simon Le Bon; Nick Rhodes; John Taylor; Roger Taylor; Giorgio Moroder	Future Past	Duran Duran; Giorgio Moroder; Josh Blair	2021	
"Too Bad You're So Beautiful"	Simon Le Bon; Nick Rhodes; John Taylor; Roger Taylor; Dominic Brown; Nick Hodgson	All You Need Is Now (physical edition)	Mark Ronson; Duran Duran	2011	
"Too Close to the Sun"	Simon Le Bon; Nick Rhodes; John Taylor; Roger Taylor; Dominic Brown	All You Need Is Now (Best Buy edition)	Mark Ronson; Duran Duran	2011	
"Too Late Marlene"	Simon Le Bon; Nick Rhodes; John Taylor	Big Thing	Duran Duran; Jonathan Elias; Daniel Abraham	1988	
"Too Much Information"	Simon Le Bon; Nick Rhodes; John Taylor; Warren Cuccurullo	Duran Duran (The Wedding Album)	Duran Duran; John Jones	1993	
"Tricked Out"	Simon Le Bon; Nick Rhodes; John Taylor; Roger Taylor; Nate Hills	Red Carpet Massacre	Duran Duran; Nate "Danja" Hills; Jimmy Douglass	2007	
"UMF"	Simon Le Bon; Nick Rhodes; John Taylor; Warren Cuccurullo	Duran Duran (The Wedding Album)	Duran Duran; John Jones	1993	
"Undergoing Treatment"	Simon Le Bon; Nick Rhodes; Warren Cuccurullo	Medazzaland	TV Mania; Syn Pro Tokyo; Anthony J. Resta; Bob St. John	1997	
"Union of the Snake"	Simon Le Bon; Nick Rhodes; John Taylor; Andy Taylor; Roger Taylor	Seven and the Ragged Tiger	Alex Sadkin; Ian Little; Duran Duran	1983	
"The Universe Alone"	Simon Le Bon; Nick Rhodes; John Taylor; Roger Taylor	Paper Gods	Duran Duran; Josh Blair	2015	
"Valentine Stones"	Simon Le Bon; Nick Rhodes; John Taylor; Roger Taylor	Paper Gods (deluxe edition)	Duran Duran; Josh Blair	2015	
"The Valley"	Simon Le Bon; Nick Rhodes; John Taylor; Roger Taylor; Nate Hills	Red Carpet Massacre	Duran Duran; Nate "Danja" Hills; Jimmy Douglass	2007	
"Velvet Newton"	Simon Le Bon; Nick Rhodes; John Taylor; Roger Taylor; Graham Coxon	Future Past (deluxe edition)	Duran Duran; Erol Alkan	2021	
"Venice Drowning"	Simon Le Bon; Nick Rhodes; John Taylor; Warren Cuccurullo; Sterling Campbell	Liberty	Chris Kimsey; Duran Duran	1990	
"Vertigo (Do the Demolition)"	Simon Le Bon; Nick Rhodes; John Taylor	Notorious	Duran Duran; Nile Rodgers	1986	
"A View to a Kill"	Simon Le Bon; Nick Rhodes; John Taylor; Andy Taylor; Roger Taylor; John Barry	A View to a Kill (Original Motion Picture Soundtrack)	Bernard Edwards; Jason Corsaro; Duran Duran	1985	
"Violence of Summer (Love's Taking Over)"	Simon Le Bon; Nick Rhodes; John Taylor; Warren Cuccurullo; Sterling Campbell	Liberty	Chris Kimsey; Duran Duran	1990	
"Virus"	Simon Le Bon; Nick Rhodes; John Taylor; Andy Taylor; Roger Taylor	Astronaut (Japanese edition)	Duran Duran	2004	
"Watching the Detectives" (Elvis Costello cover)	Elvis Costello ‡	Thank You	Duran Duran; John Jones	1995	
"Want You More!"	Simon Le Bon; Nick Rhodes; John Taylor; Andy Taylor; Roger Taylor	Astronaut	Duran Duran; Don Gilmore; Dallas Austin	2004	
"We Need You"	Simon Le Bon; Nick Rhodes; John Taylor	B-side of "Skin Trade"	Duran Duran; Nile Rodgers	1986	
"What Are the Chances?"	Simon Le Bon; Nick Rhodes; John Taylor; Roger Taylor; Dominic Brown; Mr Hudson	Paper Gods	Duran Duran; Josh Blair; Mr Hudson	2015	
"What Happens Tomorrow"	Simon Le Bon; Nick Rhodes; John Taylor; Andy Taylor; Roger Taylor	Astronaut	Duran Duran; Don Gilmore	2004	
"White Lines" (Melle Mel cover)	Melvin Glover; Sylvia Robinson ‡	Thank You	Duran Duran; John Jones	1995	
"Who Do You Think You Are?"	Simon Le Bon; Nick Rhodes; Warren Cuccurullo	Medazzaland	TV Mania; Syn Pro Tokyo	1997	
"The Wild Boys"	Simon Le Bon; Nick Rhodes; John Taylor; Andy Taylor; Roger Taylor	Arena	Nile Rodgers	1984	
"Wing"	Simon Le Bon; Nick Rhodes; John Taylor; Roger Taylor; Graham Coxon; Mark Ronson	Future Past	Duran Duran; Josh Blair	2021	
"Winter Marches On"	Simon Le Bon; Nick Rhodes; John Taylor	Notorious	Duran Duran; Nile Rodgers	1986	
"Yo Bad Azizi"	Simon Le Bon; Nick Rhodes; John Taylor; Warren Cuccurullo; Sterling Campbell	B-side of "Serious"	Chris Kimsey; Duran Duran	1990	
"You Kill Me with Silence"	Simon Le Bon; Nick Rhodes; John Taylor; Roger Taylor; Mr Hudson	Paper Gods	Duran Duran; Mr Hudson	2015	
"Zoom In"	Simon Le Bon; Nick Rhodes; John Taylor; Roger Taylor; Nate Hills; Tim Mosley	Red Carpet Massacre	Duran Duran; Nate "Danja" Hills; Timbaland	2007	
