= Reportage (album) =

Studio album by Duran Duran
- Released: Unreleased
- Recorded: September 2005 – April 2006 in San Francisco and London
- Label: Epic
- Producer: Michael Patterson

Reportage is the working title of an unfinished album that English pop band Duran Duran wrote and recorded as the intended follow-up to their 2004 reunion album Astronaut. After the departure of original guitarist Andy Taylor in 2006, the band decided to start anew with a new batch of songs that became 2007's Red Carpet Massacre.

== The making of Reportage ==
In Andy Taylor's 2008 autobiography, Wild Boy: My Life in Duran Duran, he revealed that the band had originally been offered the opportunity to record their next album "aboard a [$450 million] superyacht owned by Paul Allen... but sadly the plan fell through at the last minute due to the boat becoming unavailable." Instead they began with three weeks of self-produced recording sessions at Andre Agassi's Tiburon mansion in September 2005. They moved the recording sessions to London in October, where they continued working on the album until April 2006 with Michael Patterson as engineer and co-producer. In March, drummer Roger Taylor commented that "the record will be in some ways a homage to our roots as a band, more direct and a return to our dance and new wave origins."

Bassist John Taylor discussed the circumstances behind Reportage during a 2007 XM Radio Artist Confidential Session: "We'd been on the road with the reunion tour for a couple of years and we were feeling pretty confident. We felt that we'd found ourselves again as musicians, so we were quite excited to come off the road and start writing and recording straight away. Our confidence was such [that] we felt we didn't need a producer, we could make all the decisions ourselves, so we wrote songs quite quickly and really felt that we had an album." According to Andy, John was taking charge of the sessions: "We did some more recording in February 2006, and this time John seemed more determined than ever to take on the role of producer."

Following sessions at London's Sphere Studios, they submitted a rough mix of the album to their record label Sony Music in May 2006, but it was rejected for not having an obvious lead single. According to John, "I guess we'd worked on it for about six months, we got a title Reportage and we kind of had a cover and we presented it to the label. They said they heard the second single and the third single but not the first single, so they suggested could we perhaps go and cut a couple of songs with a producer—maybe something a little bit more commercial." According to Andy, the band met with producer Youth in June and discussed working with him at his studio in Spain that autumn to "work out which bits were the most important and how to make all the various components work together as a whole." They also made plans to record a few potential singles with Timbaland in October. The band and Timbaland had previously met and expressed their desire to work together.

== Timbaland sessions and second split with Andy Taylor ==
The Timbaland sessions were advanced to September to allow for the participation of Justin Timberlake. They both joined the band along with Nate "Danja" Hills at Manhattan Center Studios in New York City for writing and recording sessions, but Andy didn't appear. After a month of fan speculation, on 26 October 2006, Duran Duran announced that "As of last weekend, the four of us have dissolved our partnership and will be continuing as Duran Duran without Andy, as we have reached a point in our relationship with him where there is an unworkable gulf between us and we can no longer effectively function together. Although obviously disappointed and saddened about this, we are excited about the next chapter of the Duran Duran story and look forward to seeing you all soon.".

One week later, before a concert in Providence, John went on to suggest that the split had been coming for some time: "We've not really been on the same page for a while. And it's been getting very testy most of this year, actually. And there's just been a break coming. We've had different aims, different considerations, different loyalties. (...) And life goes on. Four out of the five of us have rediscovered each other, and realized that we're the best friends we've ever had. And we're enormously grateful to have each other in our lives. And there's nobody I'd rather make music with, and I can say the same for the other three. I don't think I could say that for Andy."

Andy later wrote in his autobiography that there had been "pressure building up" between the band members, a "lack of clear direction" during the sessions, and that the music had been prematurely submitted to Sony in his opinion: "the album needed more work" he wrote, although he had "played enough guitar parts for about three albums". Andy attributed the cause of his departure to a combination of "constant arguments within the band", clinical depression brought on by his father's recent death, and "administrative failures by the band's management" in neglecting to renew his US work visa, leaving him feeling "as if I'd been trapped on a derailed runaway train."

The band initially planned to incorporate the new Timbaland-produced songs into Reportage. A December 2006 Billboard article claimed that "the as-yet-untitled follow-up to 2004's Astronaut would also feature the reggae-tinged '48 Hours Later' and 'Transcendental Mental,' which [Nick] Rhodes says takes aim at 'new-age frauds. It's one of the funniest lyrics Simon has written in many years.'... Asked if the disparate sounds of [the Timbaland tracks] compared to the album's more guitar-driven songs may be jarring to the listener, Rhodes says, 'With [those cuts], you can tell there was another hand in them for sure. Although they are a slight change of direction in that some of the others are a bit more guitar-heavy or indie-sounding, Simon is the glue that holds them all together.'"

== Red Carpet Massacre ==
After parting ways with their guitarist the band soon decided to abandon all of the Reportage songs, cancel the Youth sessions, and further explore their new musical direction with Dom Brown on guitar and Danja producing and co-writing. John was quoted as saying, "we were kind of coming to the decision that we were going to let go of all of this music, and we were going to let go of songs that we had been working on for months and months. But there was such a thing that we were moving forward, that we were creating this new identity." As Rhodes commented later, "Our sound exploded with pop culture's brightest flowers (...) The vision became clear".

Duran Duran wrote and recorded three songs with Timbaland, and they became the starting core of an entirely new album titled Red Carpet Massacre. Completed with the help of Hills, Jimmy Douglass and Timberlake, and anticipated by the "Falling Down" single, Red Carpet Massacre was released on 19 November 2007 to mixed reviews and disappointing sales (it peaked at #44 on the UK album chart compared to the #3 peak position of Astronaut). As a result, the band broke ties with Epic Records and its parent company Sony.

In a 2011 interview for the release of their album All You Need Is Now, Rhodes and John commented on the Reportage / Red Carpet Massacre days. According to John, "That whole project was a fucking nightmare. We delivered an album to Sony that was a natural-sounding, almost rock album, and they were like 'We need something a bit pop, do you fancy doing a couple of tracks with Timbaland?' And around the same time we fell out with Andy, so the Timbaland stuff sounded hugely different from what we'd done before." Rhodes expanded: "The thing was, we got an opportunity to work with Timbaland, so we thought 'Great, let's go for it.' We knew it was a risk in terms of what the fans would like, if you're working with someone who is ostensibly an electro/hip hop producer. When Timbaland saw the guitar and the bass and the drums come in to the studio, I think he was mortified, because everything's in a box for those guys. But I'm really glad we made that album, because in time I think it will stand up."

== Songs recorded for Reportage ==
Keyboardist Nick Rhodes described the album's edgy sound in an interview with Details magazine: "It was a very angry record for Duran Duran, quite political. We've always reflected what's around us; it's just that we always tried to pick the more uplifting subjects. But there was so much doom and gloom and horror that it had got pretty deep under our skin. There's one track on there called 'Criminals in the Capital', about our dueling leaders on both sides of the Atlantic... there was one song about a fighter pilot in the [Iraq] war. There's another song, one of my favourites on the record, actually, about the decay of the world and how we're all ignoring it—a song of desperation."

Singer Simon Le Bon said of the album in 2011: "I would be failing in my duty if I didn't get at least the song '48 Hours Later', which is sublime. It's one of the best Duran Duran songs I've ever heard. And it would work well with what we're doing now. You could easily have it on All You Need Is Now. There's another one called 'Transcendental Mental' which sounds great. There's another called 'Traumatized' which lyrically isn't as strong, but the melody is great." He also mentioned a song with the working title of 'Nobody' in a September 2005 interview on YouTube: "We wanted to recapture the rawness and energy of our first album and I think we've got it with songs like 'Traumatized' and 'Nobody', which are working titles obviously."

John commented on a song called "Under the Wire" in April 2006:

We have been working on around fifteen songs over the last couple of months... We're mixing today, a song for the new album. It's a noisy one, quite aggressive in places, and Mike Patterson our engineer/co-producer is working several knobs at once so that Simon sounds just the right mixture of nasty and cool. It's new territory for us, this song. It's about alienation...or is it? I have to be careful making assumptions about Simon's lyrics. The chorus line, 'We go under the wire, we go in under fire.' But this war zone is domestic, a council estate.

He also mentioned the songs "Angel Fire" and "Criminals in the Capitol" during the band's 2007 XM Radio session: "we were writing songs about the stuff that was on the television, the stuff that was in the newspapers—there was a song called 'Criminals in the Capitol', there was a song called 'Angel Fire'."

Information on another song was provided by the Duranasty news site: "There is one song of Reportage called 'Judy, Where Are You'. Nick told me that the song is about their friend in New Orleans who went missing after Hurricane Katrina. Nick said it's a beautiful song and has got [a] Kinks influence." Additionally, the song titles 'Naomi Tonight' and 'You Ain't Foolin' No One' were revealed by music industry insiders on the Velvet Rope message board. Both song titles have also been registered by the band with ASCAP.

These are the working song titles that have been identified by band members and music industry sources as being part of the Reportage project before it was abandoned:

- "Criminals in the Capitol"
- "48 Hours Later"
- "Transcendental Mental"
- "Traumatized"
- "Angel Fire"
- "Under the Wire"
- "Judy, Where Are You?"
- "Naomi Tonight"
- "You Ain't Foolin' No One"

All of the above song titles are registered with ASCAP. "Criminals in the Capital" was registered as "Criminals in the Capitol", "Traumatized" was registered with the American spelling and "Judy, Where Are You?" was registered as "Judy". The song mentioned by Le Bon as having the working title "Nobody" is likely the same song that was registered with ASCAP as "You Ain't Foolin' No One".

Additional working song titles have also been confirmed with ASCAP's ACE Title Search engine:

- "Cathedral"
- "Faster"
- "Finally"
- "Lions and Wolves"
- "Midnight City"
- "Under Snow"

The title "City" was also registered prior to "Midnight City". All of these song titles can be confirmed as originating from the Reportage sessions based on their ASCAP songwriting credits and assigned Work ID number sequences.

== The future of Reportage ==
Although John Taylor called it "our misunderstood masterpiece", Reportage has not been released, and none of its songs have been performed live. No recordings are known to have leaked, aside from a few brief studio session clips that were posted online.

The members of Duran Duran have discussed eventual plans for Reportage. According to Rhodes, the group hopes to release it someday: "We want it to come out one day, it's a really interesting record... more of an edgy, indie rock album, obviously going back to our earlier roots. There are a lot of songs I'm very proud of that I'd like people to hear."

As part of their deal with new record label BMG, Duran Duran hope to release Reportage. Rhodes told Classic Pop magazine in 2021: "It's in pretty decent shape overall, we'd need three weeks to finish it... I'd no objection if Andy [Taylor] wanted to do some tweaks."

Further, in a YouTube live stream interview entitled 'Duran Duran's Premium Afterparty' with Rhodes on 29 November 2023, as part of the music video premiere for the Danse Macabre track "Black Moonlight", Rhodes reiterated—upon a recent review of the album and the return of all of the band's members—that Reportage could be their next project.

Simon Le Bon recently mentioned in a BBC radio show that he guest presented the band's plans in 2025 which involved a European Tour and continuing work on the album.
