= Red Carpet Massacre =

2007 studio album by Duran Duran

Studio album by Duran Duran
- Released: 13 November 2007
- Recorded: 2006–2007
- Studios: Sphere (London); Manhattan Center (New York City); Sarm (London); Metropolis (London); Oz (Valencia, California)
- Length: 48:52
- Label: Epic
- Producers: Jim Beanz; Jimmy Douglass; Duran Duran; Nate "Danja" Hills; Timbaland; Justin Timberlake

Duran Duran chronology
Astronaut (2004)	Red Carpet Massacre (2007)	Live at Hammersmith '82! (2009)

Singles from Red Carpet Massacre
- 1. "Falling Down" Released: 5 November 2007

Red Carpet Massacre is the twelfth studio album by the English pop rock band Duran Duran, released on 13 November 2007 by Epic Records. Most of the music on the final incarnation of the album was completed in late 2006 following the departure of band member Andy Taylor with new guitarist Dominic Brown replacing him, when record producer Timbaland began working with the band. However, Brown is not considered an official member, so Duran Duran is featured as a quartet. "Falling Down" was the only single released from the album.

Red Carpet Massacre debuted at number 44 on the UK Albums Chart, becoming the band's second lowest-debuting album on the chart, after Pop Trash (2000). The album debuted at number 36 on the US Billboard 200, selling 29,000 copies in its first week. The following week, it fell to number 116. As of February 2011, the album had sold 102,000 copies in the United States.

It was Duran Duran's second and final album released under Epic Records, before the band parted ways with the label in 2009. It was reissued by BMG in 2022, after the band's signing with the label.

== Early sessions ==
The band did its initial recording for its follow-up to Astronaut with producer Michael Patterson between September 2005 and April 2006. Roger Taylor said in March 2006, "The record will be in some ways a homage to our roots as a band, more direct and a return to our dance and 'new wave' origins", adding that they had brought 15 tracks to near completion.

The record was provisionally titled Reportage and expected to be released in late May 2006 with a summer tour to follow, but as reported by Billboard, the album was delayed as guitarist Andy Taylor had a falling-out with the rest of the band for unknown reasons, and the material was eventually shelved altogether in favour of recording Red Carpet Massacre.

In early October 2006, vocalist Simon Le Bon announced that the band had recorded three songs with Timbaland, his protégé Nate 'Danja' Hills and engineer Jimmy Douglass at Manhattan Center Studios during September. Billboard reported that one of those tracks was "Nite-Runner", featuring Justin Timberlake, which at the time was expected to be the first single from the album. Two additional songs on which the band worked with Timbaland were titled "Skin Divers" and "Zooming In". Also mentioned were two other tracks, "48 Hours Later" and "Transcendental Mental", which were not used on the album.

== Andy Taylor's departure ==
Andy Taylor did not perform at any of Duran Duran's October shows and had not participated during the New York sessions with Timbaland, and on 25 October 2006, a message posted on the band's site announced: "As of last weekend [...] the four of us have dissolved our partnership and will be continuing as Duran Duran without Andy, as we have reached a point in our relationship with him where there is an unworkable gulf between us and we can no longer effectively function together."

Dominic Brown, who had taken Taylor's place at several previous missed concerts in the past, was hired as Duran Duran's guitarist, taking part in the recording sessions. Brown has since performed with the band as their full-time touring guitarist, but he has never been introduced as an official member.

Taylor told Rolling Stone magazine that he was in favour of a more electric sound, whereas Le Bon wanted to go in a different direction involving people such as Justin Timberlake and Timbaland. In addition, Taylor wrote in his autobiography that in the renewed bickering between himself, Nick Rhodes and Le Bon grew worse, and it was not helped by Taylor's emotional state following the death of his father, later diagnosed as clinical depression.

According to Taylor's autobiography, the final straw came when he discovered that the band's management had not been able to secure a working visa for him to record in the United States. The other band members maintained that they fully expected him to show up for the recording session with Timbaland, but that he became incommunicado and was unreachable by phone or email, leaving them no choice but to continue on without him.

== Remaking the album ==
The band decided to rewrite the whole album following Taylor's departure. 14 songs had been completed for Reportage, but according to Le Bon: "When we sat down and listened to what we had done on our own, we didn't feel we had a lead track, so we got in touch with Timbaland, who was the only producer out there that we knew we all liked."

Following the New York sessions in September, Duran Duran moved to Metropolis Studios in London with Danja and Douglass for the next sessions.

In June 2007, Duran Duran announced on their official website that they were recording yet another track with Timberlake, titled "Falling Down". However, it was "Nite-Runner" that the band decided to debut live at the much-anticipated fan-club only Hammerstein Ballroom concert in New York City on 17 June, and Le Bon was still touting it as the probable first single in a post to the band's official website. Several other album tracks ("The Valley", "Red Carpet Massacre", "Skin Divers" and "Box Full O' Honey") were played over the sound system at the concert, but were not performed live.

Following the New York concert and a listening party for the media at which the album title was announced, band members Le Bon, Rhodes, John Taylor and Roger Taylor went back to England to work on some mixes for the album and perform at the Concert for Diana and Live Earth concerts in London. They completed one more recording session in New York and then returned to London to put the finishing touches on the album before its release.

Duran Duran bassist John Taylor criticised Sony Music for turning the work on Red Carpet Massacre into a "nightmare". According to him, the record label wanted to make their record "a bit pop" and forced them to collaborate with Timbaland, which turned out to be an unpleasant experience for the band. "We delivered an album to Sony that was a natural-sounding, almost rock album, and they were like: 'We need something a bit pop, do you fancy doing a couple of tracks with Timbaland?'", he claimed. Nick Rhodes added: "The thing was, we got an opportunity to work with Timbaland, so we thought, 'Great, let's go for it'. When Timbaland saw the guitar and the bass and the drums come in to the studio, I think he was mortified, because everything's in a box for those guys."

== Release and reception ==
Professional ratings
Aggregate scores
Source	Rating
Metacritic	61/100
Review scores
Source	Rating
AllMusic	3.5/5 stars
Entertainment Weekly	B+
NME	4/10
Pitchfork	3.8/10
PopMatters	6/10
Q	3/5 stars
Rolling Stone	3/5 stars
Spin	3/5 stars
Sputnikmusic	2.5/5
Uncut	3/5 stars

Red Carpet Massacre was met with generally favorable reviews from music critics. At Metacritic, which assigns a normalized rating out of 100 to reviews from mainstream publications, the album received an average score of 61, based on 20 reviews. It was briefly released on vinyl. In 2021, the band signed a deal for the album with BMG (along with Medazzaland, Pop Trash and Astronaut) which saw it being re-issued in the UK on various digital platforms, with a planned vinyl re-issue due to be released at a later date.

== Track listing ==
All lyrics are written by Simon Le Bon; all music is composed by Duran Duran and Nate Hills, except where noted. All tracks produced by Nate "Danja" Hills, Jimmy Douglass and Duran Duran, except where noted.

No.	Title	Music	Producer(s)	Length
1.	"The Valley"			4:58
2.	"Red Carpet Massacre"			3:17
3.	"Nite-Runner" (additional lyrics: Tim Mosley, Justin Timberlake)	Duran Duran; Mosley; Timberlake; Hills	Timbaland; Timberlake; Hills; Duran Duran	3:58
4.	"Falling Down"	Duran Duran; Timberlake	Timberlake	5:41
5.	"Box Full O' Honey"			3:10
6.	"Skin Divers" (additional lyrics: Mosley)	Duran Duran; Mosley; Hills	Timbaland; Hills; Duran Duran	4:24
7.	"Tempted"			4:24
8.	"Tricked Out"			2:46
9.	"Zoom In"	Duran Duran; Mosley; Hills	Timbaland; Hills; Duran Duran	3:27
10.	"She's Too Much"			5:14
11.	"Dirty Great Monster"			3:36
12.	"Last Man Standing"			4:00

Japanese edition and iTunes Store bonus track
No.	Title	Length
13.	"Cry Baby Cry"	3:55

iTunes Store bonus tracks (select countries)
No.	Title	Length
13.	"Cry Baby Cry"	3:55
14.	"Nite-Runner" (live)	4:02
15.	"Red Carpet Massacre" (live)	3:09

Limited edition US vinyl
No.	Title	Length
11.	"Cry Baby Cry"	3:56
12.	"Dirty Great Monster"	3:36
13.	"Last Man Standing"	4:00

Deluxe edition bonus DVD
No.	Title	Length
1.	"The Album"	10:56
2.	"The Artwork"	6:35
3.	"The Video"	11:50
4.	"The Campaign"	3:53
5.	"The Out-Takes"	6:57
6.	"The Stills"

== Personnel ==
Credits adapted from the liner notes of Red Carpet Massacre.

=== Duran Duran ===
- Simon Le Bon
- Nick Rhodes
- John Taylor
- Roger Taylor

=== Additional musicians ===
- Dom Brown – guitar
- Timbaland – additional vocals (tracks 3, 6)
- Justin Timberlake – additional vocals (tracks 3, 4)
- Jim Beanz – additional vocals (tracks 3, 10)
- Terri Walker – additional vocals (track 6)
- Simon Willescroft – saxophone (track 11)
- Marcella "Ms Lago" Araica – additional programming (track 1)

=== Technical ===
- Nate "Danja" Hills – production (tracks 1–3, 5–12)
- Jimmy Douglass – production (tracks 1, 2, 5, 7, 8, 10–12); mixing (tracks 1, 2, 6–10, 12); engineering (tracks 1–3, 5–12)
- Duran Duran – production (tracks 1–3, 5–12)
- Timbaland – production (tracks 3, 6, 9)
- Justin Timberlake – production (tracks 3, 4)
- Jean-Marie Horvat – mixing (tracks 3–5, 11); engineering (track 4)
- Colin Miller – mix prep (tracks 3–5, 11)
- Marcella "Ms Lago" Araica – engineering (tracks 1, 2, 5, 7, 8, 10–12)
- Matt Lawrence – engineering (track 4); additional engineering (tracks 1, 10, 12)
- Matthew Hager – engineering (track 4); mixing (on "Cry Baby Cry")
- Ethan Willoughby – additional engineering (track 3)
- Jim Beanz – vocal production (tracks 5, 9–12)
- Joshua Blair – studio assistance at Sphere Studios (London)
- Karen Leite – studio assistance at Sphere Studios (London)
- Zach McNees – studio assistance at Manhattan Center Studios (New York City)
- Darren Moore – studio assistance at Manhattan Center Studios (New York City)
- Graham Archer – studio assistance at Sarm Studios (London)
- Neil Tucker – studio assistance at Metropolis Studios (London)
- Rohan Onraet – studio assistance at Metropolis Studios (London)
- Jammeel Davis Jones – studio assistance at Oz Recording Studios (Valencia, California)
- Vlado Meller – mastering at Universal Mastering Studios (New York City)
- Mark Santangelo – mastering assistance

=== Artwork ===
- Patty Palazzo – art, design
- John Taylor – art direction
- Nick Rhodes – cover and inside photography
- Kristin Burns – band and paparazzo photography

== Charts ==
Chart performance for Red Carpet Massacre
Chart (2007)	Peak position
Australian Albums (ARIA)	69
Czech Albums (ČNS IFPI)	47
Dutch Albums (Album Top 100)	73
French Albums (SNEP)	145
German Albums (Offizielle Top 100)	85
Irish Albums (IRMA)	75
Italian Albums (FIMI)	10
Japanese Albums (Oricon)	73
Scottish Albums (Official Charts)	47
Swiss Albums (Schweizer Hitparade)	39
UK Albums (Official Charts)	44
US Billboard 200	36
US Top Alternative Albums (Billboard)	5
US Top Rock Albums (Billboard)	8

== Release history ==
Release history for Red Carpet Massacre
Region	Date
United States	13 November 2007
Europe	19 November 2007
