= Mark Tinley =

- Birth name: Mark Simon Tinley
- Also known as: Mark Ty-Wharton
- Born: 18 March 1963 (age 62) Southampton, Hampshire, England
- Genres: Acid house, punk, alternative rock, glitch, experimental
- Occupations: Music technologist, guitarist, public speaker
- Instruments: Vocals, guitar, keyboards
- Years active: 1979–present
- Labels: Delektra, KAK Records, Pepper, Peacefrog, SOHO Girl Records, Underground Level Recordings

Mark Ty-Wharton (born Mark Tinley; 18 March 1963) is a British music technologist, informal logician and public speaker who specialises in presentations using sound art. He is best known for his work as a guitarist, programmer, sound engineer and record producer with Adamski, Duran Duran, TV Mania, Gary Numan, Glenn Gregory, the Dandy Warhols and others.

== Bands ==
In 1982, he formed the band Peeping Toms with Shaun Morris, and left several months later when they found a bass player; the band has continued to play, in various configurations, for over two decades. He was inspired by industrial band SPK to begin working on solo projects involving the layering of sounds on a high-end tape recorder, while playing in numerous other bands on the side. He played a John Peel session in 1984 as part of the band Dormannu, continued forming and reforming bands, worked in and founded various nightclubs, and acquired numerous synthesizers and other acoustic toys along the way.

In 1988, he formed Britain's first acid house band the Garden of Eden with Kiss FM DJ Steve Jackson, vocalist Angela McCluskey and fashion designer Pam Hogg. The recording charted at number 93 on 24 December.

He then formed Diskord Datkord with his brother Adam Tinley (better known as Adamski) and Jonny Slut of Specimen which signed with SOHO Records and released one single. Tinley then worked for Adamski, first as a programmer, then as a sound engineer while touring Europe and the United States to promote the single "Killer".

== Duran Duran ==
In 1993, Tinley was introduced to Duran Duran by Rob Ferguson, hired as a keyboard programmer, and soon became an integral part of their songwriting and production team, working intimately with keyboardist Nick Rhodes. "[Rhodes will] say 'I like this sound, but can you make it like this?' So when we first started he went through all the sounds on all the keyboards and decided what sounds worked for various songs, then asked me to modify those that weren't quite right. And sometimes he'll just describe a sound and I'll sit down and make it for him." Their workhorse keyboard is the Kurzweil K2000, along with numerous other technological gadgets.

Tinley helped to set up the home studio which came to be known as "Privacy" in the living room of guitarist Warren Cuccurullo which is where the band recorded their 1993 Wedding Album. He also toured with the band, helping to prepare and maintain the complex synthesizer set-ups used by Rhodes during live shows.

Tinley continued working on Duran Duran's subsequent albums Thank You (1995), Medazzaland (1997), Pop Trash (2000), and Astronaut (2004). He also produced the Dandy Warhols with Rhodes, and created the TV Mania project with Rhodes and Cuccurullo.

== Private life ==
In 2016, after taking a ten-year career break to come to terms with his diagnosis of autism, Tinley opened a music shop in Glastonbury, UK.
