= Falling Down (Duran Duran song) =

Single by Duran Duran featuring Justin Timberlake

from the album Red Carpet Massacre
- B-side: "(Reach Up for The) Sunrise" (live)
- Released: 12 November 2007 (UK)
- Recorded: 2007
- Genre: Pop rock; R&B
- Length: 5:42 (album version); 3:40 (radio edit)
- Label: Epic
- Songwriters: Justin Timberlake; Simon Le Bon; John Taylor; Dominic Brown; Roger Taylor; Andy Taylor; Nick Rhodes
- Producer: Justin Timberlake

Duran Duran singles chronology
"Nice" (2005)	"Falling Down" (2007)	"All You Need Is Now" (2010)

Music video
- "Falling Down" on YouTube

"Falling Down" is a song by the English pop rock band Duran Duran from their 2007 album Red Carpet Massacre, which was sent to radio and made available to download from iTunes USA on 25 September 2007. It was recorded in two sessions in Blueprint Studios, Manchester and Sarm Studios, London. It is the only song on the album produced solely by Justin Timberlake and the band. All other songs are produced by Danja and Timbaland.

According to the band's official website, the single wasn't released on CD in the USA, due to the decline of physical singles being released in the US over passing time. However, the single was still released on CD in several European countries on 12 November 2017 and an 8-track promo CD was also released featuring remixes by artists such as Sebastian Leger and T-empo.

The single was the band's last to be released on Epic Records.

== Background ==
In an interview in October 2007, main songwriter and keyboardist Nick Rhodes called "Falling Down" a satirical, social, pop-cultural commentary. Asked if Kate Moss served as inspiration, Rhodes added: "She doesn't appear in the video, but she and Lindsay and Britney and Amy have all provided us with inspiration." Drummer Roger Taylor confirmed that the song was loosely based on Spears: "I suppose it's loosely based on her, but not [only] on one celebrity—just celebrity culture in general."

== Music video ==
The music video for "Falling Down" centres around models in rehab with the members of Duran Duran acting as doctors and therapists, wearing white suits and thick glasses, counselling a group of the models and passing round pills. The band has publicly stated that Spears served as inspiration for the main character in the music video. Lead singer Simon Le Bon said that he hadn't spoken to Timberlake about the video after its release, but assumed he would be pleased. "I haven't spoken to him since the video has been made public, but he likes his pretty girls, so he probably would like it." He also commented on Spears' mental health issues which were also ongoing at the time. "I just wish she could accept help," Le Bon added.

Apart from the MTV-friendly version, an "R-rated" version featuring topless models was also made. It was shot in Los Angeles and directed by Anthony Mandler, who also did the video for the Killers' "When You Were Young". Models Allie Crandell and Tatiana Kovylina starred in the video.

The music video premiered on 16 October on Yahoo! Music.

== Commercial performance ==
In the UK, the single charted at No. 52, the second worst-performing single in Duran Duran's history after "Someone Else Not Me". Contrarily, "Falling Down" was a surprise hit in Italy, where it peaked at No. 2.

== Track listing ==
=== CD: Epic / 88697 19130 2 (UK) ===
1. "Falling Down" – 5:42
2. "(Reach Up for The) Sunrise" (live) – 3:26

=== CD: Epic / (US promo) ===
1. "Falling Down" (radio edit) – 3:40
2. "Falling Down" (extended version) – 5:42

=== CD: Epic 8-track promo (UK) ===
1. "Falling Down" (Sebastian Leger vocal mix) – 7:25
2. "Falling Down" (Sebastian Leger dub) – 6:14
3. "Falling Down" (T-empo main mix) – 7:36
4. "Falling Down" (Freeks main mix) – 7:12
5. "Falling Down" (Ashanti Boys main mix) – 6:03
6. "Falling Down" (Freeks instrumental) – 7:12
7. "Falling Down" (Sebastian Leger radio mix) – 3:48
8. "Falling Down" (radio edit) – 3:40

=== CD: Epic 8-track promo (US) ===
1. "Falling Down" (single edit) – 3:40
2. "Falling Down" (album version) – 5:42
3. "Falling Down" (Ashanti Boys main mix) – 6:03
4. "Falling Down" (Freeks main mix) – 7:12
5. "Falling Down" (Sebastian Leger vocal mix) – 3:48
6. "Falling Down" (Freeks instrumental) – 7:12
7. "Falling Down" (Sebastian Leger dub) – 6:14
8. "Falling Down" (Jeff Barringer mix) – 3:44

== Charts ==
Chart performance for "Falling Down"
Chart (2007)	Peak position
Czech Republic Airplay (ČNS IFPI)	6
Germany (GfK)	79
Italy (FIMI)	2
Switzerland (Schweizer Hitparade)	60
UK Singles (Official Charts)	52
US Adult Pop Airplay (Billboard)	25

== Additional personnel ==
- Justin Timberlake – producer, background vocals
- Jean-Marie Horvat – mixer
- Dom Brown – guitar
