= Someone Else Not Me =

2000 single by Duran Duran

Single by Duran Duran

from the album Pop Trash
- B-side: "Starting to Remember"
- Released: 8 May 2000
- Length: 4:48 (album version); 3:36 (radio edit)
- Label: Hollywood
- Songwriters: Simon Le Bon; James Bates; Warren Cuccurullo
- Producers: TV Mania; Syn Productions

Duran Duran singles chronology
"Electric Barbarella" (1997)	"Someone Else Not Me" (2000)	"Playing with Uranium" (2000)

"Someone Else Not Me" is a song by English rock band Duran Duran, released as the only single from their 10th studio album, Pop Trash (2000). It charted at number 26 in Italy and number 53 on the UK Singles Chart. It was the last single to feature Warren Cuccurullo as a guitarist.

== Chart performance ==
"Someone Else Not Me" reached number 53 in the United Kingdom and entered the top 30 in Italy, reaching number 26.

== Music video ==
The video was the first to be created entirely in Macromedia Flash animation, by web design firm Fullerene Productions (who also created the band's Flash-based official website).

== B-sides, bonus tracks and remixes ==
At Le Bon's request, the lyrics were translated into French and Spanish so he could record alternate versions, which were included as bonus tracks on various global releases:

- "Un Autre Que Moi" ("Someone Else Not Me" en Français) – 4:19
- "Alguien Que No Soy Yo" ("Someone Else Not Me" en Español) – 4:16

The B-side is "Starting to Remember".

== Track listing ==
CD: Hollywood / 0108845HWR (UK)

1. "Someone Else Not Me" (radio edit) – 3:35
2. "Someone Else Not Me" (album version) – 4:47
3. "Starting to Remember" – 2:38

== Personnel ==
- Simon Le Bon – vocals
- Warren Cuccurullo – guitar
- Nick Rhodes – keyboards

== Charts ==
Chart (2000)	Peak position
Italy (FIMI)	26
Scotland Singles (OCC)	63
UK Singles (OCC)	53
UK Indie (OCC)	10

== Release history ==
Region	Date	Format(s)	Label(s)	Ref.
United States	8 May 2000	Hot adult contemporary; modern adult contemporary radio	Hollywood	
United Kingdom	29 May 2000	CD; cassette	Hollywood	
