= Invisible (Duran Duran song) =

2021 single by Duran Duran

Single by Duran Duran

from the album Future Past
- Released: 19 May 2021
- Genre: Synth-pop
- Length: 3:11
- Label: BMG; Tape Modern
- Songwriters: Erol Alkan; Simon Le Bon; Nick Rhodes; John Taylor; Roger Taylor
- Producers: Erol Alkan; Duran Duran

Duran Duran singles chronology
"Last Night in the City" (2017)	"Invisible" (2021)	"More Joy!" (2021)

Music video
- "INVISIBLE" on YouTube

"Invisible" (stylized in all caps) is a song by the English pop rock band Duran Duran. It was released on 19 May 2021 as the lead single from their fifteenth studio album, Future Past (2021), and their 39th single overall.

The song debuted and peaked at number 45 on the UK Singles Sales Chart and number 44 on the UK Singles Downloads Chart. After going viral, the song has reached over 150 million streams on Spotify.

== Background and development ==
When asked about the origin of the song, singer Simon Le Bon said, "Invisible began as a story about a one-sided relationship and then transformed into something much bigger". He also said that the song started with its big drum track before anything else was added on.

== Music video ==
The music video for Invisible was made with Huxley, an artificial intelligence described as a "unique dreamer whose 'mind' [was] modelled after the cognitive and emotional processes of humans", with it being the first music video of the Future Past album to feature Huxley.

== In popular culture ==
In 2023, fans of the Metal Gear video game series began using the song in fan-made short-form videos of the series. This led to an inside joke where fans would gaslight other people into believing that the song was included in the soundtrack for Metal Gear Solid V: The Phantom Pain due to the similarities in the themes of the song and the video game.

Duran Duran responded to the meme on TikTok by reposting an edit of Metal Gear Solid 3: Snake Eater featuring the song and replied to several comments.

== Charts ==
Peak chart positions for "INVISIBLE"
Chart	Peak position
Belgium (Ultratop 50 Flanders)	146

== Cover version ==
Galleons, a transcontinental post-hardcore and mathcore band, released a mathcore cover of Invisible in 2025.
