= Danse Macabre (Duran Duran album) =

Studio album by Duran Duran
- Released: 27 October 2023
- Genres: Synth-pop; dance-rock; pop rock
- Length: 50:07
- Labels: BMG; Tape Modern
- Producers: Josh Blair; Duran Duran; Mr Hudson; Nile Rodgers

Duran Duran chronology
Future Past (2021)	Danse Macabre (2023)

Singles from Danse Macabre
- 1. "Danse Macabre" Released: 30 August 2023; 2. "Black Moonlight" Released: 21 September 2023; 3. "Psycho Killer" Released: 24 October 2023

Danse Macabre is the sixteenth studio album by the English pop rock band Duran Duran. It was released on 27 October 2023 through BMG and Tape Modern. A Halloween-themed album, the record includes three new tracks, covers, and reimagined versions of older Duran Duran material. Former guitarists Andy Taylor and Warren Cuccurullo appear, making their first appearances on a Duran Duran LP since 2004's Astronaut and 2000's Pop Trash, respectively. Nile Rodgers and Victoria De Angelis of Måneskin also feature as guest artists. It is the last album to feature original drummer Roger Taylor, following his definitive retirement from the band and music in 2026.

== Background and composition ==
On 20 March 2023, Duran Duran confirmed that they had an album slated for release later that year that would feature former guitarist Andy Taylor on a few select tracks. Inspiration for the concept album came from a Halloween show the band played in Las Vegas on 31 October 2022. As a result, singer Simon Le Bon stated that the record is "about a crazy Halloween party" and "supposed to be fun". Keyboardist Nick Rhodes revealed that the project "metamorphosed through a pure, organic process" and was made faster than anything they had done ever since their debut album. He also explained that the result is something they could not predict, citing the band's core elements—"emotion, mood, style and attitude"—as the essence of the album. It was summarised as "the soundtrack to their ultimate Halloween party". Founding member and bass player John Taylor added that the album "offers an interesting insight into the personality of the band" with music that "packs a real punch".

While Danse Macabre had already been available for pre-order in mid-August 2023, it was not officially announced until 30 August. The lead single of the same name was released the same day. According to Rhodes the song was intended to celebrate "the joy and madness of Halloween". Produced by the band, Josh Blair and Mr Hudson, the set of songs includes six covers—Billie Eilish's "Bury a Friend", Cerrone's "Supernature", the Rolling Stones' "Paint It Black", Siouxsie and the Banshees' "Spellbound", the Specials' "Ghost Town", and Talking Heads' "Psycho Killer"— and remakes of three older Duran Duran songs: 1981's "Night Boat", 1983's "Secret Oktober" (as "Secret Oktober 31st") and 1993's "Love Voodoo" renamed "Love Voudou". It also features "Super Lonely Freak", a mashup of the band's own "Lonely in Your Nightmare" (1982) and "Super Freak" by Rick James.

On 13 September 2024, an expanded version of the album titled Danse Macabre De Luxe was announced. The CD, digital and Blu-ray versions include three new tracks: "Masque of the Pink Death", an instrumental; a cover of the Electric Light Orchestra's "Evil Woman"; and a remake of the band's 1984 single "New Moon on Monday", retitled "New Moon (Dark Phase)". A vinyl box set additionally includes two more instrumentals and a spoken word piece.

== Critical reception ==
Professional ratings
Aggregate scores
Source	Rating
AnyDecentMusic?	6.8/10
Metacritic	72/100
Review scores
Source	Rating
AllMusic	4/5 stars
American Songwriter	4/5 stars
The Arts Desk	2/5 stars
Clash	7/10
Evening Standard	4/5 stars
The Line of Best Fit	7/10
Mojo	3/5 stars
musicOMH	2.5/5 stars
Record Collector	4/5 stars
Under the Radar	7.5/10

Danse Macabre was met with generally favourable reviews from music critics. At Metacritic, which assigns a normalized rating out of 100 to reviews from mainstream publications, the album received an average score of 72, based on nine reviews. The aggregator AnyDecentMusic? has the critical consensus of the album at a 6.7 out of 10, also based on seven reviews.

Stephen Thomas Erlewine in his review for AllMusic stated: "the charm of Danse Macabre lies in how Duran Duran seem unencumbered by expectations: they're lying back and having a good time, resulting in a record that captures their silly and serious sides in equal measure. Tina Benitez-Eves of American Songwriter praised the album, saying "whatever its brew, at its core, Danse Macabre is Duran Duran, 40-plus years later, sounding their best". Simon Heavisides of The Line of Best Fit stated that the album's "aesthetic avoids a cartoon rendering of that most spooky of seasons and instead leans into a cool darkness" and found it to be "a stylish, warm-hearted album with a sense of humour" that "takes a few risks and seeks to entertain". Emma Harrison of Clash wrote that "every track can be listened to in isolation, but by listening to the album chronologically, you can see how the band are using music to achieve a balance between dark and light".

Record Collector felt that "for all its dark themes [...] the main aim is ghoulish fun", concluding that "a mixed (body) bag it may be, but Danse Macabre is a fiendishly fun collection that only the undead would remain unmoved by". Ben Hogwood of MusicOMH wrote that "perhaps not surprisingly the new material fares best" and the band's "fan base will lap it up readily, but ultimately the feeling is that of being tricked rather than treated". Mojo remarked that "no new ground is broken, but everyone emerges unscathed". Guy Oddy of The Arts Desk wrote: "anyone expecting a reworked film soundtrack to The Texas Chain Saw Massacre might be advised to lower their expectations".

== Track listing ==
Danse Macabre (original edition)
No.	Title	Writer(s)	Original artist	Length
1.	"Nightboat"	Simon Le Bon; Nick Rhodes; Roger Taylor; John Taylor; Andy Taylor	Duran Duran, 1981	4:23
2.	"Black Moonlight" (featuring Nile Rodgers)	Le Bon; Rhodes; R. Taylor; J. Taylor; Rodgers	Original song	3:06
3.	"Love Voudou"	Le Bon; Rhodes; J. Taylor; Warren Cuccurullo	Duran Duran, 1993	4:29
4.	"Bury a Friend"	Billie Eilish; Finneas O'Connell	Billie Eilish, 2019	3:04
5.	"Supernature"	Marc Cerrone; Alain Wisniak; Lili Marlen Premilovich	Cerrone, 1977	3:44
6.	"Danse Macabre"	Le Bon; Rhodes; R. Taylor; J. Taylor; Benjamin Hudson McIldowie	Original song	4:22
7.	"Secret Oktober 31st"	Le Bon; Rhodes; R. Taylor; J. Taylor; A. Taylor	Duran Duran, 1983	4:22
8.	"Ghost Town"	Jerry Dammers	The Specials, 1981	3:00
9.	"Paint It Black"	Jagger–Richards	The Rolling Stones, 1966	2:38
10.	"Super Lonely Freak"	Le Bon; Rhodes; R. Taylor; J. Taylor; A. Taylor; Rick James; Alonzo Miller	Duran Duran, 1982 / Rick James, 1981	4:27
11.	"Spellbound"	Susan Ballion; Peter Edward Clarke; John McGeoch; Steven Severin	Siouxsie and the Banshees, 1981	3:27
12.	"Psycho Killer" (featuring Victoria De Angelis)	David Byrne; Chris Frantz; Tina Weymouth	Talking Heads, 1977	4:25
13.	"Confession in the Afterlife"	Le Bon; Rhodes; R. Taylor; J. Taylor; McIldowie	Original song	4:33
Total length:				50:00

Danse Macabre De Luxe (CD/digital edition)
No.	Title	Writer(s)	Original artist	Length
1.	"Masque of the Pink Death" (instrumental)	J. Taylor; Rhodes; R. Taylor; Le Bon	Original song	3:17
2.	"Nightboat"	Le Bon; Rhodes; R. Taylor; J. Taylor; A. Taylor	Duran Duran, 1981	4:23
3.	"Black Moonlight" (featuring Nile Rodgers)	Le Bon; Rhodes; R. Taylor; J. Taylor; Rodgers	Original song	3:06
4.	"Love Voudou"	Le Bon; Rhodes; J. Taylor; Cuccurullo	Duran Duran, 1993	4:29
5.	"Bury a Friend"	Eilish; O'Connell	Billie Eilish, 2019	3:04
6.	"Supernature"	Cerrone; Wisniak; Premilovich	Cerrone, 1977	3:44
7.	"Evil Woman"	Jeff Lynne	Electric Light Orchestra, 1975	3:50
8.	"Danse Macabre"	Le Bon; Rhodes; R. Taylor; J. Taylor; McIldowie	Original song	4:22
9.	"Secret Oktober 31st"	Le Bon; Rhodes; R. Taylor; J. Taylor; A. Taylor	Duran Duran, 1983	4:22
10.	"Ghost Town"	Dammers	The Specials, 1981	3:00
11.	"Paint It Black"	Jagger; Richards	The Rolling Stones, 1966	2:38
12.	"Super Lonely Freak"	Le Bon; Rhodes; R. Taylor; J. Taylor; A. Taylor; James; Miller	Duran Duran, 1982 / Rick James, 1981	4:27
13.	"New Moon (Dark Phase)"	Le Bon; J. Taylor; R. Taylor; A. Taylor; Rhodes	Duran Duran, 1983	4:03
14.	"Spellbound"	Ballion; Clarke; McGeoch; Severin	Siouxsie and the Banshees, 1981	3:27
15.	"Psycho Killer" (featuring Victoria De Angelis)	Byrne; Frantz; Weymouth	Talking Heads, 1977	4:25
16.	"Confession in the Afterlife"	Le Bon; Rhodes; R. Taylor; J. Taylor; McIldowie	Original song	4:33

Danse Macabre De Luxe (box set bonus LP)
No.	Title	Writer(s)	Length
1.	"Evil Woman"	Lynne	3:50
2.	"New Moon (Dark Phase)"	Le Bon; J. Taylor; R. Taylor; A. Taylor; Rhodes	4:03
3.	"Spooky" (instrumental)	Mike Shapiro, Harry Middlebrooks Jr., James Cobb, Buddy Buie	3:14
4.	"The Visitor" (instrumental)		2:20
5.	"Instructions for a Séance" (spoken word)		1:35
6.	"Masque of the Pink Death" (instrumental)	J. Taylor; Rhodes; R. Taylor; Le Bon	3:17
7.	"Dialogues of the Dead" (instrumental)		2:55

== Personnel ==
Duran Duran

- Simon Le Bon – vocals, production
- Nick Rhodes – keyboards, production
- John Taylor – bass, production; guitar (track 6)
- Roger Taylor – drums, production

Additional musicians

- Andy Taylor – guitar (1–2, 4–5, 7–12)
- Warren Cuccurullo – guitar (3, 6)
- Anna Ross – backing vocals
- Rachael O'Connor – backing vocals
- Joshua Blair – percussion (1–7, 9–12), strings (1, 3, 4, 7, 12, 13), guitar (4), piano (9, 13), synthesizer (10)
- Nile Rodgers – guitar (2, 5)
- Nate Merchant – bass, drum programming, programming (3–12)
- Alexandra AStama – backing vocals (3)
- Mr Hudson – loops (6), guitar (13)
- Simon Willescroft – saxophone (8, 10)
- Johnny Thirkell – flugelhorn (8)
- Dominic Brown – guitar (12, 13)
- Victoria De Angelis – bass (12)

Technical

- Joshua Blair – production, engineering
- Nile Rodgers – production (2)
- Mr Hudson – production (6, 13)
- Bob Clearmountain – mixing
- John Webber – engineering
- Andy Taylor – engineering (1, 2, 5–12)
- Richard Woodcraft – engineering (1, 12)
- Ed Farrell – engineering (2, 3, 5–13)
- Billy Halliday – engineering (3, 5, 7–12)
- John X. Volaitis – engineering (3, 6)
- Russell Graham – engineering (5)
- Phil Kemp – instrument technician (1, 2, 5, 12, 13)
- Kevin Bell – instrument technician (2, 5, 8–13)

== Charts ==
Chart performance for Danse Macabre
Chart (2023)	Peak position
Austrian Albums (Ö3 Austria)	17
Belgian Albums (Ultratop Flanders)	22
Belgian Albums (Ultratop Wallonia)	8
Dutch Albums (Album Top 100)	31
Finnish Albums (Suomen virallinen lista)	34
French Albums (SNEP)	88
German Albums (Offizielle Top 100)	14
Hungarian Physical Albums (MAHASZ)	24
Italian Albums (FIMI)	9
Japanese Digital Albums (Oricon)	42
Portuguese Albums (AFP)	24
Scottish Albums (Official Charts)	5
Spanish Albums (Promusicae)	56
Swiss Albums (Schweizer Hitparade)	12
UK Albums (Official Charts)	4
UK Independent Albums (Official Charts)	2
US Billboard 200	57
