= Future Past (Duran Duran album) =

Studio album by Duran Duran
- Released: 22 October 2021
- Genres: Synth-pop; art pop
- Length: 50:59
- Labels: BMG; Tape Modern
- Producers: Erol Alkan; Joshua Blair; Duran Duran; Giorgio Moroder

Duran Duran chronology
Paper Gods (2015)	Future Past (2021)	Danse Macabre (2023)

Singles from Future Past
- 1. "Invisible" Released: 19 May 2021; 2. "More Joy!" Released: 5 August 2021; 3. "Anniversary" Released: 31 August 2021; 4. "Tonight United" Released: 24 September 2021; 5. "Give It All Up" Released: 20 October 2021; 6. "Laughing Boy" Released: 9 February 2022

Future Past is the fifteenth studio album by the English pop rock band Duran Duran, released on 22 October 2021. It is the band's first album to be released through BMG, and their first since 2015's Paper Gods six years prior.

The album, co-produced by the band alongside Giorgio Moroder and Erol Alkan, also features guest appearances by Tove Lo, Ivorian Doll, Japanese band Chai, and Mike Garson. Blur's Graham Coxon is the guitarist on the album.

The band released the album's first single "Invisible" on 19 May 2021. The tracks "More Joy!" featuring Chai, "Anniversary", "Tonight United" and "Give It All Up" featuring Tove Lo were also released in advance of the album.

== Background and content ==
John Taylor described Future Past as a "very emotionally deep album", revealing that the lyrics were primarily written before 2020's COVID-19 lockdowns: "Many of the songs are about emotional crises, or long-term intimacy issues, let's call them. When we came back after lockdown, I felt that those lyrics, particularly 'Invisible', spoke to the moment, because the last 18 months have really been about intimacy politics." Simon Le Bon later revealed that making of the album started in November 2018 during a performance in the BBC Radio Theatre, broadcast live on BBC Radio 2, BBC Sounds and BBC iPlayer in December 2021. He credited the British guitarist Graham Coxon as a significant figure in the creation of the album, stating that "he changed the picture of Duran Duran, he upped all of our games and he played some of the most incredible guitar that I've (Simon Le Bon) ever heard on any album".

== Cover art ==
The cover is a colourised and combined image of two black-and-white pictures by Japanese photographer Daisuke Yokota. Nick Rhodes met Yokota in 2017 while researching for a documentary about Japanese photographers. The album's art director Rory McCartney laid the images over the top of one another, creating the effect of a stationary silhouette in red with another silhouette in green moving beyond it, which resonated with McCartney.

== Critical reception ==
Professional ratings
Aggregate scores
Source	Rating
Metacritic	75/100
Review scores
Source	Rating
AllMusic	4/5 stars
Clash	7/10
laut.de	4/5 stars
musicOMH	3.5/5 stars
Record Collector	4/5 stars
Rolling Stone	4/5 stars
SuperDeluxeEdition	4/5
The Telegraph	3/5 stars
Uncut	3.5/5 stars

Future Past was met with generally favourable reviews from music critics. At Metacritic, which assigns a normalised rating out of 100 to reviews from mainstream publications, the album received an average score of 75, based on six reviews. Clash stated: "‘Future Past’ – when it works – is a blast of ridiculous 80s themed fun." musicOMH.com called it "a playfully flawed triumph". "If it had come out in 1985, it would have ruled the world", The Telegraph wrote.

== Track listing ==
Future Past standard edition track listing
No.	Title	Writer(s)	Producer(s)	Length
1.	"Invisible"	Simon Le Bon; John Taylor; Roger Taylor; Nick Rhodes; Erol Alkan	Duran Duran; Alkan	3:11
2.	"All of You"	Le Bon; J. Taylor; R. Taylor; Rhodes; Graham Coxon	Duran Duran; Alkan	4:05
3.	"Give It All Up" (featuring Tove Lo)	Le Bon; J. Taylor; R. Taylor; Rhodes; Coxon; Alkan; Tove Lo	Duran Duran; Alkan; Peter Karlsson^{[a]}	5:07
4.	"Anniversary"	Le Bon; J. Taylor; R. Taylor; Rhodes; Coxon; Alkan	Duran Duran; Alkan	5:18
5.	"Future Past"	Le Bon; J. Taylor; R. Taylor; Rhodes; Coxon; Alkan	Duran Duran; Alkan	3:52
6.	"Beautiful Lies"	Le Bon; J. Taylor; R. Taylor; Rhodes; Giorgio Moroder	Duran Duran; Moroder; Joshua Blair^{[a]}	3:36
7.	"Tonight United"	Le Bon; J. Taylor; R. Taylor; Rhodes; Moroder	Duran Duran; Moroder; Blair^{[a]}	3:07
8.	"Wing"	Le Bon; J. Taylor; R. Taylor; Rhodes; Coxon; Mark Ronson	Duran Duran; Blair	5:19
9.	"Nothing Less^{[c]}"	Le Bon; J. Taylor; R. Taylor; Rhodes; Alkan	Duran Duran; Alkan	4:25
10.	"Hammerhead^{[c]}" (featuring Ivorian Doll)	Le Bon; J. Taylor; R. Taylor; Rhodes; Alkan; Vanessa Mahi; Lei Jennings; Christopher Layton	Duran Duran; Alkan	3:33
11.	"More Joy!" (featuring Chai)	Le Bon; J. Taylor; R. Taylor; Rhodes; Coxon; Alkan	Duran Duran; Alkan; Kaz Haga^{[b]}; Mathieu Kranich^{[b]}; Hannie Knox^{[b]}	3:39
12.	"Falling" (featuring Mike Garson)	Le Bon; J. Taylor; R. Taylor; Rhodes	Duran Duran; Alkan	5:49
Total length:				50:59

Future Past deluxe edition track listing
No.	Title	Writer(s)	Producer(s)	Length
6.	"Velvet Newton"	Le Bon; J. Taylor; R. Taylor; Rhodes; Coxon	Duran Duran; Alkan	2:40
7.	"Beautiful Lies"	Le Bon; J. Taylor; R. Taylor; Rhodes; Moroder	Duran Duran; Moroder; Blair^{[a]}	3:36
8.	"Tonight United"	Le Bon; J. Taylor; R. Taylor; Rhodes; Moroder	Duran Duran; Moroder; Blair^{[a]}	3:08
9.	"Wing"	Le Bon; J. Taylor; R. Taylor; Rhodes; Coxon; Ronson	Duran Duran; Blair	5:19
10.	"Nothing Less^{[c]}"	Le Bon; J. Taylor; R. Taylor; Rhodes; Alkan	Duran Duran; Alkan	4:26
11.	"Laughing Boy"	Le Bon; J. Taylor; R. Taylor; Rhodes; Coxon	Duran Duran; Alkan	4:55
12.	"Hammerhead^{[c]}" (featuring Ivorian Doll)	Le Bon; J. Taylor; R. Taylor; Rhodes; Alkan; Mahi; Jennings; Layton	Duran Duran; Alkan	3:34
13.	"Invocation"	Le Bon; J. Taylor; R. Taylor; Rhodes; Coxon; Alkan	Duran Duran; Alkan	2:08
14.	"More Joy!" (featuring Chai)	Le Bon; J. Taylor; R. Taylor; Rhodes; Coxon; Alkan	Duran Duran; Alkan; Haga^{[b]}; Kranich^{[b]}; Knox^{[b]}	3:39
15.	"Falling" (featuring Mike Garson)	Le Bon; J. Taylor; R. Taylor; Rhodes	Duran Duran; Alkan	5:49
Total length:				60:46

Japanese edition bonus track
No.	Title	Writer(s)	Producer(s)	Length
15.	"Five Years"	David Bowie	Bowie; Ken Scott	4:45
Total length:				65:35

=== Notes ===
- ^a signifies vocal producer
- ^b signifies an assistant producer
- ^c These tracks are not included on vinyl version

== Personnel ==
Duran Duran

- Simon Le Bon – vocals
- Nick Rhodes – keyboards
- John Taylor – bass
- Roger Taylor – drums

Additional musicians

- Barli – backing vocals
- Graham Coxon – guitars
- Joshua Blair – piano, programming (all tracks); string arrangement (1–3, 5–8), keyboards (3–8), guitars (6), additional keyboards, keyboards programming (9, 10, 12)
- Erol Alkan – programming (1, 9), synthesizers (1, 3), drum programming (2–5, 9, 10, 12), hand clap (2, 10), percussion, tambourine (2)
- Tove Lo – vocals (3)
- Giorgio Moroder – additional keyboards (6, 7)
- Saffron Le Bon – backing vocals (6, 7, 9, 10)
- Mark Ronson – guitars (8)
- Ivorian Doll – vocals (10)
- Chai – vocals (11)
- Mike Garson – piano (12)

Technical

- Wendy Laister – executive production
- John Webber – mastering
- Mark "Spike" Stent – mixing
- Joshua Blair – engineering, Pro Tools
- Austin Creek – engineering (12)
- Peter Karlsson – vocal engineering (3)
- Cory Bice – vocal engineering (3)
- Ritchie Kennedy – additional engineering (1, 2, 4, 5, 9, 10), engineering assistance (3)
- Tom Herbert – engineering assistance (1–5, 9, 10, 12)
- Ed Farrell – engineering assistance (1–5, 9, 10, 12)
- Matt Wolach – mixing assistance
- Benji Compston – production management
- Hannie Knox – production assistance

Design

- Rory McCartney – art direction
- Daisuke Yokota – cover art, photography
- Nick Rhodes – band photo

== Charts ==
Chart performance for Future Past
Chart (2021)	Peak position
Australian Albums (ARIA)	16
Austrian Albums (Ö3 Austria)	9
Belgian Albums (Ultratop Flanders)	16
Belgian Albums (Ultratop Wallonia)	6
Canadian Albums (Billboard)	53
Czech Albums (ČNS IFPI)	39
Danish Albums (Hitlisten)	12
Dutch Albums (Album Top 100)	9
Finnish Albums (Suomen virallinen lista)	21
French Albums (SNEP)	83
German Albums (Offizielle Top 100)	8
Hungarian Albums (MAHASZ)	29
Irish Albums (Official Charts)	23
Italian Albums (FIMI)	10
Japan Top Album Sales (Billboard Japan)	51
New Zealand Albums (RMNZ)	35
Portuguese Albums (AFP)	6
Scottish Albums (Official Charts)	4
Slovak Albums (ČNS IFPI)	22
Spanish Albums (Promusicae)	36
Swiss Albums (Schweizer Hitparade)	10
UK Albums (Official Charts)	3
UK Independent Albums (Official Charts)	1
US Billboard 200	28
US Independent Albums (Billboard)	2
US Top Alternative Albums (Billboard)	4
US Top Rock Albums (Billboard)	3
