= Paper Gods =

2015 studio album by Duran Duran

- Standard and deluxe edition cover (Note: On the Target-exclusive edition, the shades of blue in the background are replaced with additional shades of pink.)

Studio album by Duran Duran
- Released: 11 September 2015
- Studios: Battersea Park (London); Zelig (London) (Note: Additional recording); The Village (Los Angeles)
- Genres: New wave; pop rock; pop
- Length: 57:21
- Label: Warner Bros.
- Producers: Josh Blair; Duran Duran; Mr Hudson; Nile Rodgers; Mark Ronson

Duran Duran chronology
A Diamond in the Mind: Live 2011 (2012)	Paper Gods (2015)	Future Past (2021)

Singles from Paper Gods
- 1. "Pressure Off" Released: 19 June 2015; 2. "Last Night in the City" Released: 10 March 2017

Professional ratings
Aggregate scores
Source	Rating
Metacritic	64/100
Review scores
Source	Rating
AllMusic	3.5/5 stars
Billboard	3.5/5 stars
Consequence of Sound	B−
Drowned in Sound	5/10
Entertainment Weekly	B−
The Guardian	3/5 stars
Magnet	4/5 stars
PopMatters	8/10
Q	3/5 stars
Rolling Stone	3.5/5 stars

Paper Gods is the fourteenth studio album by the English pop rock band Duran Duran, released on 11 September 2015 by Warner Bros. Records. The album was produced by Mr Hudson and Joshua Blair, who had worked with the band on All You Need Is Now (2010) and A Diamond in the Mind: Live 2011 (2012); Nile Rodgers, who had previously first worked on the band's "The Reflex", his remixed version reaching number one, "The Wild Boys" single and Notorious album; and Mark Ronson, who produced All You Need Is Now. The first single, "Pressure Off", features vocals from American singer Janelle Monáe. The album was supported by the Paper Gods on Tour.

== Release ==
The album cover, designed by artist Alex Israel, consists of his 2013 painting titled "Sky Backdrop" that features icons that represent the band's history. This includes lips and the eye painted by artist Patrick Nagel for their Rio album; also representing the Rio album is a chauffeur's cap alluding to that record's closing track "The Chauffeur"; a pink telephone, champagne glass and the saxophone representing the single "Rio"; a sumo wrestler representing their controversial video for "Girls on Film"; Duran Duran's teeth are shown to be from "The Wild Boys"; the Eiffel Tower is a reference to the title song from the film A View to a Kill; a rocket from the greatest hits album, Decade; a silhouette of a female representing the single "Skin Trade"; an image of a tiger and a snake nodding to their third album Seven and the Ragged Tiger; a white shoe from the single cover and the music video of "Come Undone"; a stylized ice cream cone taken from their "Perfect Day" single. The deluxe physical copy of the record comes with sixteen stickers of Duran Duran iconography to mirror the album cover.

== Promotion ==
The band announced a tour of the United States and the United Kingdom to coincide with the album's release.

The lead single from the album, "Pressure Off", was released in the United States on 19 June, first via Microsoft's Xbox Music. The song subsequently appeared on Google Music.

== Commercial performance and critical reception ==
The album entered the UK Albums Chart at number five, becoming the band's ninth top-five album overall and making them one of only a handful of bands who have scored top-five albums in four consecutive decades. In the United States, it entered the Billboard 200 at number 10 and became their first top-10 album since Duran Duran (1993). In its second week, the album fell to number 76, and in its third and final week fell to number 194, though it re-entered the Billboard 200 at number 45 in January 2016. In Italy, the album peaked at number two.

Paper Gods was met with generally favourable reviews from music critics. At Metacritic, which assigns a normalized rating out of 100 to reviews from mainstream publications, the album received an average score of 64, based on 14 reviews.

== Track listing ==
All tracks are written by John Taylor, Roger Taylor, Nick Rhodes and Simon Le Bon, with additional writers noted.

Standard edition
No.	Title	Writer(s)	Producer(s)	Length
1.	"Paper Gods" (featuring Mr Hudson)	Mr Hudson	Duran Duran; Mr Hudson	7:04
2.	"Last Night in the City" (featuring Kiesza)	Kiesza; Hudson	Duran Duran; Hudson; Josh Blair	4:44
3.	"You Kill Me with Silence"	Mr Hudson	Duran Duran; Hudson	4:26
4.	"Pressure Off" (featuring Janelle Monáe and Nile Rodgers)	Rodgers; Mark Ronson; Hudson; Monáe	Duran Duran; Ronson; Rodgers; Hudson; Blair^{[a]}	4:21
5.	"Face for Today"	Dom Brown	Duran Duran; Blair	3:52
6.	"Danceophobia"	Brown; Hudson	Duran Duran; Blair; Hudson^{[b]}	4:14
7.	"What Are the Chances?"	Brown; Hudson	Duran Duran; Blair; Hudson^{[b]}	4:55
8.	"Sunset Garage"	Hudson	Duran Duran; Hudson; Blair	4:43
9.	"Change the Skyline" (featuring Jonas Bjerre)	Hudson	Duran Duran; Blair; Rodgers^{[b]}	3:57
10.	"Butterfly Girl"	Brown	Duran Duran; Blair	3:15
11.	"Only in Dreams"	Rodgers; Ronson; Hudson	Duran Duran; Rodgers; Ronson; Hudson^{[b]}; Blair^{[b]}	6:05
12.	"The Universe Alone"		Duran Duran; Blair	5:48
Total length:				57:40

Deluxe edition (bonus tracks)
No.	Title	Writer(s)	Producer(s)	Length
13.	"Planet Roaring"	Brown	Duran Duran; Blair	3:49
14.	"Valentine Stones"		Duran Duran; Blair	3:30
15.	"Northern Lights"		Duran Duran; Blair	5:13
Total length:				69:54

Target-exclusive edition (bonus tracks)
No.	Title	Producer(s)	Length
13.	"On Evil Beach"	Duran Duran; Blair	2:48
14.	"Cinderella Ride"	Duran Duran; Blair	3:56
Total length:			63:05

=== Notes ===
- ^{^[a]} signifies lead vocal production
- ^{^[b]} signifies an additional producer

== Personnel ==
Credits adapted from the liner notes of the deluxe edition of Paper Gods.

=== Duran Duran ===
- Simon Le Bon
- Nick Rhodes
- John Taylor
- Roger Taylor

=== Additional musicians ===
- Mr Hudson – vocals (track 1)
- David Emery – additional drum programming (track 1)
- Kiesza – vocals (track 2)
- Janelle Monáe – vocals (track 4)
- Nile Rodgers – featured performer (track 4)
- Davide Rossi – string arrangement and performance (tracks 4, 5, 7, 12, 15)
- Josh Blair – string arrangement (tracks 5, 7, 12)
- Lindsay Lohan – special guest vocals (track 6)
- John Frusciante – guitars (tracks 7, 10, 12, 15)
- Hollie Cook – additional vocals (track 8)
- Jonas Bjerre – featured performer (track 9)
- Dom Brown – guitars (tracks 10, 15)
- Anna Ross – additional vocals (tracks 10, 13)
- Voce Chamber Choir – additional voices (track 12)
- London Youth Chamber Choir – additional voices (track 12)
- Suzi Digby – conducting, artistic direction (track 12)
- Toby Young – choir arrangement (track 12)
- Steve Jones – guitars (track 13)

=== Technical ===
- Duran Duran – production (all tracks)
- Mr Hudson – production (tracks 1–4, 8); additional production (tracks 6, 7, 11)
- Josh Blair – production (tracks 2, 5–10, 12–15); lead vocal production (track 4); additional production (track 11); mixing (tracks 14, 15); engineering (all tracks)
- Mark Ronson – production (tracks 4, 11)
- Nile Rodgers – production (tracks 4, 11); additional production (track 9)
- Riccardo Damian – Pro Tools operator (tracks 4, 11)
- Graham Russell – Janelle session engineering (track 4)
- Ghian Wright – Janelle session engineering (track 4)
- Jake Valentine – Janelle session engineering assistance (track 4)
- Mark "Spike" Stent – mixing at Mixsuite and Battersea Park Studios (London)
- Geoff Swan – mix engineering assistance
- Ted Jensen – mastering at Sterling Sound (New York City)
- Wendy Laister – executive production

=== Artwork ===
- Alex Israel – artwork, art direction
- China Chow – creative direction, art direction
- Brian Roettinger – art direction, logo
- Nick Rhodes – photography

== Charts ==
=== Weekly charts ===
Weekly chart performance for Paper Gods
Chart (2015)	Peak position
Australian Albums (ARIA)	19
Austrian Albums (Ö3 Austria)	24
Belgian Albums (Ultratop Flanders)	19
Belgian Albums (Ultratop Wallonia)	8
Canadian Albums (Billboard)	7
Croatian Albums (HDU)	10
Czech Albums (ČNS IFPI)	14
Danish Albums (Hitlisten)	27
Dutch Albums (Album Top 100)	4
Finnish Albums (Suomen virallinen lista)	28
French Albums (SNEP)	60
German Albums (Offizielle Top 100)	24
Greek Albums (IFPI)	13
Hungarian Albums (MAHASZ)	6
Irish Albums (IRMA)	27
Italian Albums (FIMI)	2
Japanese Albums (Oricon)	45
New Zealand Albums (RMNZ)	24
Portuguese Albums (AFP)	16
Scottish Albums (Official Charts)	6
Spanish Albums (Promusicae)	18
Swiss Albums (Schweizer Hitparade)	15
UK Albums (Official Charts)	5
US Billboard 200	10
US Top Alternative Albums (Billboard)	2

=== Year-end charts ===
Year-end chart performance for Paper Gods
Chart (2016)	Position
US Top Alternative Albums (Billboard)	46
