= TV Mania =

British-American electronic band founded in 1995

- Genres: Experimental; electronic
- Years active: 1995–2001
- Label: The Orchard/Beatport
- Past members: Nick Rhodes; Warren Cuccurullo

TV Mania was a British-American electronic band founded in 1995 that consisted of keyboardist Nick Rhodes and guitarist Warren Cuccurullo (both of Duran Duran), known for the 2013 release of a long-lost album, Bored with Prozac and the Internet?

== History ==
This long-running side project, which Rhodes and Cuccurullo returned to whenever work on various Duran Duran projects slowed down, produced more than 60 songs, but did not see a commercial release at the time, although the Duran Duran album Medazzaland contained some re-worked TV Mania material. A few songs have appeared on Cuccurullo's website and in the 2004 movie Trollywood, directed by Madeleine Farley.

The project was thought to be largely abandoned since Cuccurullo's dismissal from Duran Duran in 2001.

Production of the Duran Duran albums Medazzaland and Pop Trash by Cuccurullo, Rhodes and Anthony J. Resta was also credited to TV Mania, as well as SYN Productions, the production company founded by Simon Le Bon, his wife Yasmin, and Nick Wood. This was a departure from previous albums, where production was always credited to Duran Duran plus any outside producer.

After Rhodes came upon the original TV Mania DAT master tapes in a storage facility, an official release was planned.

== Bored with Prozac and the Internet? ==
Bored with Prozac and the Internet?

Studio album by TV Mania
- Released: 11 March 2013
- Recorded: 1995–1996
- Length: 44:00
- Label: The Orchard/Beatport
- Producer: TV Mania

In 2013, the long lost TV Mania album, Bored with Prozac and the Internet?, finally saw an official release on vinyl and a limited edition box set. The artwork was created by Rhodes and Andrew Day and features a cover illustration by Vania Zouravliov. It was released through the Vinyl Factory and digitally via The Orchard/Beatport.

The album was recorded from 1995 to 1996 by Rhodes and Cuccurullo as a side project of their full-time band, Duran Duran. The recordings remained unreleased for 17 years after having been presumed lost. The chance discovery of the album master tapes by Rhodes led to the set's 2013 release.
