= Dominic Brown =

English musician (born 1972)

Dom Brown
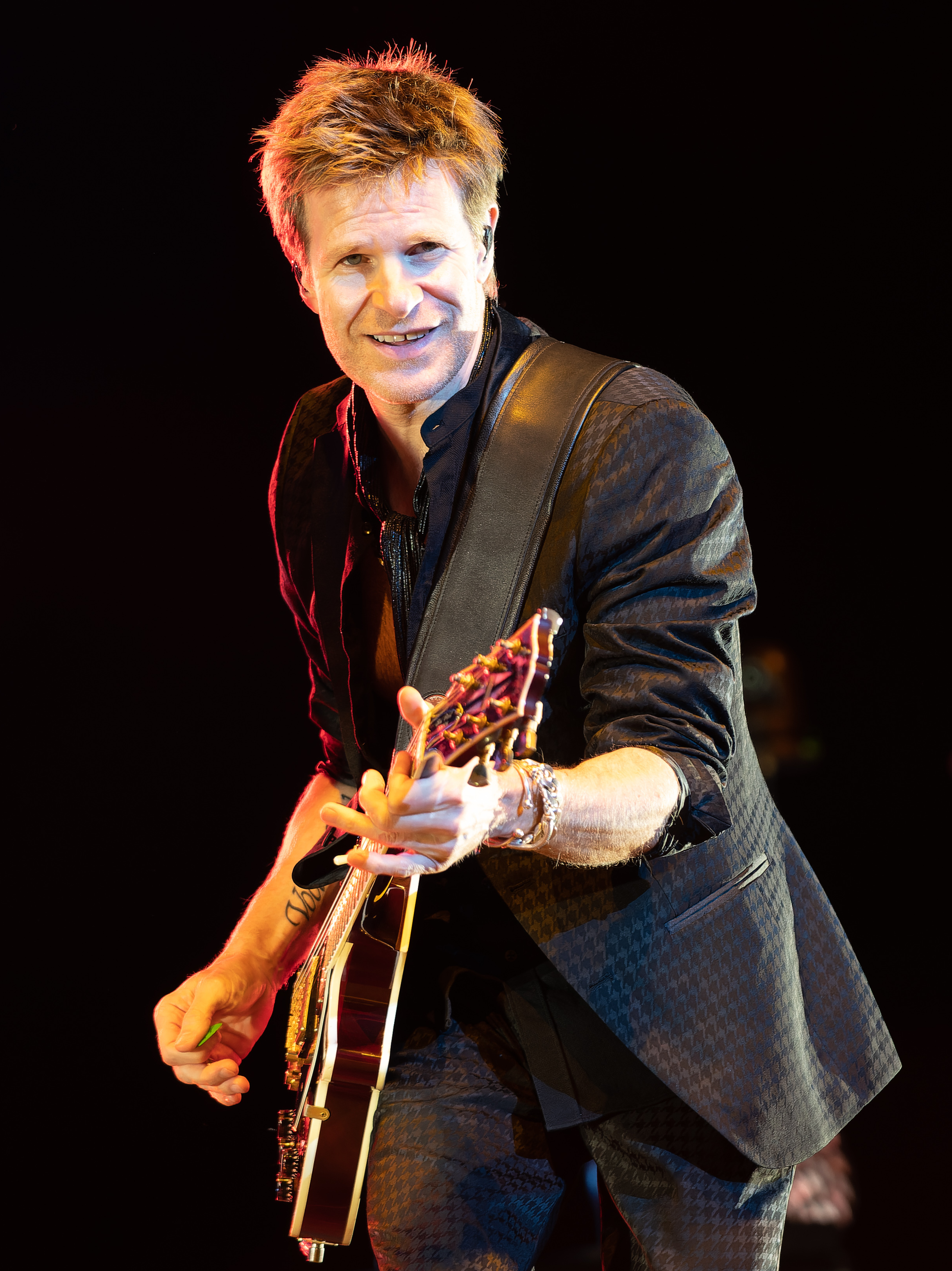
- Brown performing in 2023

Background information
- Also known as: Dom Brown
- Born: Dominic Brown
- Origin: London
- Genres: Pop, rock, R&B
- Occupations: Guitarist, songwriter, musician
- Instruments: Guitar, vocals
- Years active: 1988–present
- Website: dombrown.com

Dominic Brown is an English guitarist and singer-songwriter who has worked with many popular musicians, including Duran Duran, Elton John, Lionel Richie and Take That. He has also done both studio and live recordings with Justin Timberlake, Liam Gallagher, and the Sugababes, along with many others.

== Career ==
Brown began playing guitar at the age of 14, and by 16 had put together the band Nexus, based in Twickenham. He was soon touring with his father, musician Rob Brown. He has performed solo and in his own bands around the world, as well as serving as a sessions and live backup player for numerous other performers.

Brown first appeared with Duran Duran in December 2004 as a stand-in for ill guitarist Andy Taylor, and performed in Taylor's place several more times over the following two years. After Taylor left the band in October 2006, Brown was hired to record guitar parts for their next album, Red Carpet Massacre (2007), and perform on the supporting world tour. He also played with the band at the Concert for Diana and Live Earth London at Wembley Stadium. Brown continues in his role as Duran Duran's guitarist - albeit not as a full member of the band. He co-wrote 13 of the 15 tracks on the band's 2011 album All You Need Is Now and 4 of the 12 tracks on their 2015 album Paper Gods.

Brown's solo albums are published by the independent UK record label Remedy Records.

== Discography ==
=== Solo ===
- Touch The Flames (2004)
- Between The Lines (2007)
- Blue to Brown (2013)
- In My Bones (2021)

=== Duran Duran ===
- Red Carpet Massacre (2007)
- All You Need Is Now (2011)
- Paper Gods (2015)
- Danse Macabre (2023)
