= Medazzaland =

Studio album by Duran Duran
- Released: 14 October 1997
- Recorded: 1995–1997
- Studios: Privacy (Battersea); Metropolis (Chiswick); Sound Techniques (Boston); Bopnique (Chelmsford); Long View Farm (North Brookfield); Crescent Moon (Miami)
- Genres: Alternative rock; electronica; electronic rock
- Length: 53:17
- Label: Capitol
- Producers: TV Mania; Syn Pro Tokyo; Anthony J. Resta; Bob St. John

Duran Duran chronology
Thank You (1995)	Medazzaland (1997)	Night Versions (1998)

Singles from Medazzaland
- 1. "Out of My Mind" Released: 27 March 1997; 2. "Electric Barbarella" Released: 16 September 1997

Professional ratings
Review scores
Source	Rating
AllMusic	2.5/5 stars
The Encyclopedia of Popular Music	3/5 stars
Entertainment Weekly	B
Jam!	4/5 stars
Rolling Stone	3/5 stars
The Rolling Stone Album Guide	2/5 stars

Medazzaland is the ninth studio album by the English pop rock band Duran Duran. It was released on 14 October 1997 by Capitol Records solely in North America, Latin America and Japan. The title is a reference to the anesthetic midazolam, which Simon Le Bon was given during dental surgery. It reached number 58 on the Billboard 200 and number 66 on RPM's albums chart.

Medazzaland was available in Europe as an import or digital download, and it was only in 2021 (when the band signed a deal for the album with BMG) when it was officially released in the UK on various digital platforms. A physical 25th anniversary release on CD and coloured vinyl followed in 2022.

== Singles ==
In March 1997, the single for "Out of My Mind" from the soundtrack to the film The Saint was released internationally on Virgin Records. It peaked at number 21 on the UK chart in May. The music video for "Out of My Mind" was filmed by director Dean Karr at Český Krumlov Castle in Český Krumlov, Czech Republic.

The lead single, "Electric Barbarella" (a nod to the film Barbarella, from which the band took their name), was released on 16 September in the United States, and peaked at number 52 on the Billboard Hot 100 on 1 November. It was touted as the first ever song by a major label artist available for digital purchase/download on the internet.

== Release ==
The album was eventually released on 14 October 1997 in North America and Japan. Due to poor sales, plans for a UK release were pushed back, and, later, shelved indefinitely by EMI/Capitol. It was not physically released in any other area of the world for many years, although in July 2008 the album was made available to buy digitally through iTunes Store in Europe and the US.

== Track listing ==
All tracks are produced by TV Mania in association with Syn Pro Tokyo except where noted.

All tracks are written by Nick Rhodes, Warren Cuccurullo and Simon Le Bon, except where noted.

No.	Title	Writer(s)	Producer(s)	Length
1.	"Medazzaland"	Rhodes; Cuccurullo; Le Bon; John Taylor	TV Mania; Syn Pro Tokyo^{[a]}; Anthony J. Resta^{[b]}; Bob St. John^{[b]}	3:53
2.	"Big Bang Generation"	Rhodes; Cuccurullo; Le Bon; Taylor		4:44
3.	"Electric Barbarella"			5:19
4.	"Out of My Mind"			4:20
5.	"Who Do You Think You Are?"			3:27
6.	"Silva Halo"			2:28
7.	"Be My Icon"			5:15
8.	"Buried in the Sand"		TV Mania; Syn Pro Tokyo^{[a]}; Resta^{[b]}; St. John^{[b]}	4:19
9.	"Michael You've Got a Lot to Answer For"			4:09
10.	"Midnight Sun"	Rhodes; Cuccurullo; Le Bon; Taylor		3:41
11.	"So Long Suicide"			4:39
12.	"Ball and Chain" (Japanese edition bonus track)	Rhodes; Cuccurullo; Le Bon; Taylor		3:58
13.	"Undergoing Treatment"		TV Mania; Syn Pro Tokyo^{[a]}; Resta^{[b]}; St. John^{[b]}	3:05
Total length:				53:17

Notes

- ^{^[a]} signifies an associate producer
- ^{^[b]} signifies an additional producer

Sample credits

- "Buried in the Sand" contains a sample of "Raga Jaijaiwanti" by Ustad Sultan Khan (courtesy of Navras Records)

== Personnel ==
=== Duran Duran ===
- Nick Rhodes – keyboards, spoken word (track 1), synth bass (track 13)
- Simon Le Bon – vocals (tracks 2 to 13)
- Warren Cuccurullo – guitar, bass (tracks 3 to 6, 8 to 10, and 12), synth bass (track 13), background vocals
- John Taylor – bass (tracks 1, 2, 7 and 11)

=== Additional musicians ===
- Steve Alexander – live drums (tracks 1, 2, 5, 7, and 10 to 12)
- Anthony J. Resta – live drums (tracks 2, 3, 5, 8 to 11, and 13), mixing (tracks 1 to 5 and 7 to 13), additional production (tracks 1, 8 and 13), additional rhythm and programming
- Dave DiCenso – live drums (track 4)
- Tim Garland – treated soprano sax solo (track 9)
- Talvin Singh – tabla and santoor (tracks 4)
- Jake Shapiro – cello (track 10)
- Ustad Sultan Khan – sarangi sample (track 8)
- Sally Stapleton – background vocals (track 2)
- Madeleine Farley – background vocals (track 6)
- Mayko Cuccurullo – ultra high vocal effects (track 1)
- Clem Burke – live drum fill (track 3)

=== Production ===
- TV Mania – mixing (track 6), production
- Syn Pro Tokyo – associate producer
- Mark Tinley – mixing (track 6), engineering and programming
- Ted Paddock – additional engineering at Metropolis Studios
- Bob St. John – mixing (tracks 1 to 5 and 7 to 13), mix engineering, additional production (tracks 1, 8 and 13)
- Gareth Ashton – mixing assistant
- Dave Collins – mastering at A&M Studios (tracks 1 to 11 and 13)
- Henk Kooistra – mastering at 9 West Mastering (track 12)
- Duran Duran – art direction
- Andrew Day – art direction, artwork, photography
- Ellen von Unwerth – photography
- Katrin Geilhausen – photography

== Charts ==
1997 chart performance for Medazzaland
Chart (1997)	Peak position
Canada Top Albums/CDs (RPM)	66
US Billboard 200	58

2022 chart performance for Medazzaland
Chart (2022)	Peak position
German Albums (Offizielle Top 100)	67
