= Pop Trash =

Studio album by Duran Duran
- Released: 19 June 2000
- Recorded: 1999–2000
- Genre: Pop rock; alternative rock; hard rock; heavy metal
- Length: 59:10
- Label: Hollywood
- Producer: TV Mania; Syn Productions

Duran Duran chronology
Strange Behaviour (1999)	Pop Trash (2000)	Singles Box Set 1981–1985 (2003)

Singles from Pop Trash
- 1. "Someone Else Not Me" Released: 13 March 2000; 2. "Playing with Uranium" Released: 20 October 2000 (Italy only); 3. "Last Day on Earth" Released: 7 March 2001 (Japan only)

Pop Trash is the tenth studio album by the English pop rock band Duran Duran. It was released on 19 June 2000 by Hollywood Records. Pop Trash was the band's first release after parting ways with EMI, with whom they had been signed since 1981. It was also the last to feature the trio of Simon Le Bon, Nick Rhodes and Warren Cuccurullo. The CD album went out of print in 2001.

== Release ==
It was the only album the band released under Hollywood Records. After the album's poor sales, Duran Duran's contract with the label was terminated, and they would not release an album until 2004's Astronaut. The album artwork, created by Andrew Day, features a rhinestone-encrusted car that belonged to Liberace.

From July 2008, the album was made available for sale digitally through the iTunes Store in the United States and Europe, along with Medazzaland. In 2021, the band signed a deal for the album with BMG (along with Medazzaland, Astronaut and Red Carpet Massacre) which saw it being re-issued in the UK on various digital platforms. A CD reissue was released on 17 August 2022.

== Critical reception ==
Professional ratings
Aggregate scores
Source	Rating
Metacritic	52/100
Review scores
Source	Rating
AllMusic	2/5 stars
The Encyclopedia of Popular Music	3/5 stars
Entertainment Weekly	C
HOB	3/5 stars
MTV	1/5 stars
Q	3/5 stars
Release Magazine	4/10
Rolling Stone	3/5 stars
The Rolling Stone Album Guide	2/5 stars
Salon	1/5 stars

Critics were generally unexcited by the album, which received an average score of 52, indicating "mixed or average" based on nine reviews, from Metacritic, which assigns a normalized rating out of 100 to reviews from mainstream publications. Rob Sheffield of Rolling Stone said:

The well-named Pop Trash shows off their jaded hooks and nasty wit; it's for fans only, but those of us who still crumple at the opening hiccups of "Hungry Like the Wolf" will be glad for another fix.

Stacia Proefrock of AllMusic said:

Some of the smooth, spacy ballads that were characteristic of their 1993 self-titled release show up here, but more often than not Le Bon is lost in a swamp of overproduction. Completely absent from this music was the aggressiveness and sexuality that made early Duran Duran great – kinder, gentler records could probably be expected from the band as they age, but this album feels careless and flabby instead of introspective.

Chris Willman of Entertainment Weekly said:

Let's give them the benefit of the doubt and say they didn't model Pop Trash after U2's Pop, but darn if Duran Duran aren't after a very similar juxtaposition of groove-based kitsch and super-sincerity. Not surprisingly, there are ephemeral confectionary delights [...] and a general witlessness, never more than when Simon LeBon keeps crooning "We'll all be famous for 15 minutes" as if he just thought of the idea.

A reviewer for Salon called Pop Trash "a mediocre Britpop album", while Q defended the album and said that "Pop Trash proves to be far from embarrassing". Another negative review came from MTV.com who said that "most of the album is, in fact, pop trash".

Ultimately, the album would become the band's lowest-selling album, and their last until 2004's Astronaut.

== Singles ==
The lead single "Someone Else Not Me" peaked only at #53 in the UK, and did not chart at all in United States. However, it made the top 10 in Latvia. Le Bon also recorded versions of this song in Spanish ("Alguien Que No Soy Yo") and French ("Un Autre Que Moi"). The music video for the single was the first to be created entirely in Macromedia Flash digital animation.

The song "Playing with Uranium" was supposed to be released as a single in Italy only, but was available only as a radio promo.

The song "Last Day on Earth" was released in Japan; it was also played during the opening of the Universal Studios Japan theme park in Osaka. Parts of the song were submitted for the James Bond movie Tomorrow Never Dies soundtrack, but were not chosen.

== Track listing ==
All songs written by Duran Duran

1. "Someone Else Not Me" – 4:48
2. "Lava Lamp" – 3:54
3. "Playing with Uranium" – 3:51
4. "Hallucinating Elvis" – 5:26
5. "Starting to Remember" – 2:38
6. "Pop Trash Movie" – 4:54
7. "Fragment" – 0:49
8. "Mars Meets Venus" – 3:07
9. "Lady Xanax" – 4:53
10. "The Sun Doesn't Shine Forever" – 4:51
11. "Kiss Goodbye" – 0:41
12. "Last Day on Earth" – 4:27

Bonus tracks on various international releases:

1. "Un Autre Que Moi" (French version of "Someone Else Not Me") – 4:19
2. "Alguien Que No Soy Yo" (Spanish version of "Someone Else Not Me") – 4:16
3. "Prototypes" – 6:17

== Personnel ==
Duran Duran

- Simon Le Bon – vocals
- Warren Cuccurullo – guitar and bass
- Nick Rhodes – keyboards

Additional musicians

- David Campbell – arranger (strings)
- Sally Boyden – backing vocals
- Ariane Sherine – piano (tracks 6, 10)
- John Tonks – drums, electric percussion
- Olivier Vieser – guitar
- Greg Bissonette – drums
- Steve Alexander – drums
- Luis Conte – percussion

Artwork and photography

- Andrew Day

== Charts ==
Chart (2000)	Peak position
German Albums (Offizielle Top 100)	80
Scottish Albums (OCC)	88
UK Albums (OCC)	53
UK Independent Albums (OCC)	9
US Billboard 200	135
