= Simon Le Bon =

English singer (born 1958)

Simon Le Bon MBE
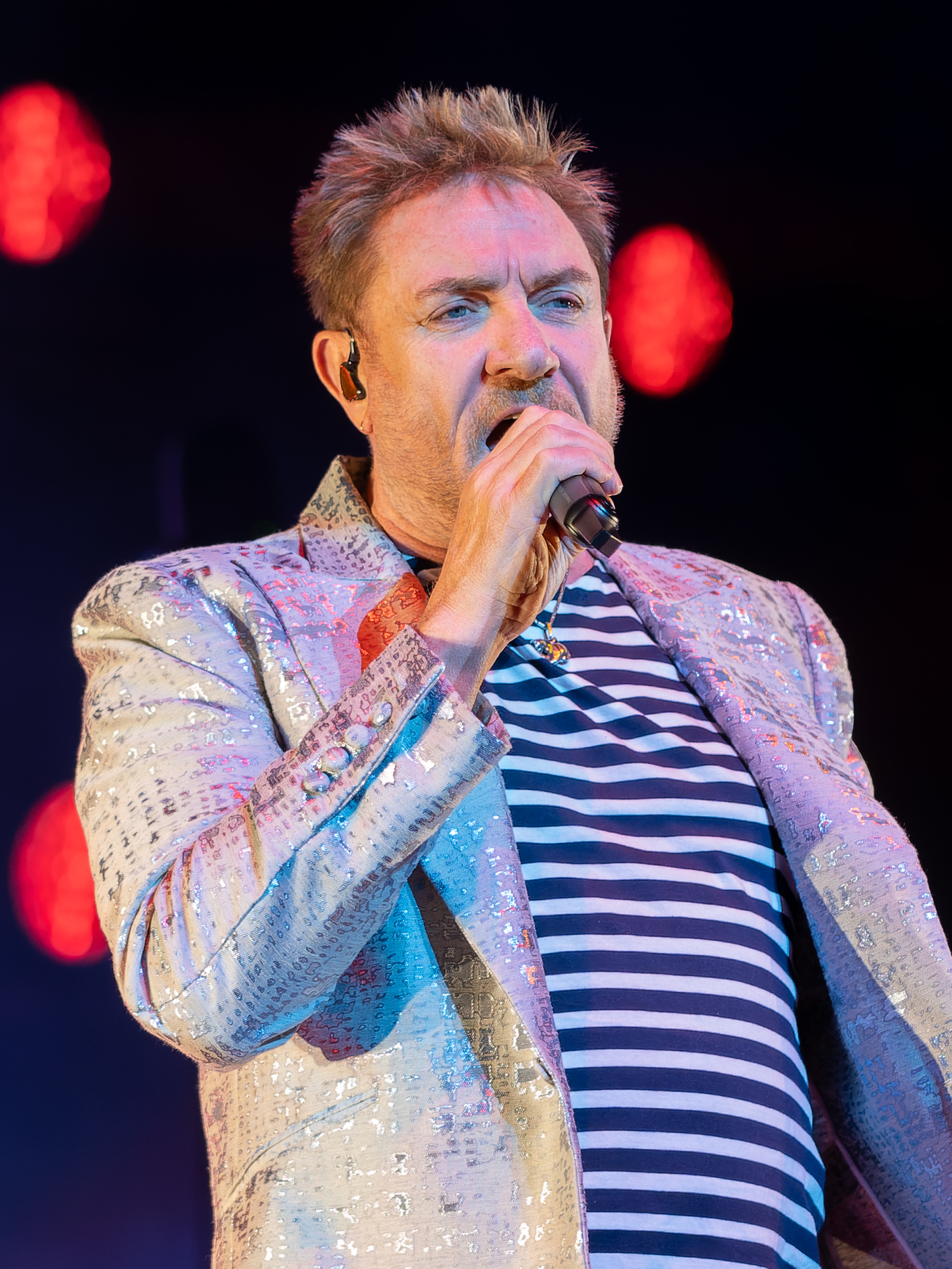
- Le Bon in 2023
- Born: Simon John Charles Le Bon; 27 October 1958 (age 67); Bushey, Hertfordshire, England
- Occupations: Singer; songwriter
- Spouse: Yasmin Parvaneh (m. 1985)
- Children: 3, including Amber Le Bon
- Musical career
- Genres: New wave; synth-pop; pop rock
- Years active: 1980–present
- Label: Various labels
- Member of: Duran Duran
- Formerly of: Arcadia

Simon John Charles Le Bon (born 27 October 1958) is an English singer. He is best known as the lead vocalist and lyricist of the new wave band Duran Duran and its offshoot Arcadia. Le Bon has received three Ivor Novello Awards from the British Academy of Songwriters, Composers and Authors, including the award for Outstanding Contribution to British Music. He received an MBE from Charles III in 2024.

== Early life ==
When he was six years old he was entered in a screen test for a Persil washing powder TV advertisement, which proved successful. He was a member of the local church choir from a young age, and was trained as an actor.

== Career ==
=== Before Duran Duran ===
Le Bon worked on a kibbutz—an Israeli collective community—in the Negev desert in Israel in 1978, and then returned to England to study drama at the University of Birmingham before meeting the fledgling band Duran Duran in 1980.

=== Duran Duran ===
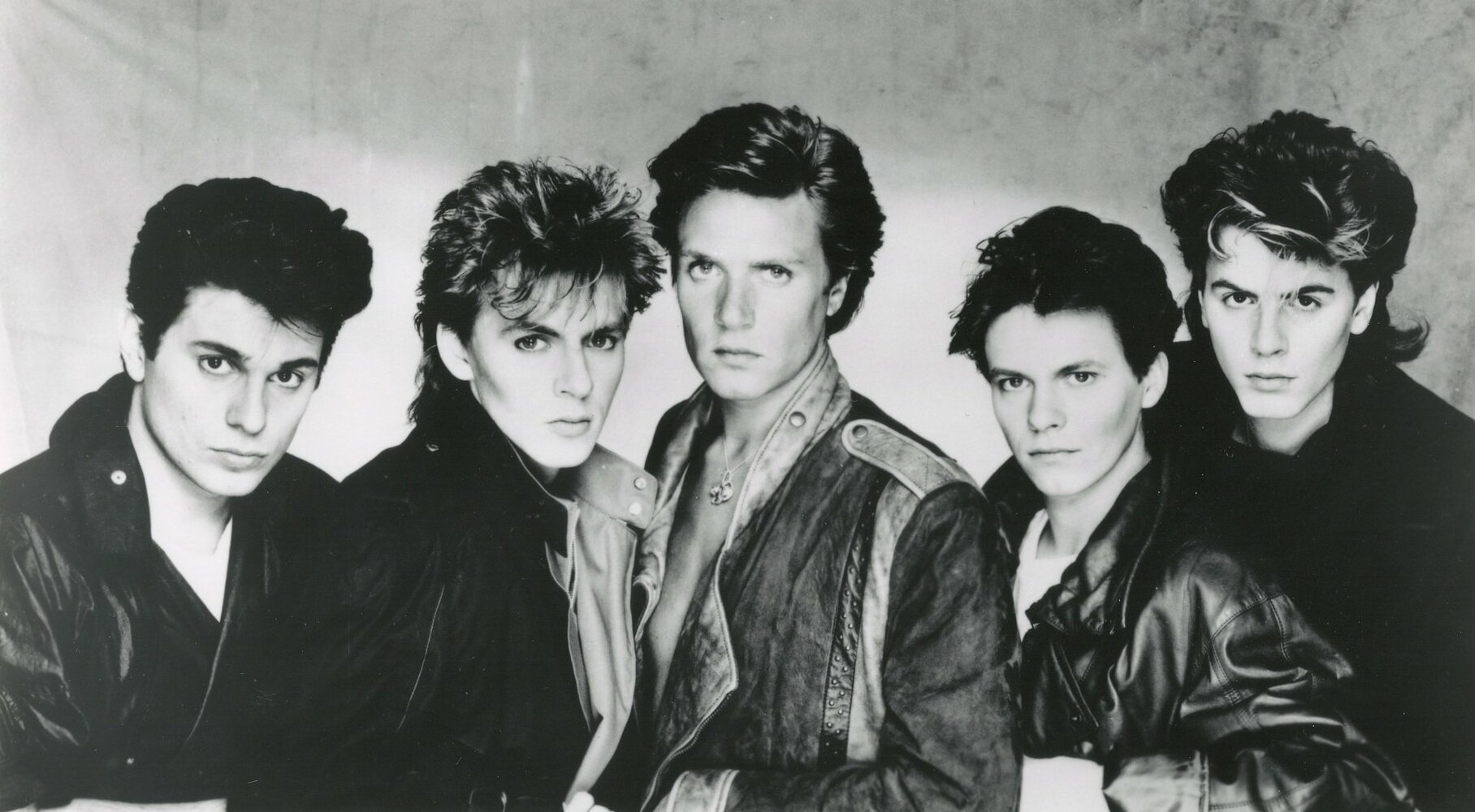
Le Bon (centre), with Duran Duran, 1983

Duran Duran was founded by childhood friends John Taylor and Nick Rhodes along with singer-songwriter Stephen Duffy in 1978, but Duffy left a year later, convinced that the band was not going to be successful. The band went through a long succession of line-up changes after Duffy's departure, but finally settled on a guitarist and drummer. The band had a powerful pop sound flavoured with disco, funk, and electronics, built on a solid rock rhythm section, and all they needed was a charismatic singer with a distinctive voice.

Le Bon's ex-girlfriend, Fiona Kemp (a bartender at the Rum Runner nightclub where Duran Duran were rehearsing), introduced him to the band in May 1980, recommending him as a potential lead vocalist. As band legend has it, he turned up for the audition wearing pink leopard-print trousers, and carrying a notebook containing a large collection of poems he had written—several of which would later become tracks on the early Duran Duran studio albums.

After listening to the songs the band had already composed together, Le Bon spent some time fitting one of his poems ("Sound of Thunder") to one of the instrumentals, and found they had a good match. Le Bon agreed to "try [Duran Duran] out for the summer"; within six weeks the band was playing steadily around Birmingham, London and Nottingham, and a national tour supporting Hazel O'Connor led to a recording contract with EMI Records in December that year.

The band's debut studio album, Duran Duran, was released in 1981, and they quickly became famous as part of the New Romantic movement. Three more albums followed in quick succession: Rio (1982), Seven and the Ragged Tiger (1983) and the live album Arena (1984). Each album release was accompanied by heavy media promotion and a lengthy concert tour. By mid-1984, the band were ready for a break. Duran Duran's only other work that year was an appearance on the Band Aid charity single "Do They Know It's Christmas?" which was recorded at Sarm West Studios in Notting Hill, London on 25 November 1984. Le Bon's vocal appears fourth on the song after Paul Young, Boy George and George Michael sing their lines.

Following the departures of Roger and Andy Taylor, Le Bon, Rhodes and John Taylor continued on as Duran Duran, recording and releasing Notorious (1986) and Big Thing (1988). The group added guitarist Warren Cuccurullo and drummer Sterling Campbell and recorded the studio album Liberty (1990), but the band's success had begun to wane in the late 1980s.

Duran Duran had a resurgence in popularity in 1993 with the Wedding Album, featuring the top-10 single "Ordinary World". Several months into the extensive worldwide concert tour supporting this album, Le Bon suffered a torn vocal cord, and the tour was postponed for six weeks while he recovered.

In 1995, Duran Duran released the covers album Thank You, and Le Bon had the chance to cover some of his favourite artists, (Jim Morrison, Lou Reed and Elvis Costello), but the album was severely panned by critics from all quarters. That year Le Bon also performed Duran Duran's 1993 hit "Ordinary World" with opera tenor Luciano Pavarotti during a "Children of Bosnia" benefit concert for War Child. Le Bon described the event to Jam! Showbiz thusly: "If you're talking about name dropping, he's one of the biggest names you could drop, Pav-The-Man".

When bassist John Taylor left the band in 1997, Le Bon and Rhodes remained as the only two members who had been with Duran Duran from the beginning of their recording career. The successive two studio albums with Le Bon, Rhodes and Cuccurullo—Medazzaland (1997) and Pop Trash (2000)—were not commercial successes.

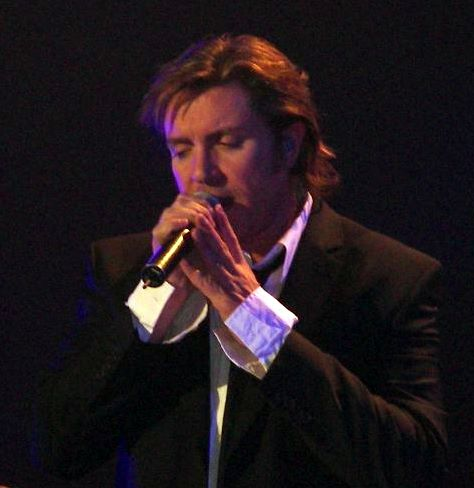
Le Bon performing live in 2005

In 2001, Duran Duran's original five members reunited to record a new studio album, Astronaut for Epic Records. Astronaut was released worldwide on 11 October 2004. The album was preceded by the single record "(Reach Up for The) Sunrise", their first UK Top 10 single in a decade.

=== Arcadia ===
Before Duran Duran reunited in 1986, Le Bon formed the band Arcadia with Rhodes. The band had a UK/US top 10 hit with their first single "Election Day", and released one studio album, So Red the Rose in 1985.

=== Solo excursions ===
While Le Bon has been in Duran Duran for the band's entire recording history, he has also dabbled in solo outings. In 1985, for the Whitbread Round the World Race, he contributed a song titled "Grey Lady of the Sea" and narrated a video of that year's race called Drum (1987). "Grey Lady of the Sea" was released as a single in Japan in 1988.

In 1989, for Jonathan Elias' Requiem for the Americas project, Le Bon contributed "Follow in My Footsteps", with the Bangles' Susanna Hoffs providing backing vocals. The track was released on 7" single in Italy that year.

In 1998, along with friend Nick Wood and wife Yasmin, he set up SYN Entertainment (Simon Yasmin Nick) in Tokyo, Japan. Having first conceived the idea in 1988, Le Bon is currently described as SYN's "Founder and Chairman", while Wood is "Founder, President and Creative Director".

In 2000, SYN Entertainment founded SYN Records which has released a number of compilations, some of which have included contributions by Le Bon. Another solo track, "Dreamboy", was featured on the SYN-released soundtrack to the Mario Van Peebles comedy film Love Kills (1998).

Also in 2000, SYN co-executive produced the Duran Duran studio album Pop Trash along with Rhodes' and Cuccurullo's side-venture TV Mania.

In October 2005 Dutch trance DJ Ferry Corsten released the track "Fire", with vocals by Le Bon. It was a remix of the lesser-known Duran Duran single "Serious", from the studio album Liberty (1990). In late 2006, Le Bon became a member of Shinzou Sound, and took part in the Japan-based online manga project, Synesthesia, by co-writing the theme song "Nobody Knows" along with Nick Wood.

In 2010, Le Bon collaborated on the song "Record Collection", the title track from Mark Ronson's third studio album. In the song, Le Bon is heard singing the chorus, along with Mark Ronson and hip-hop artist Wiley. Ronson later produced Duran Duran's 2010 studio album All You Need Is Now, and 2015's Paper Gods.

Since 2020, he has been hosting the music show WHOOOSH! with Katy Krassner. Originally on the Duran Duran website, the show moved to Spotify and then to SiriusXM where it airs on The Spectrum channel 28. The duo play 11 songs per week and discuss them. Le Bon curates all the tracks.

In 2024, LeBon appeared as a guest judge on season 6 of RuPaul's Drag Race UK. The lip-sync song chosen for the episode was "Girls on Film".

== Personal life ==
In the early 1980s, Le Bon was engaged to his then-longtime girlfriend, model-turned-actress Claire Stansfield. After breaking up with her, he dated fashion model Yasmin Parvaneh. Seeing her face in a magazine, he phoned her modelling agency to track her down and they married on 27 December 1985. Yasmin suffered two miscarriages, but the couple went on to have three daughters, including Amber.

During Duran Duran's hiatus in 1985, Le Bon drew media attention when his maxi yacht, Drum, lost its keel and capsized during the Fastnet Race, just off Falmouth along the southern coast of Cornwall. Before being rescued, Le Bon and other crew members were trapped under the boat, inside the hull, for forty minutes. All of them were rescued by the Royal Navy, using a search and rescue (SAR) helicopter from 771 Naval Air Squadron based near Helston. The rescue earned the Rescue Diver, POACMN L Slater, a George Medal. Despite the accident, Le Bon and Drum went on to participate in the 1985–1986 Whitbread Round the World Race, coming in third overall in elapsed time. Le Bon and his partners eventually sold Drum; the events surrounding Drum and the races were chronicled in a 1989 movie entitled Drum – The Journey of a Lifetime and the book One Watch at a Time written by Drum's skipper, Skip Novak.

Twenty years after his accident, in 2005, Le Bon made public his desire to race again. During a touring break in August 2005, Le Bon again raced Drum in the Fastnet Race, borrowing the vessel from her owner (the late Scottish multi car garage owner Sir Arnold Clark) to participate, and raising funds for charity the Royal National Lifeboat Institution (RNLI). Le Bon had to leave the race unfinished, as light winds were slowing Drum (and the other competitors), and would have delayed the boat's arrival at Plymouth, interfering with Le Bon's obligation to perform in Japan. He appears as the narrator in a documentary film project called The Weekend Sailor which is about a Swan 65 sailing yacht called Sayula II that won the first Whitbread Round the World sailing race in 1973–1974.

In 2009 Le Bon (who describes himself as a "concerned agnostic") contributed an essay to the book The Atheist's Guide to Christmas, edited by Ariane Sherine. In 2014, he became a distinguished supporter of Humanists UK.

Le Bon injured his vocal cords and was unable to finish his 2011 summer tour. He remarked, "I am trying to be philosophical."

In 2018, Le Bon was accused by a therapist named Shereen Hariri of sexually assaulting her at the Wherehouse, a record store where she worked during a signing session on 10 April 1995. He responded via the band's social media pages denying the allegation, saying in part, "I have always been one who can admit to my mistakes and apologize for my failings. But I cannot apologize for something I did not do."

Le Bon was appointed Member of the Order of the British Empire (MBE) in the 2024 Birthday Honours for services to music and charity.

== Discography ==
with Duran Duran

- Duran Duran (1981)
- Rio (1982)
- Seven and the Ragged Tiger (1983)
- Notorious (1986)
- Big Thing (1988)
- Liberty (1990)
- Duran Duran (1993)
- Thank You (1995)
- Medazzaland (1997)
- Pop Trash (2000)
- Astronaut (2004)
- Reportage (2006; unreleased)
- Red Carpet Massacre (2007)
- All You Need Is Now (2010)
- Paper Gods (2015)
- Future Past (2021)
- Danse Macabre (2023)

with Arcadia

- So Red the Rose (1985)
