= Love Voodoo =

- Lyric page for the song in the album's liner notes

Song by Duran Duran

from the album Duran Duran
- Released: 15 February 1993
- Studio: Privacy (Battersea); Maison Rouge (London)
- Length: 4:58
- Label: Parlophone
- Songwriter: Duran Duran
- Producers: Duran Duran; John Jones

Audio video
- "Love Voodoo" on YouTube

"Love Voodoo" is a song by the English pop rock band Duran Duran, released on their seventh studio album Duran Duran (1993), commonly known as The Wedding Album. Written during sessions at Privacy Studios in Battersea that began in January 1991, the track was completed by July of that year. Critics have described "Love Voodoo" as incorporating elements of electro, dub, glam-soul, and funk rock, and some compared it to the music of the Beatles and George Michael. Reviewers also noted its slinky rhythm and seductive melody, highlighting features such as a "stalking" bass line, keyboard "flourishes", an acoustic guitar passage, and a descending chord progression in the verses. Lyrically, the song has been described by the keyboardist Nick Rhodes as "a twisted love story", delivered with phased vocals and a pronounced rhyme scheme.

Upon release, "Love Voodoo" received generally positive attention from contemporary critics. The song has continued to be well regarded in retrospective assessments, with it being called one of Duran Duran's best songs. The band later revisited the track for their sixteenth studio album Danse Macabre (2023), releasing a re-recorded version titled "Love Voudou".

== Background and composition ==
In January 1991, Duran Duran began work on their seventh studio album Duran Duran (1993) at Privacy Studios in Battersea, London. "Love Voodoo" and several other songs were composed by July 1991, with the keyboardist Nick Rhodes noting his enthusiasm for "Love Voodoo", saying, "I love that one. Warren's guitar parts are impeccable. At the time we wrote it, we certainly thought we were onto something. It's a killer chorus."

Commentators identified a range of stylistic elements in "Love Voodoo". Annie Zaleski of Ultimate Classic Rock called it "a sleek, languid electro seduction", while Sam Wood of The Philadelphia Inquirer described it as moving "into the netherworld of glittery heavy dub". Simon Ashberry of the Telegraph & Argus referred to the track as a "spooky glam-soul number", and Mark Elliott of Dig! wrote that it carries "a masculine funk-rock edge". Marty Hughley of The Oregonian added that the song is "simmering Afro-Latin-tinged". Critics offered several stylistic comparisons for "Love Voodoo". Alan Jones of Music Week described the song as Beatlesque, while Larry Printz of The Morning Call wrote that it "recalls George Michael". In contrast, John Armstrong of the Vancouver Sun, in his review of Duran Duran, remarked that "too much of the album sounds like … Duran Duran", citing the phased vocals on "Love Voodoo" as an example.

…the chiming, atmospheric playing on 'Love Voodoo' is almost as darkly evocative as the James Bond-meets-post-punk guitar line on 'Come Undone'.

— Steve Malins, 2013

Critics described "Love Voodoo" as having a slinky rhythm and a seductive melody. The author Steve Malins in his book Duran Duran: Wild Boys called it a "dusky, moody grower". The song features a "stalking" bass line, keyboard "flourishes", and a descending chord progression in the verses. Paul Sinclair of SuperDeluxeEdition also noted that the track "benefits from a lovely sparing acoustic guitar figure at 1.39", describing this lighter approach as serving the song well. Commenting on the vocal approach, Sinclair wrote that the singer Simon Le Bon "seemed to get his singing tone just right" on the track, avoiding the "shouty, rocky edge" that had characterised parts of their previous studio album Liberty (1990). Lyrically, Rhodes described "Love Voodoo" as "a twisted love story", noting that it carries "a bit of the Kiss of the Spider Woman" in its narrative. The song also features a pronounced rhyme scheme.

== Reception and legacy ==
Upon Duran Duran's release, "Love Voodoo" received generally positive attention from critics. Sam Short of the Record Searchlight described it as "impressive", while Chuck Campbell of the Scripps Howard News Service highlighted its "ornately textured" sound. Nigel Tilson of The Impartial Reporter wrote that the song "has some nice qualities without really catching fire". Mario Tarradell of the Miami Herald grouped it with other strong moments at the start of the album, and Ashberry noted that tracks like "Love Voodoo" made the record "well worth the effort".

"Love Voodoo" continues to be well received, with Rik Flynn of Classic Pop ranking it at 29th in his "40 of the best Duran Duran songs – year by year" list. Chris Gerard of Metro Weekly called it one of the many "great tunes" on Duran Duran, while Sinclair wrote that there is "So much to enjoy from Duran Duran's 'comeback' album, The Wedding Album, including this album track". Sinclair highlighted "Le Bon's "wonderful melody", and a "very strong chorus", concluding that "it just sounds so good". Duran Duran later revisited the track in 2023 for their sixteenth studio album Danse Macabre (2023), releasing a re-recorded version titled "Love Voudou".

== Personnel ==
Duran Duran

- Simon Le Bon – vocals
- Warren Cuccurullo – acoustic guitar
- Nick Rhodes – keyboards
- John Taylor – bass guitar

Additional musicians

- John Jones – programming, engineer, keyboards, drums
- Lamya – backing vocals

Production

- Duran Duran – production
- John Jones – production, engineering, sub-mixing
- David Richards – mixing
- Kevin Metcalfe – mastering
