= NOTA (disambiguation) =

Nota or NOTA may refer to:

== Music ==
- Nóta, a form of 19th century Hungarian popular song
- Lai (poetic form) or nota, a medieval musical form
- Nota (group), a Puerto Rican vocal group

== NOTA ==
- None of the above, a ballot choice in some jurisdictions or organizations
  - None of the above (disambiguation), other uses
- Network on Terminal Architecture, a mobile technology system architecture
- NAP of the Americas, a large data center and Internet exchange point in Miami, Florida
- National Organ Transplant Act of 1984, American legislation

== People ==
- Antonella Nota, Italian astronomer
- Július Nôta (1971–2009), Slovak footballer
- Marc Nota (born 1965), Dutch former cricketer and coach
- Nota Schiller (1937–2025), Orthodox Jewish rabbi and rosh yeshiva

== Other uses ==
- Nota, an Australian automobile manufacturer
- Note (film), 2015 Malaysian Film often known as NOTA in Malay language
- NOTA (film), a 2018 Tamil film
- Nota (library), Danish library for people with print disabilities
- 1,4,7-triazacyclononane-N,N′,N″-triacetic acid (NOTA), an aminopolycarboxylic acid

== See also ==
- Notah Begay III (born 1972), American golfer
