= Thank You (Duran Duran album) =

Studio album by Duran Duran
- Released: 27 March 1995
- Recorded: 1992–1994
- Genres: Alternative rock; pop rock
- Length: 54:26
- Label: Parlophone
- Producers: Duran Duran; John Jones

Duran Duran chronology
Duran Duran (1993)	Thank You (1995)	Medazzaland (1997)

Singles from Thank You
- 1. "Perfect Day" Released: 13 March 1995; 2. "White Lines (Don't Do It)" Released: 5 June 1995

Thank You is the eighth studio album by the English pop rock band Duran Duran. It was released on 27 March 1995 by Parlophone. Consisting primarily of cover versions, the album performed moderately on the charts, reaching number 12 on the UK Albums Chart and number 19 on the US Billboard 200, but received negative reviews from critics.

The title track, "Thank You" (originally by Led Zeppelin), first appeared in an edited form (5:06) on the soundtrack to the 1994 film With Honors. A still shorter edit (4:32) later appeared on Encomium: A Tribute to Led Zeppelin, a month before the full version was included on this album.

== Critical reception ==
Professional ratings
Review scores
Source	Rating
AllMusic	1.5/5 stars
The Encyclopedia of Popular Music	2/5 stars
Entertainment Weekly	C
Rolling Stone	2.5/5 stars
The Rolling Stone Album Guide	2/5 stars
Select	1/5 medals
Spin	2/10

The two singles from the album were covers of Grandmaster Melle Mel's "White Lines (Don't Don't Do It)" and Lou Reed's "Perfect Day". "Lay Lady Lay" was a single in Italy and in Spain.

J. D. Considine of Rolling Stone said "some of the ideas at play here are stunningly wrongheaded, like the easy-listening arrangement given Elvis Costello's 'Watching the Detectives' or the version of Zeppelin's 'Thank You' that sounds like the band is covering Chris de Burgh. But it takes a certain demented genius to recognize Iggy Pop's 'Success' as the Gary Glitter tune it was meant to be or to redo '911 Is a Joke' so it sounds more like Beck than like Public Enemy."

In 2006, the album was declared the worst album of all time by Q magazine.

"Perfect Day" was the first single from Thank You and became a moderate hit, peaking at number 28 on the UK Singles Chart. In the US, the song narrowly failed to crack the Billboard Hot 100, only "bubbling under" as high as number 101 from 24 June to 8 July 1995. The B-side of the single was a version of the Velvet Underground's song "Femme Fatale", previously available in 1993, on Duran Duran's Wedding Album.

Lou Reed said on the electronic press kit that accompanied Duran Duran's version of "Perfect Day" was "the best cover ever completed of one of my own songs".

== Reissue ==
On 10 April 2026, Thank You and the band's previous album Duran Duran were reissued for the first time since their original releases. The new releases, through Warner Records, are available on double LP and CD formats and feature no bonus tracks.

== Track listing ==
Thank You track listing
No.	Title	Writer(s)	Original artist	Length
1.	"White Lines"	Melvin Glover; Sylvia Robinson	Melle Mel	5:31
2.	"I Wanna Take You Higher"	Sylvester Stewart	Sly and the Family Stone	5:06
3.	"Perfect Day"	Lou Reed	Lou Reed	3:51
4.	"Watching the Detectives"	Elvis Costello	Elvis Costello	4:48
5.	"Lay Lady Lay"	Bob Dylan	Bob Dylan	3:53
6.	"911 Is a Joke"	William Jonathan Drayton Jr.; Keith Shocklee; Eric Sadler	Public Enemy	3:59
7.	"Success"	David Bowie; Ricky Gardiner	Iggy Pop	4:05
8.	"Crystal Ship"	The Doors	The Doors	2:52
9.	"Ball of Confusion"	Norman Whitfield; Barrett Strong	The Temptations	3:46
10.	"Thank You"	Jimmy Page; Robert Plant	Led Zeppelin	6:36
11.	"Drive By"	Simon Le Bon; Warren Cuccurullo; Nick Rhodes; John Taylor	Duran Duran	5:34
12.	"I Wanna Take You Higher Again"	Sylvester Stewart	Sly and the Family Stone	4:25
Total length:				54:26

Bonus tracks on Japanese release
No.	Title	Writer(s)	Original artist	Length
13.	"Diamond Dogs"	David Bowie	David Bowie	6:10
14.	"Femme Fatale"	Lou Reed	The Velvet Underground and Nico	4:22
Total length:				64:58

Perfect Day UK single disc 1
No.	Title	Writer(s)	Original artist	Length
1.	"The Needle and the Damage Done"	Neil Young	Neil Young	2:06

== Personnel ==
Duran Duran

- Warren Cuccurullo – guitar, production
- Simon Le Bon – vocals, production
- Nick Rhodes – keyboards, production
- John Taylor – bass guitar, production

Additional musicians

- Roger Taylor – drums on "Perfect Day" and "Watching the Detectives"
- Steve Ferrone – drums on "White Lines" and "Crystal Ship"
- Tony Thompson – drums on "I Wanna Take You Higher"
- Anthony J. Resta – drums on "White Lines", "Lay Lady Lay", "911 Is a Joke", "Ball of Confusion" and "I Wanna Take You Higher Again"
- Terry Bozzio – drums on "Success", "Thank You" and "Drive By"
- Abe Laboriel Jr. – drums on "Lay Lady Lay" and "I Wanna Take You Higher Again"
- John Jones – additional keyboards, guitars, and vocals
- Jonathan Elias – Moog synthesizer on "Crystal Ship"
- Bruce Dukov – violin
- Henry Ferber – violin strings
- Ron Folsom – violin strings
- Armen Garabedian – violin strings
- Berj Garabedian – violin strings
- Michelle Kikuchi-Richards – violin strings
- Joy Lyle – violin strings
- Maria Newman – violin strings
- Pamela Goldsmith – viola
- Scott Haupert – viola
- Suzi Katayama – cello
- Lee Oskar – harmonica on "Watching the Detectives" and "I Wanna Take You Higher"
- Flo & Eddie – background vocals on "Success"
- Grandmaster Flash & the Furious Five – background vocals on "White Lines" and "I Wanna Take You Higher"
- Grandmaster Melle Mel – background vocals, rapping on "White Lines"
- Curtis King – background vocals on "I Wanna Take You Higher"
- Lamya – background vocals on "White Lines" "I Wanna Take You Higher" and "Drive By"
- Maxanne Lewis – background vocals on "Ball of Confusion"
- Tessa Niles – background vocals on "Perfect Day" and "Watching the Detectives"

Technical

- John Jones – producing, audio engineering, mixing, programming
- Anthony J. Resta – production, engineering, mixing, programming
- Steve Churchyard – engineering
- Avril McCintosh – engineering
- Ken Scott – engineering
- Tony Taverner – engineering
- Jason Corsaro – mixing
- David Richards – mixing
- Tim Palmer – mixing
- Bob St. John – mixing, production
- Mark Tinley – programming
- Tim Young – mastering

== Charts ==
Chart performance for Thank You
Chart (1995)	Peak position
Australian Albums (ARIA)	63
Austrian Albums (Ö3 Austria)	25
Belgian Albums (Ultratop Flanders)	34
Belgian Albums (Ultratop Wallonia)	16
Canada Top Albums/CDs (RPM)	15
Dutch Albums (Album Top 100)	34
European Albums (Music & Media)	36
German Albums (Offizielle Top 100)	50
Hungarian Albums (MAHASZ)	30
Italian Albums (Musica e dischi)	17
Japanese Albums (Oricon)	27
Swiss Albums (Schweizer Hitparade)	44
UK Albums (Official Charts)	12
US Billboard 200	19

Chart (2026)	Peak position
Croatian International Albums (HDU)	22

== Certifications ==
Certifications for Thank You
Region	Certification	Certified units/sales
Canada (Music Canada)	Gold	50,000^{^}
United States (RIAA)	Gold	500,000^{^}
^{^} Shipments figures based on certification alone.
