= Sin of the City =

- Lyric page for the song in the album's liner notes

Song by Duran Duran

from the album Duran Duran
- Released: 15 February 1993
- Studio: Privacy (Battersea); Maison Rouge (London)
- Length: 7:14
- Label: Parlophone
- Songwriter: Duran Duran
- Lyricist: John Taylor
- Producers: Duran Duran; John Jones

Audio video
- "Sin of the City" on YouTube

"Sin of the City" is a song by the English pop rock band Duran Duran from their seventh studio album, Duran Duran (1993), commonly known as The Wedding Album. It was composed in mid-1991 during sessions at Privacy Studios in Battersea, London. Upon release, the song received mostly negative reviews, though retrospective commentary has been more measured.

"Sin of the City" features lyrics by the bassist John Taylor about the 1990 Happy Land fire. A departure from the band's earlier lyricism, it has been described as a social statement addressing themes of urban corruption and human moral failure. Musically, "Sin of the City" runs over seven minutes and concludes with an extended jam section. It includes "speaky" vocal passages and elements of rapping by the singer Simon Le Bon.

== Background and recording ==
In January 1991, Duran Duran began work on their seventh studio album Duran Duran (1993) at Privacy Studios in Battersea, London. "Sin of the City" and several other songs were composed by July 1991, with the co-producer John Jones recalling that it was a track the band "put a lot of work into", describing it as one he had "always loved".

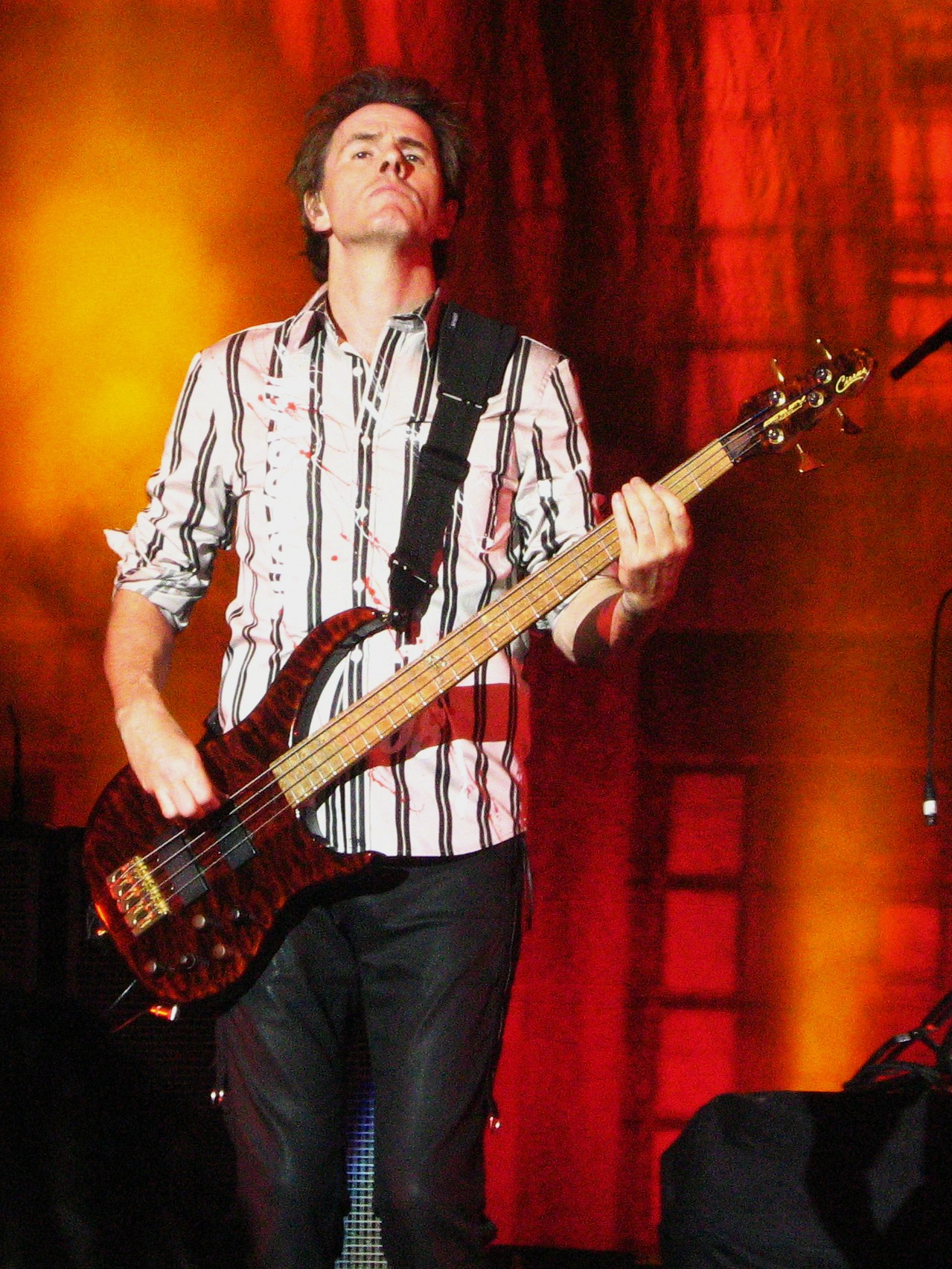
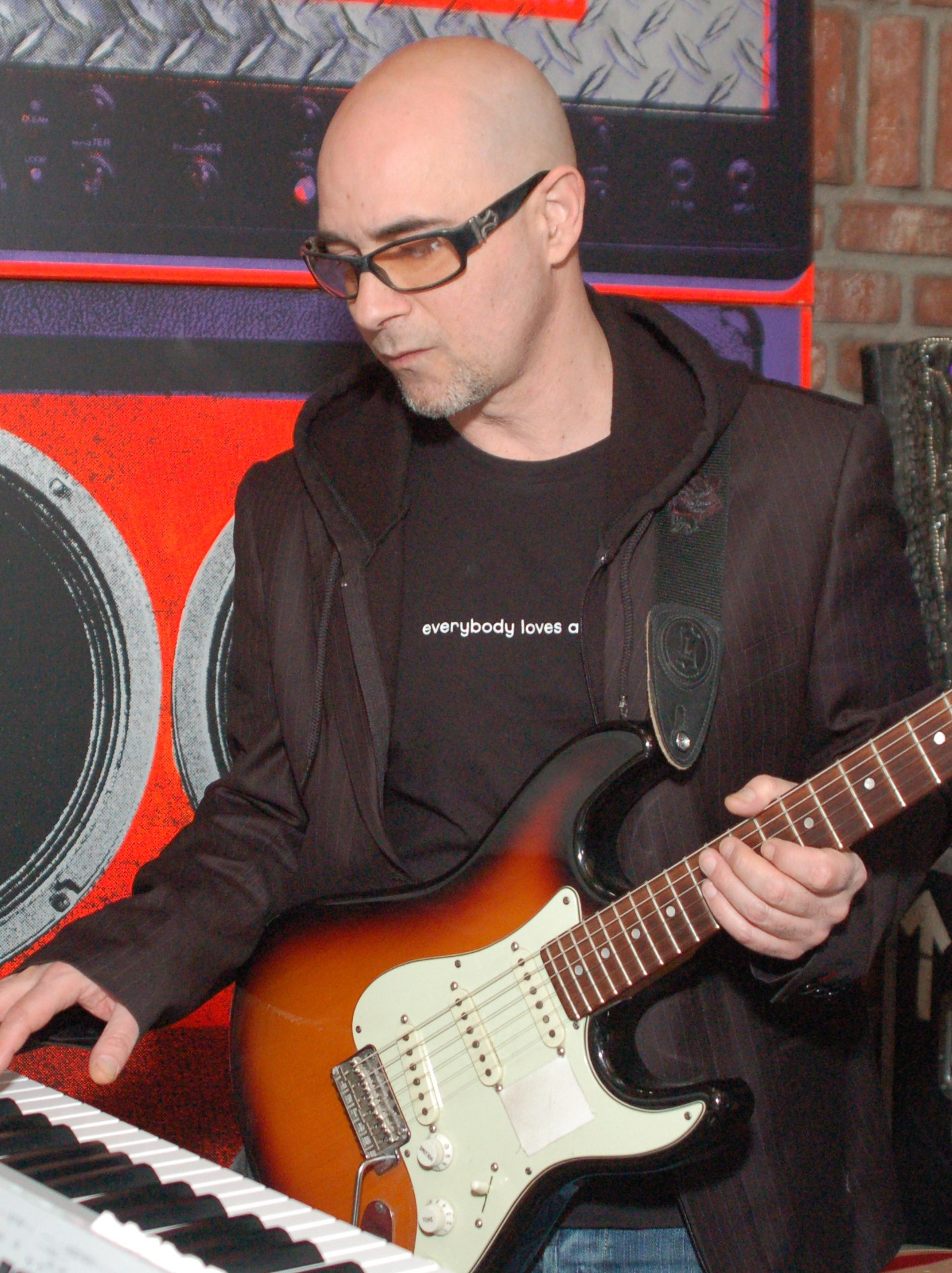
John Taylor (left, in 2008) and Warren Cuccurullo (right, in 2009), whose improvised performance during recording produced the song's extended jam ending.

According to Richard Buskin of Recording Musician, the song's ending developed spontaneously during recording. The final few minutes consist of what Buskin called a "free-for-all jam session". The bassist John Taylor explained that while he and the guitarist Warren Cuccurullo were playing, "the drum machine program kind of slipped out of gear", prompting them to start "playing in a different key". As the session progressed, they "jammed a little bit, stopped playing, put down [their] instruments one by one, and then the drum program ran out". Upon playback, the band decided to keep the entire take and "mixed it all the way to the end", which the singer Simon Le Bon described as one of the many "rough things" the band chose to leave on the album rather than re-record.

== Composition ==
"Sin of the City"
"Sin of the City" features lyrics by Taylor about the 1990 Happy Land fire, delivered by Le Bon in what Sinclair described as "speaky" vocals, with Curtin noting "some half-hearted rapping".

"Sin of the City" features lyrics by Taylor about the 1990 Happy Land fire, which killed eighty-seven people. (Note: While the actual number of victims was eighty-seven, the lyrics to "Sin of the City" state eighty-nine people died in the Happy Land fire.) Critics noted that the song marked a departure from Duran Duran's earlier, more abstract lyricism; Sam Wood of The Philadelphia Inquirer observed that instead of the "strings of ridiculous non sequiturs" found in songs like "The Reflex", the band expressed "moral indignation at slumlords", while Robbie Daw of Idolator described the song's "grim subject matter" as unlike the band's typical 1980s fare, adding that it "was calling out the whole human race for at least not owning up to its innate dark side". "Sin of the City" was identified by Scott Spence of the Tri-City Herald as one of several tracks on Duran Duran that function as "social statements, hyping the woes of society", while Ursula Fahy of the Staten Island Advance wrote that the song "relays a message concerning the corruption of our society".

Chuck Campbell writing for the Scripps Howard News Service described the song as having a "pulsating treatment", which he called an "unfortunately flip technique for the song's tragic theme about a nightclub fire". Daw noted that its "funky, Prince-esque" arrangement and "dizzying orgy of guitars" accompany Le Bon's account of the Happy Land fire, calling the guitar work by Taylor and Cuccurullo "relentless" and "astonishing". Mark Elliott of Dig! noted that it contains a "compulsive vocal hook" and, at more than seven minutes, serves as a "lengthy end to an otherwise tight work". Paul Sinclair of SuperDeluxeEdition observed that Le Bon "reverts to his 'speaky' vocals for the verses", while Mike Curtin of The Post-Star described the performance as including "some half-hearted rapping". Additionally, voices from Korean fans of the band who came to London to could be heard.

== Reception and legacy ==
Reception to "Sin of the City" was largely negative. Tony Fletcher of Newsday criticised the song's subject matter, questioning "whether the world really need[s]… well-off pop stars to show their concern for everyday people by singing about the Happyland fire of 1990", describing Duran Duran's approach as "heavy-handed". Ed Bumgardner of the Winston-Salem Journal similarly dismissed the track, calling the band's attempts at social observation "superficial and unconvincing". Mario Tarradell of the Miami Herald grouped "Sin of the City" with the album's closing tracks, describing them as "drowning in messy electronic gadgets". He called the songs "the epitome of awful", characterising them as "excruciatingly long, badly written and atrociously sung". Simon Ashberry of the Telegraph & Argus also viewed the song unfavourably, referring to it as "an unsuccessful semi-foray into the territory of rap".

Later assessments offered more measured views. The author Steve Malins in his book Wild Boys described the song as an "epic closer" with "an intensity that is lacking in the album's weaker songs". Sinclair acknowledged that "only 'Sin of the City' has any kind of emotional centre", retelling the story of a tragedy, though he still found that "it's not great and drags on for ages".

== Personnel ==
Duran Duran

- Simon Le Bon – vocals
- Warren Cuccurullo – electric guitar
- Nick Rhodes – keyboards
- John Taylor – bass guitar

Additional musicians

- John Jones – programming, engineer, keyboards, drums

Production

- Duran Duran – production
- John Jones – production, engineering, sub-mixing
- David Richards – mixing
- Kevin Metcalfe – mastering
