= None of the above (disambiguation) =

None of the above is an option on some ballots that allows voters the opportunity to express disapproval of all candidates.

None of the above may also refer to:

== Politics ==
=== Parties and organizations ===
- None of the Above Direct Democracy Party, a minor provincial political party in Ontario, Canada
- NOTA Party, a political party in the UK
- NOTA UK, a political organization in the UK

=== Politicians ===
- None Of The Above X (born 1958), name used by the boxer Terry Marsh as a candidate in South Basildon and East Thurrock in the 2010 UK General Election
- Zero, None Of The Above, a candidate in Filton and Bradley Stoke in the 2010 UK General Election
- Above Znoneofthe (born 1969), a candidate in the 1993 Canadian federal election

=== Voting options ===
- None of the above (India), a voting option in India
- None of these candidates, an implementation of None of the above in the US State of Nevada

== Arts and entertainment ==
- None of the Above (novel), by I. W. Gregorio, 2015
- None of the Above renamed Street Genius, a National Geographic Channel popular science show, 2013–2014
- "None of the Above" (Dawson's Creek), a 1999 television episode
- Because I Love It, an album by Amerie, originally planned to be titled None of the Above
- None of the Above (album), a 2000 album by Peter Hammill
- "None of the Above" (song), a song by Duran Duran from Duran Duran, 1993
- "None of the Above", a song by Papa Roach from Crooked Teeth, 2017

== See also ==
- NOTA (disambiguation)
