= Femme Fatale (song) =

Song by The Velvet Underground

- Single b/w "Sunday Morning"

Single by The Velvet Underground and Nico

from the album The Velvet Underground & Nico
- A-side: "Sunday Morning"
- Released: December 1966 (single); March 1967 (album)
- Recorded: April 1966
- Studio: Scepter, New York City
- Genre: Pop; doo wop
- Length: 2:35
- Label: Verve
- Songwriter: Lou Reed
- Producer: Andy Warhol

The Velvet Underground and Nico singles chronology
"All Tomorrow's Parties" / "I'll Be Your Mirror" (1966)	"Femme Fatale" / "Sunday Morning" (1966)	"White Light/White Heat" / "Here She Comes Now" (1968)

"Femme Fatale" is a song by American rock band the Velvet Underground from their debut studio album The Velvet Underground & Nico (1967), with lead vocals by German singer Nico.

== Background ==
The song was composed in the key of C major. At the request of Andy Warhol, band frontman Lou Reed wrote the song about Warhol superstar Edie Sedgwick. According to Reed, the title was inspired by Warhol saying, about Sedgwick, "Oh, don't you think she's a femme fatale, Lou?"

The song was recorded with vocals by Nico. Guitarist Sterling Morrison said of the title:

[Nico] always hated that. Nico, whose native language is minority French, would say "The name of this song is 'Fahm Fatahl'." Lou and I would sing it our way. Nico hated that. I said, "Nico, hey, it's my title, I'll pronounce it my way".

"Femme Fatale" was recorded at the Scepter Studios in New York in April 1966 while the studio was still under construction. It was released as a B-Side to "Sunday Morning" in December 1966. The following year it was included in their debut album The Velvet Underground & Nico. A 1969 live recording of the song was included in Bootleg Series Volume 1: The Quine Tapes released in 2001.

== Critical reception ==
AllMusic critic Mark Deming thought that "Femme Fatale" was among the four best songs on the album. American music journalist Stephen Davis called "Femme Fatale" a beautiful song that portrays the vivid, conflicted and emotional undercurrents of 1966.

== Personnel ==
- Nico – lead vocals
- Lou Reed – lead guitar, backing vocals
- John Cale – piano, bass
- Sterling Morrison – rhythm guitar, backing vocals
- Maureen Tucker – snare drum, tambourine

== Duran Duran version ==
"Femme Fatale"
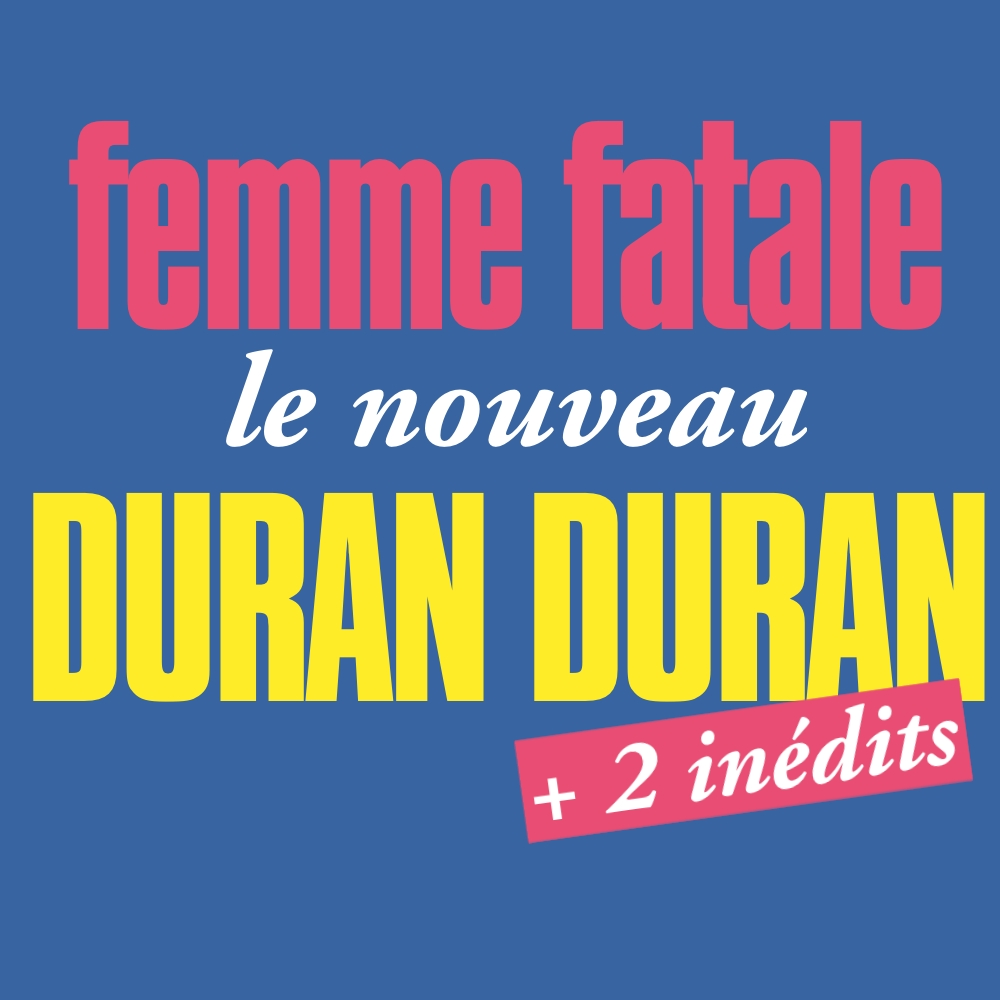
- Cover for the 1993 French single release

Song by Duran Duran

from the album Duran Duran
- Released: 15 February 1993
- Recorded: 1992
- Studio: Privacy (Battersea); Maison Rouge (London)
- Genre: Stadium rock
- Length: 4:21
- Label: Parlophone
- Songwriter: Lou Reed
- Producers: Duran Duran; John Jones

Music video
- "Femme Fatale" on YouTube

"Femme Fatale" was covered by the English pop rock band Duran Duran for their seventh studio album, Duran Duran (1993), commonly known as The Wedding Album. Suggested by the guitarist Warren Cuccurullo's friend Frank Zappa, the recording has been described in varying terms, from "grand" and "atmospheric" to stadium rock and "dreamy". Although Capitol Records planned to release it as a single with an accompanying video directed by Ellen von Unwerth, the idea was abandoned after the preceding single "Too Much Information" underperformed, and was instead issued as a single in France in 1993. The cover was met with negative critical reception, with reviewers characterizing it as misjudged, unnecessary, and poorly executed.

=== Background and composition ===
Duran Duran recorded a cover of the Velvet Underground's "Femme Fatale" in 1992, which, according to the author Steve Malins, was suggested by the guitarist Warren Cuccurullo's friend Frank Zappa. Their version has been described in a number of ways: Malins referred to it as a "grand, echoey version" and an "intriguingly atmospheric treatment", noting that it relocated the song's mood "from the icy, street hassle of New York into LA's glimmering Californian sunshine". Stuart Maconie of Q described the cover as a stadium rock interpretation, while Annie Zaleski of Ultimate Classic Rock highlighted its "dreamy" qualities, writing that it added introspection to their seventh studio album Duran Duran (1993).

=== Release and reception ===
Following the release of "Too Much Information" as a single, Capitol Records planned to issue "Femme Fatale" as the next single from Duran Duran, accompanied by a video directed by the photographer Ellen von Unwerth. According to Malins, this plan was abandoned after "Too Much Information" failed to gain significant radio momentum, which led to the single campaign being discontinued. The song was, however, released as a single in France in 1993.

"Femme Fatale" received negative reviews from critics. Stuart Maconie of Q described it as a "hideously misjudged stadium rock version" of the Velvet Underground song, contrasting it with what he considered stronger material on Duran Duran. Paul Sinclair of SuperDeluxeEdition wrote that while the track was "pleasant enough", its inclusion on the album "seem[ed] totally pointless" and that it "really adds nothing". Jim Farber of Entertainment Weekly similarly criticised the cover, calling it a "breathtakingly clueless" interpretation.

=== Track listing ===
All tracks are produced by Duran Duran and John Jones. All tracks are written by Duran Duran except where noted.

French CD single
No.	Title	Writer	Length
1.	"Femme Fatale"	Lou Reed	4:24
2.	"Fallen Angel"		4:35
3.	"Stop Dead"		4:32
Total length:			13:31
