= Drowning Man (Duran Duran song) =

- US picture sleeve

Promotional single by Duran Duran

from the album Duran Duran
- Released: 1993
- Studio: Privacy (Battersea); Maison Rouge (London)
- Length: 5:14
- Label: Capitol; Parlophone
- Songwriter: Duran Duran
- Producers: Duran Duran; John Jones

Audio video
- "Drowning Man" on YouTube

"Drowning Man" is a song by the English pop rock band Duran Duran from their seventh studio album, Duran Duran (1993), commonly known as The Wedding Album. Written during extensive studio sessions, the track originated from the bassist John Taylor's idea to pursue a dance-based sound. Musically, it has been described as drawing on elements of techno, house, trance, and the underground rave scene, and features a half-rapped vocal delivery from the singer Simon Le Bon. The song was later issued as a single in the United States, where it peaked at number forty on Billboard's Dance Club Songs chart, and has received mixed reception.

== Background and composition ==
The keyboardist Nick Rhodes recalled that "Drowning Man" was developed during extensive writing sessions for their seventh studio album Duran Duran (1993), explaining that the bassist John Taylor's idea to make the album dance music based resulted in the song. Critics have described its musical style in a variety of ways: Paul Sinclair of SuperDeluxeEdition called it a "housey, trancey number", Andrea Odintz of Rolling Stone observed its "thud and repetitive keyboards of techno", Annie Zaleski of Ultimate Classic Rock wrote that it drew "from the sounds and textures of the underground rave scene", and Alan Jones of Music Week highlighted its "sparse dance rhythms". Mark Elliott of Dig! described the track as "another robust, hooky assault on the senses". The song also features a "half-rapped mid-Atlantic vocal" from the vocalist Simon Le Bon.

== Release and reception ==
"Drowning Man" first appeared on Duran Duran upon the album's release on 15 February 1993. It was later issued in the United States as a twelve-inch single and peaked at number forty on Billboard's Dance Club Songs chart for the week of 25 September 1993.

"Drowning Man" received mixed reception from critics. The author Steve Malins criticised Le Bon's vocal performance on the song, describing it as "charmless". Sinclair was particularly critical, calling it "not very good" and arguing that it should have been left off Duran Duran in favour of a B-side, adding that it was "discordant and not in keeping with most of the album". In contrast, Jones cited the song as an example of how "Clearly a great deal of thought and care has gone into producing a light and diverse album".

== Track listing ==
All tracks are written by Duran Duran. All tracks are produced by Duran Duran and John Jones except where noted.

Side one
No.	Title	Producer	Length
1.	"Drowning Man (12" A)"	Duran Duran; John Jones; D:Ream^{[a]}	6:29
2.	"Drowning Man (Instrumental)"		6:29
3.	"Drowning Man (Dub)"	Duran Duran; Jones; D:Ream^{[a]}	6:28
Total length:			19:26

Side two
No.	Title	Length
4.	"Drowning Man (Ambient Dub)"	6:45
5.	"Drowning Man (Album version)"	5:14
Total length:		11:59

Notes

- ^{^[a]} signifies an additional producer

== Personnel ==
Duran Duran

- Simon Le Bon – lead vocals
- Warren Cuccurullo – guitar
- Nick Rhodes – keyboards
- John Taylor – bass guitar

Additional musicians

- John Jones – programming, keyboards, drums
- Karen Hendrix – vocal samples
- Jack Merigg – vocal samples

Production

- Duran Duran – production
- John Jones – production, engineering
- David Leonard – mixing
- Kevin Metcalfe – mastering

== Charts ==
Chart performance for "Drowning Man"
Chart (1993)	Peak position
US Dance Club Songs (Billboard)	40
