= Duran Duran (1993 album) =

Studio album by Duran Duran

- Upper left: the Le Bons, centre: the Bateses (Rhodes), upper right: the Taylors, lower right: the Cuccurullos.

Studio album by Duran Duran
- Released: 15 February 1993 (Note: Music Week, a contemporary source, cites 15 February 1993 as the release date, along with the BPI. Despite this, Duran Duran's official website state that the release date is 11 February.)
- Recorded: January 1991 – 1992
- Studios: Privacy (Battersea); Maison Rouge (London)
- Genres: Pop rock; dance-pop
- Length: 62:35
- Label: Parlophone
- Producers: Duran Duran; John Jones

Duran Duran chronology
| Liberty (1990) | Duran Duran (1993) | Thank You (1995) |

Singles from Duran Duran
- 1. "Ordinary World" Released: December 1992; 2. "Come Undone" Released: March 1993; 3. "Too Much Information" Released: August 1993

Duran Duran is the seventh studio album by the English pop rock band Duran Duran, released on 15 February 1993 through Parlophone. It is the band's second eponymous album, the first being their 1981 debut album, and is commonly referred to as the Wedding Album.

== Background ==
By the early 1990s, Duran Duran's career appeared to be in decline. Their 1990 album Liberty, despite debuting at number eight in the UK Albums Chart, quickly fell out of favour, struggling commercially and critically in both the UK and the US. Singles such as "Violence of Summer (Love's Taking Over)" and "Serious" failed to make significant chart impacts, while much of the album's material was met with indifference or outright criticism from the press. Reflecting on this period, band members Nick Rhodes and Simon Le Bon admitted to a lack of focus during the creation of Liberty, with Le Bon noting, "There were times when everyone in the band felt like giving up."

After the commercial disappointment of Liberty, Duran Duran entered a period of uncertainty. Drummer Sterling Campbell departed the band quietly, later joining Soul Asylum. The remaining members faced personal and professional challenges: John Taylor struggled with his mental health, Rhodes was navigating a difficult marital breakup while caring for a young child, and Le Bon expressed a desire to escape to a quieter life by the sea. In contrast, guitarist Warren Cuccurullo emerged as the driving force behind the band during this period. Reflecting on his determination, Cuccurullo stated, "I was the hungriest. I wanted success. I wanted to go beyond where I had gone. All I had was my music." He converted the living room of his house in Battersea, London, into a makeshift studio, which became the primary workspace for the band's next project. Rhodes supported the idea, commenting that the space had a more inviting atmosphere compared to traditional studios.

== Development and recording ==
In January 1991, Duran Duran began work on their next album at Privacy Studios. The home studio offered freedom from both the high costs of traditional facilities and the pressure of deadlines. "We'd never recorded in a home studio before," recalled Taylor, noting that while the songwriting process remained largely the same as on previous projects, the relaxed setting meant they no longer had to "keep looking at the clock". Still, Taylor admitted that the lack of deadlines came with drawbacks. "Artists don't do well with time on their hands," he wrote, adding that without a fixed schedule, creative energy could wane.

At this stage, the band worked without a producer. Using sequencers, drum machines, synthesisers, and Cuccurullo's guitar rig, they began writing and jamming. Rhodes later recalled that they wrote continuously, sometimes producing interesting material, other times struggling to make progress. Le Bon noted that for the first time in the band's career, lyrics were entered into a PSION Organiser handheld computer and printed for studio use. Recordings were also made directly onto a hard drive, marking a shift toward digital production techniques. EMI, the band's label, remained involved but adopted a more cautious approach. Rather than provide a large upfront advance, the label, under the new A&R head Nick Gatfield, opted to release funding incrementally, evaluating the band's songwriting progress on a monthly basis. According to Taylor, this marked the first time Duran Duran had been "tightly A&R'd".

John Jones produced the album with us, and he was a great 'ear' to have around. He had a great knowledge of classical structure of songs. With what we were trying to do, he was the right inspiration to have around. he helped steer some of the songs and generally contributed a good sense of direction for the album's arrangement.

— Nick Rhodes, 2013

After several months of initial writing, the producer and engineer John Jones was brought in to help shape the project and demo the band's ideas. Jones had a prior history with the band, having first collaborated with them on the B-side "This Is How a Road Gets Made", released with the Big Thing (1988) single "Do You Believe in Shame?". He also contributed programming to the 1989 single "Burning the Ground" and Liberty. Jones recalled that the band wanted both creative freedom and a way to avoid the expense of a traditional studio. They asked if recording in a living room was possible, and Jones replied that it was, and that they could at least begin with demos to see how far the approach would take them.

Recording for Duran Duran began with a makeshift setup centered around an Akai MG1214 console with its built-in 12-track recorder. Studio monitors included AR Red Boxes and an Auratone, while each member worked from their own station: Cuccurullo's guitars and sequencers, Rhodes' keyboards, and Taylor's bass, all feeding into the system through Yamaha DMP7 mixers. Jones worked with an Atari computer running Notator sequencing software, using Akai S1000 and S900 samplers alongside a Roland D-50 synthesizer. For initial takes, the band recorded live together, each member equipped with a Shure SM58 microphone to communicate and capture rough vocals.

The band's first goal was to demo about 15 songs, and although they had total creative control, it was felt the album should be made with input from the record company. After tracking "Ordinary World" and three other songs on the analogue 12-track, they transitioned to a more advanced system, bringing in two Akai ADAM digital 12-track recorders and a DDA DMR12 console. According to the album's liner notes, all songs were recorded on the Akai ADAM system through the DDA DMR12 desk. According to Jones, the experience of playing together in a shared room was essential: the musicians often gathered around a single microphone in the center of the room, singing or clapping spontaneously, with Le Bon recording lead vocals in the same informal manner. Many of these early takes were retained for the final album, reflecting the group's desire to preserve the immediacy of their demos rather than polish away imperfections. Le Bon later explained that this approach marked a shift from the band's earlier preference for highly polished production: "We never used to like leaving rough edges on, but now that's changed."

Between January and April 1991, the group wrote extensively, generating much of the material that would comprise the album. Le Bon later reflected that they had finally found "a rhythm of working and an attitude we have been aiming for since 1985". By July of that year, they had composed songs such as "Love Voodoo", "Sin of the City", "Too Much Information", "UMF", and "Ordinary World". Taylor's idea to make the album dance music based resulted in "Drowning Man". "Sin of the City", reflects the band's decision to embrace rougher, less polished elements in their music. The song ends with an extended jam section that arose spontaneously during recording. According to Taylor, a drum machine pattern slipped out of sync while he and Cuccurullo were playing, prompting them to change key and continue improvising until they gradually stopped and set down their instruments. Rather than edit the passage, the band chose to keep the entire take, allowing the track to run until the drum program finished.

"Breath After Breath" was a collaboration with the Brazilian singer Milton Nascimento. According to Jones, the track began as an instrumental demo created by himself and Cuccurullo. A cassette of the demo was sent to Nascimento, and after a period of silence, the band eventually received a tape in return containing his vocal ideas. Nascimento's contributions, which included melodies and vocal lines, impressed the band immediately. Without having heard Nascimento's recording, Le Bon had also written his own vocal parts. When Nascimento arrived in London, both artists recorded their sections on the same day. As Jones described it, the session captured "unbelievable magic".

After a week's break in mid-1991 and some attempts to mix a couple of tracks on the newly acquired console, the band decided to move part of the process to a professional studio. Live drums, commissioned for "Ordinary World" and "Too Much Information", were recorded within a few hours at Maison Rouge Studios in South-West London by the drummer Steve Ferrone and the engineer Tony Taverner. In addition to the drum work, Rhodes and Jones finalised the string and keyboard arrangements for "Ordinary World" during sessions at Maison Rouge. Further refinements were made using the Akai DD1000 digital recorder, including amendments to the drums and acoustic guitar parts.

In May 1992, Le Bon sustained an injury in a motorcycle accident in Dyfed, Wales. Rhodes recalled being horrified by the incident. During this time, the band explored additional recording ideas, including a cover of the Velvet Underground's "Femme Fatale", reportedly suggested by Frank Zappa through his friendship with Cuccurullo. The song was recorded in a grand, echoey style and was ultimately included on the album. "Come Undone" was another late addition, conceived and recorded after Duran Duran was already complete in mid-1992. The song stands out as the only track on the album to which Taylor didn't contribute bass, as he already went home to Los Angeles.

=== Mixing ===
After the final additions made by Jones and Rhodes, mixing for "Ordinary World" was attempted by Steve MacMillion in the United States, by Jones and Dee Long in the United Kingdom, and by David Richards in Switzerland, but the results were not considered satisfactory. David Leonard was then brought in, and Jones later recalled that he did "a fantastic job". Leonard's mix was cut at London's Townhouse Studios, though the final release took an unexpected turn. While in London for The Freddie Mercury Tribute Concert, Richards revisited the track on his own initiative, producing a new mix that the band ultimately preferred and issued commercially. Richards' involvement extended beyond "Ordinary World". He mixed the majority of the album from Mountain Studios, a process Cuccurullo remembered as transformative, praising Richards for creating sonics that felt "like you'd taken drugs before having a listen". According to Cuccurullo, Richards was suggested by Taylor to do some mixing. Leonard's contributions also remained part of the album: he mixed "Drowning Man" and "Femme Fatale".

== Composition ==
Musically, Duran Duran is a pop rock and dance-pop album that incorporates elements of rock, electronica, and experimental music. It was also widely noted for presenting a more mature and confident version of the band. Stephen Thomas Erlewine of AllMusic noted that although the group sounded "more relaxed and mature" than during its early-1980s peak, "not all that much has changed". Instead of the synth-driven dance-pop, the band delivered what he called "smooth dance pop for the '90s", which he considered as effective as their first three studio albums. The Independent described it as "an album of maturity and confidence", a view echoed by Chris Gerard of Metro Weekly, who contrasted it with the uncertainty of Liberty. Andrea Odintz writing for Rolling Stone also remarked on the sense of evolution, noting that the album abandoned both the "computerized lustfulness" of Big Thing and the "generic soulfulness" of Liberty.

The biographer Steve Malins emphasised the richness of its production, built on programmed beats but layered with organic textures. Taylor's bass was said to ground the songs with warmth, while Rhodes' keyboards played a reduced role, though his electric piano contributed a cinematic tone to the band's cover of "Femme Fatale". Malins noted Cuccurullo's prominent guitar work throughout, from the "dense, Fripp-like" textures of "Too Much Information" to the Brazilian-inspired acoustic instrumentation of "Breath After Breath". His playing was also cited as central to the ballads "Ordinary World" and "Come Undone", as well as the atmospheric textures of "Love Voodoo". In The Philadelphia Inquirer, Sam Wood highlighted a lyrical transformation, observing that the "strings of ridiculous non sequiturs" in earlier hits like "The Reflex" and "Union of the Snake" were replaced by songs engaging with themes such as American decline, moral outrage at slumlords, and even criticism of MTV.

=== Songs ===
"Too Much Information" is a keyboard-propelled rock song, described by Malins as "classic Duran Duran—shiny, energetic, rowdy, plastic and full of great hooks". Lyrically, Malins pointed out its critique of "over-hyped, pop-trash culture", quoting the line “Destroyed by MTV/I hate to bite the hand that feeds/There's too much information." Taylor connected the song's theme to the glut of television and media, and Rhodes explained that its inspiration came in part from Gulf War coverage, which he described as an "immoral" trivialisation of real events. David Chiu of Forbes placed the track in the context of a "pre-Internet commentary about mass media overload", while Bryan Reesman of American Songwriter summarised it as an "ode to advertising and media overload". "Ordinary World" features acoustic guitars, keyboards, and sweeping strings, with a guitar solo near the end of the song written and arranged by Cuccurullo that reflected his progressive background. Lyrically, it is one of three Duran Duran songs in which Le Bon wrote about his friend David Miles, who died of a drug overdose in 1986. "Love Voodoo" combines a slinky rhythm with a sharp rhyme scheme, underpinned by a descending chord progression in the verses and a prominent chorus. Sinclair highlighted its "seductive melody", along with keyboard flourishes and a sparing acoustic guitar figure that adds lightness to the arrangement. Zaleski described the track as a "languid electro seduction", while Rhodes characterised it as a "twisted love story", likening its mood to Kiss of the Spider Woman (1976).

"Drowning Man" is built around repetitive keyboards and sparse dance-oriented rhythms. Critics described the track as drawing from techno, house, and trance, as well as incorporating textures associated with the underground rave scene. The 55-second segue "Shotgun", featuring a Prince-inspired riff, leads into "Come Undone", a trip hop-inflected ballad. The song features watery keyboards, a circular guitar riff, and a laid-back drum loop. Le Bon delivered what Zaleski called one of his "most delicate and emotional vocal performances", singing lyrics he wrote for his wife, Yasmin Le Bon, imagery that reflects both vulnerability and tenderness. Tessa Niles contributes counter-singing that underpins the song's theme of "discovering a deep romantic connection with someone". Her vocals provide a counterbalance during certain verses. "Breath After Breath" is a ballad featuring Nascimento, who contributes vocals in Portuguese. The track has been described as romantic-sounding and samba-flavored, while also carrying a melancholic melodic lift reminiscent of A-ha. "U.M.F." has been described as a Prince-like funk and R&B song. According to Odintz, Rhodes, Taylor, and Cuccurullo mimic Prince's "calculated groove" while Le Bon adopts "the appropriate vocal nuances". Sinclair highlighted the track's witty lyric, its use of horns, whistling, and "oooh oooh" backing vocals, as well as its extended outro section.

"Femme Fatale", a cover of the Velvet Underground song, was given a dreamy and atmospheric treatment by Duran Duran. Malins noted that their version "relocated the song from the icy street hassle of New York into Los Angeles' glimmering Californian sunshine", while Zaleski described it as adding an element of introspection. "None of the Above" is an upbeat pop song with nimble guitar work. The track begins with an a cappella chorus, followed by verses, a contrasting break, and a cracking chorus. Its arrangement also includes an extended guitar section by Cuccurullo toward the end of the song. "Shelter" has been described as a "heavy-footed funk workout". It features prominent synthesisers that interrupt with urgency, leading Mark Elliott of Dig! to note that it is perhaps the only track on the album that might have been recorded during the band's mid-1980s peak. "To Whom It May Concern" carries a similar funk sound and takes the form of a chant-like protest song, with lyrics written by Rhodes that reference "some people" and "Mr. Bones." "Sin of the City" runs for more than seven minutes and features a compulsive vocal hook. The song's lyrics, written by Taylor, are about the Happy Land fire.

== Packaging and title ==
=== Packaging ===
The photos of these 8 people, on the day they were married, that was the DNA that was to come to form us, to make that album.

— Nick Rhodes on the idea behind the album's cover, 2013

The album cover for Duran Duran features a collage of sepia-toned vintage wedding photographs of the band members' parents, with a solitary gold Duran Duran logo positioned at the centre. Rhodes had the idea of putting the band members' parents' wedding photographs on the cover. According to him, the idea originated when he came across one of his parents' wedding photographs while visiting them and wondered what the other members' parents' wedding photographs looked like. (Note: Taylor later recalled that naming the instrumental track "Shotgun" after Jones jokingly described his marriage to Amanda de Cadenet in December 1991 as "a shotgun wedding" indirectly led to the band naming the record The Wedding Album and to Rhodes's sleeve concept featuring the wedding-day photographs of their parents. Krassner, however, wrote that "The band had, in fact, instigated the idea that it would end up being called The Wedding Album by everyone if only to differentiate it from the first Duran Duran album.") Although he was initially unsure how the idea would be received, Rhodes recalled that the other members embraced it. After the band gathered their parents' wedding photographs, Rhodes recalled that they all reacted with "wow!" when they saw them together for the first time. Katy Krassner said that the photographs "had the atmosphere the band was hoping for" and that Rhodes liked the idea that they represented "the total sum of the DNA that created the people who were making this record." Rhodes later remarked that they "couldn't have made this better if we had gone looking for old photos in some archives."

The album cover was designed by Nick Egan and his graphic design assistant Eric Roinestad in collaboration with the band. According to Egan, Taylor mentioned to the actor Billy Zane that he was looking for Egan to design the cover, and Zane revealed that he and his wife Lisa were friends with him. Zane also told Taylor that Egan was in London at the time. Egan met Taylor at his London home within hours, where Taylor outlined the band's concept of using their parents' wedding photographs. Rhodes recalled that the band sent the photographs to Egan to create a montage without telling him the album's title, while Krassner noted that Egan was also asked to use a "Duran Duran logo, but no other words." Egan later said he believed The Wedding Album was the record's working title because of the photographs that were to be used on the cover. His immediate concern about the project was to avoid it "becoming kitsch which nearly all wedding photos have the tendency to be, white, lacey with silver horse-shoe confetti decorations". Wanting the artwork to resemble a "piece of art", he turned to the work of the artist Robert Rauschenberg, who Egan said "laid seemingly random images on top of each other with the faintest hint of off register color as if the whole thing was screen printed". The resulting design was produced in a sepia tone with what Egan described as "gold leaf accents".

Egan said that, in keeping with the album's "low-tech do-it-yourself concept", embossed plastic lettering created with a Dymo label printer and chinagraph grease pencil on masking tape was used, giving the package what he called an "organic 'Pop Art' feeling". Andrew Dineley of Classic Pop described the artwork across the album and its accompanying singles as a "DIY-style, punk-era fanzine pastiche", writing that it appeared to draw on a variety of influences, from Jean-Michel Basquiat's "raw illustrative sketching" to Andy Warhol-inspired overlaid print effects. Egan later wrote that Roinestad "laid the whole thing out, but the whole package was really a collaboration between me and the band."

Taylor also outlined to Egan the band's concept of going against the previous notion of commissioning an expensive album-cover photo shoot by visiting "the last remaining public photo booths in and around London with a few pounds in change" and having their portraits taken as black-and-white 2 by 6-inch strips. Egan later said:

It was this concept that convinced me that this was going to be something special visually, but it also made me realize that Duran were one of the most innovative and creative bands of theirs - and subsequent - generations. They were never predictable.

The band subsequently used the London Student Union photo booth to take their portraits, one of the last black-and-white photo booths they could find in London at the time. (Note: The album's liner notes credit the individual band photographs as "courtesy of University of London Student's Union photo booth" and credit Adrian Green for the band photograph.) The members had been warned beforehand to bring change and were the only people using the booth. Taken while the album was being completed, the photographs became part of its artwork. Krassner said in 2007 that Rhodes still had the photo strips and had not decided what to do with them. In 2013, Duran Duran made the previously unseen strips available through its official website to commemorate the 20th anniversary of the album's release.

For the album's 30th anniversary, Duran Duran's website revealed an alternative artwork proof from the band's archives. The image included a note from the graphic designer suggesting that "we could add the wedding pics as additional collage".

=== Title ===
During production, the album was known by several working titles. Richard Buskin of Recording Musician wrote that, when Duran Duran began working in January 1991, the project was titled Here Comes the Band. Jesse Nash of The Hard Report reported in February 1992 that Le Bon said the album would either be titled Four on the Floor or Ordinary World, the latter after one of its songs. Lindores later wrote that Four on the Floor referred to the four band members "crashing" on the studio floor after sessions "petered out" into the early hours. Krassner said the band still had no album title as the album's sessions were approaching an end, noting that they had previously always had a "firm favourite" by that stage. She also said that the group felt it needed to re-establish the "brand" Duran Duran, leading to internal discussions about leaving the album untitled and simply putting the band's name on the cover. The album was ultimately released as Duran Duran, which Rhodes said reflected the band's return to basics. It became known as The Wedding Album because its cover featured wedding photographs of the band members' parents.

== Release ==
By mid-1992, Duran Duran had completed their new album and delivered it to Capitol Records. The album, however, was not immediately released. Taylor noted that this approach contrasted with EMI's past practice of releasing material as soon as it was completed. According to Malins, their new management company Left Bank were struck by what they saw as Capitol's "unbelievable apathy" towards the band and advised postponing the project until 1993, a move also influenced by Rhodes' ongoing divorce proceedings. Mark Lindores of Classic Pop writes that Capitol themselves were hesitant to prioritise Duran Duran, choosing instead to focus on other acts; promotional cassettes with an alternate track list, featuring future B-sides "Time For Temptation" and "Stop Dead", were sent to media outlets and record stores before being revoked.

In mid-August 1992, Radio & Records reported that a Tampa radio station had received a cease and desist order after playing Duran Duran's forthcoming single "Ordinary World" ahead of its official release. To bypass the restriction, program director Jay Taylor created a "Q105 Duran Duran Listen-Line", which he said logged hundreds of calls per day. Zaleski later described the incident as an early indication of strong interest in the song. According to Malins, near the end of 1992, Capitol themselves circulated "Ordinary World" to select US radio stations roughly three months before its planned release date, with DJs reportedly receiving hundreds of requests within the first day. The label subsequently rush-released the single on 19 December 1992. It reached number three on the Billboard Hot 100 and number six on the UK Singles Chart following its release in the UK by EMI and Parlophone on 18 January 1993.

In advance of Duran Duran's release, Music Week reported that Parlophone was "pulling out all the stops" to support the album. The label mounted a television campaign aimed at women over 25, described as "grown-up Duranies", and coordinated a range of promotional activity. Advertising included a full-page colour placement in Sky magazine, a half-page in Hello!, and further ads in the Daily Mirror, Daily Mail, and Time Out in cooperation with Tower Records. A one-week regional TV campaign was also planned, alongside poster displays at British Rail sites from March. In-store promotion featured point-of-sale materials such as posters and name boards at fifty independent retailers, while Virgin showcased the album on listening posts. Tower Records committed to window displays, and both HMV and Our Price gave the release prominent space in their stores. At the time of the campaign, "Ordinary World" was already on the charts, and "Come Undone" was scheduled as the follow-up single for 22 March 1993.

Duran Duran was released on 15 February 1993 in the UK by Parlophone and on 23 February in the US by Capitol. In the UK, the album debuted and peaked at number four, remaining on the UK Albums Chart for 23 weeks. In the US, it entered and peaked at number seven the following month and stayed on the Billboard 200 for 47 weeks. According to Malins, the album remained in the US Top Twenty for five months. Zaleski noted that the record marked Duran Duran's first Top Ten US record since the 1984 live album Arena. In the UK, it was awarded Silver status by the British Phonographic Industry (BPI) on 1 March 1993 for sales exceeding 60,000, and Gold on 1 April for sales surpassing 100,000. In the US, the Recording Industry Association of America (RIAA) certified the album Platinum on 18 June 1993 for sales of more than one million. Malins further records that the album was awarded additional platinum discs in South America and across the Far East, generating total global sales of around five million.

"Come Undone" was released as the second single on 29 March 1993. The accompanying music video was directed by the filmmaker Julien Temple and produced by Kirstyn Symes for Nitrate Films. Much of the video was shot on location in Los Angeles, with a key sequence filmed overnight in the aquarium at London Zoo. Commercially, "Come Undone" peaked at number 13 in the UK and number 7 in the US. According to Sinclair, its performance helped push Duran Duran back up the charts worldwide. Zaleski similarly observed that the single demonstrated the triumph of "Ordinary World" was not a one-off.

"Too Much Information" was released as the third single on 23 August 1993. Its accompanying music video, directed by Egan and produced by Larry Perel for Satellite Films, was issued earlier on 5 July 1993. The video featured the band performing on the rooftop of the Capitol Tower in Los Angeles. Commercially, the single did not match the success of its predecessors. It peaked at number 35 in the UK and stalled at number 45 in the US. Malins later noted that this suggested fans preferred the softer balladry of "Ordinary World" and "Come Undone" to the new single's more "swaggering, slightly tongue-in-cheek" tone. In response, Capitol briefly considered following it with the cover of the Velvet Underground's "Femme Fatale", complete with an androgynous-styled video by the photographer Ellen von Unwerth. However, the plan was abandoned after "Too Much Information" lost radio momentum, effectively ending the album's single campaign. Reflecting on this Sinclair argued that choosing "Too Much Information" as the third single was "a big mistake — the first mistake in what was, until that point, a flawless campaign".

=== Other releases ===
In addition to the three main singles, several other tracks from Duran Duran saw limited or regional release. According to Sinclair, "Breath After Breath" was considered "commercial enough" for a video to be made, and there were hints at one point that it might be released as a fourth single. As Malins notes, the video included some footage filmed at the Iguacu Falls on the border of Argentina and Brazil. Despite this, the track was never issued commercially as a single. "Drowning Man" was released as a single in the US in 1993. It only reached number 40 on Billboard's Dance Club Songs chart. In France, "Femme Fatale" was released as a single in 1993, and in Japan, "None of the Above" was released as a single in 1994. In addition to these singles, a two-CD special edition of Duran Duran was released in late 1993, featuring the non-album B-sides "Falling Angel", "Time For Temptation", and "Stop Dead". EMI did not release any of these tracks on UK singles at the time, meaning they did not become available in the country until this special edition.

== Critical reception ==
Professional ratings
Contemporary reviews
Review scores
| Source | Rating |
|---|---|
| Calgary Herald | C |
| Entertainment Weekly | D |
| Knoxville News Sentinel | 4/5 stars |
| Music Week | 4/5 stars |
| North County Times | B− |
| The Philadelphia Inquirer | 3/4 stars |
| Select | 2/5 medals |
| Southtown Star | 4/4 stars |
| Staten Island Advance | B+ |
| Winston-Salem Journal | 2.5/5 stars |

Duran Duran received mixed reviews upon its release, with opinions reflecting on the band's attempt at a comeback. Sam Wood of the Philadelphia Inquirer described the album as a potential "second coming of the Duranies", praising the shift toward "pop respectability" with tracks like the ballad "Ordinary World". He commended the thematic maturity of the lyrics, the inclusion of Brazilian artist Milton Nascimento on "Breath After Breath," and the album's strong dance-pop influences, likening its quality to 1986's Notorious. Alan Jones of Music Week offered a positive assessment, giving the album four out of five stars. He noted that the band had put considerable thought and care into the album's production, highlighting its diversity. He concluded that the album demonstrated unexpected strength and affirmed that Duran Duran remained "a force to be reckoned with."

In contrast, Jim Farber of Entertainment Weekly gave the album a "D" rating, criticising its production as "overproduced" and the songwriting as lacking the memorable melodies of the band's earlier work. He described "Ordinary World" as a weaker derivative of its influences and singled out the cover of the Velvet Underground's "Femme Fatale" and the collaboration with Nascimento as ineffective. Dave Obee of the Calgary Herald observed that the band struggled to distance themselves from their 1980s success while attempting to reconnect with audiences. He noted their influential role in the music industry but remarked on the challenge of maintaining relevance. Similarly, Clark Collis of Select acknowledged the success of singles like "Ordinary World" but criticised the album for inconsistent quality and a lack of innovation, suggesting that it rarely matched the high points of its standout tracks.

=== Retrospective assessments ===
Professional ratings
Review scores
| Source | Rating |
|---|---|
| AllMusic | 4/5 stars |
| The Encyclopedia of Popular Music | 3/5 stars |
| Rolling Stone | 2/5 stars |
| The Rolling Stone Album Guide | 2.5/5 stars |
| Spin Alternative Record Guide | 4/10 |

Retrospective reviews of Duran Duran have been mixed, with critics reflecting on the album's strengths and its place in the band's career. Stephen Thomas Erlewine of AllMusic praised the album for blending Duran Duran's classic style with a more mature approach, describing it as a successful adaptation to the 1990s music landscape. He highlighted "Ordinary World" and "Come Undone" as standout tracks, calling them "wonderful pop singles", but noted weaker moments, such as the cover of the Velvet Underground's "Femme Fatale".

Andrea Odintz of Rolling Stone offered a more reserved perspective. She acknowledged the band's effort to evolve by incorporating elements of Prince and techno but felt the album was more compelling when the band leaned on their own distinctive style. While she praised "Ordinary World" for its spiritual qualities, Odintz criticized some tracks for following contemporary trends too closely and suggested that the album was uneven in quality compared to their earlier successes.

== Reissue ==
On 10 April 2026, Duran Duran and the band's following album Thank You (1995) were reissued for the first time since their original releases. The new releases, through Warner Records, are available on double LP and CD formats and feature no bonus tracks.

== Track listing ==
All tracks are written by Duran Duran, except where noted.

| No. | Title | Writer(s) | Length |
|---|---|---|---|
| 1. | "Too Much Information" | | 4:55 |
| 2. | "Ordinary World" | | 5:40 |
| 3. | "Love Voodoo" | | 4:58 |
| 4. | "Drowning Man" | | 5:14 |
| 5. | "Shotgun" | | 0:54 |
| 6. | "Come Undone" | | 4:38 |
| 7. | "Breath After Breath" | Duran Duran; Milton Nascimento | 4:57 |
| 8. | "U.M.F." | | 5:32 |
| 9. | "Femme Fatale" | Lou Reed | 4:21 |
| 10. | "None of the Above" | | 5:18 |
| 11. | "Shelter" | | 4:23 |
| 12. | "To Whom It May Concern" | Nick Rhodes | 4:23 |
| 13. | "Sin of the City" | | 7:14 |
| Total length: | | | 62:35 |

Japan bonus tracks
| No. | Title | Length |
|---|---|---|
| 1. | "Time for Temptation" (Alternate version) | 3:46 |
| 2. | "Stop Dead" (Edit) | 3:52 |

Deluxe Edition bonus tracks
| No. | Title | Length |
|---|---|---|
| 14. | "Falling Angel" | 4:35 |
| 15. | "Stop Dead" | 4:31 |
| 16. | "Time for Temptation" | 4:09 |
| 17. | "A View to a Kill" | 3:33 |

Bonus disc (UK tour edition)
| No. | Title | Length |
|---|---|---|
| 1. | "Falling Angel" | 4:35 |
| 2. | "Stop Dead" | 4:31 |
| 3. | "Time for Temptation" | 4:09 |
| 4. | "Come Undone" (12" mix – Comin' Together) | 7:21 |
| 5. | "Ordinary World" (Acoustic version) | 5:07 |
| 6. | "Too Much Information" (David Richards 12" mix) | 4:14 |

== Personnel ==
Adapted from the album's liner notes.

Duran Duran

- Simon Le Bon – lead vocals
- Warren Cuccurullo – acoustic and electric guitars
- Nick Rhodes – keyboards
- John Taylor – bass guitar (except track 6)

Additional musicians

- John Jones – programming, engineer, keyboards, drums (all tracks except 1, 2, 7 and 9), bass (track 6)
- Milton Nascimento – vocals (track 7)
- Steve Ferrone – drums (tracks 1 and 2), percussion (track 10)
- Vinnie Colaiuta – drums (track 7 and "Falling Angel")
- Dee Long – additional keyboards (track 11)
- Bosco – percussion (track 7)
- Lamya – backing vocals (track 3)
- Tessa Niles – backing vocals (track 6)
- Karen Hendrix – vocal samples (track 4)
- Jack Merigg – vocal samples (track 4)

Production

- Duran Duran – production (all tracks), mixing (track 5)
- John Jones – production (all tracks), engineering (all tracks except track 9), sub-mixing, mixing (track 5)
- Tony Taverner – live drum session engineering (tracks 1, 2, 7, and 9)
- Stuart Every – assistant live drum session engineer (tracks 1, 2, and 7)
- David Richards – mixing (tracks 1–3, 6–8, and 10–13)
- David Leonard – mixing (tracks 4 and 9)
- Kevin Metcalfe – mastering

== Charts ==
=== Weekly charts ===
Weekly chart performance for Duran Duran
| Chart (1993) | Peak position |
|---|---|
| Australian Albums (ARIA) | 20 |
| Austrian Albums (Ö3 Austria) | 12 |
| Canada Top Albums/CDs (RPM) | 8 |
| Dutch Albums (Album Top 100) | 23 |
| European Albums (Music & Media) | 13 |
| Finnish Albums (Suomen virallinen lista) | 18 |
| French Albums (IFOP) | 32 |
| German Albums (Offizielle Top 100) | 22 |
| Greek Albums (IFPI) | 9 |
| Hungarian Albums (MAHASZ) | 34 |
| Italian Albums (Musica e dischi) | 6 |
| Japanese Albums (Oricon) | 24 |
| Portuguese Albums (AFP) | 9 |
| Swedish Albums (Sverigetopplistan) | 21 |
| Swiss Albums (Schweizer Hitparade) | 23 |
| UK Albums (Official Charts) | 4 |
| US Billboard 200 | 7 |

| Chart (2025–2026) | Peak position |
|---|---|
| Greek Albums (IFPI) | 15 |
| Norwegian Physical Albums (IFPI Norge) | 8 |
| Scottish Albums (Official Charts) | 17 |

=== Year-end charts ===
Year-end chart performance for Duran Duran
| Chart (1993) | Position |
|---|---|
| Canada Top Albums/CDs (RPM) | 23 |
| European Albums (Music & Media) | 35 |
| German Albums (Offizielle Top 100) | 79 |
| UK Albums (OCC) | 50 |
| US Billboard 200 | 48 |

== Certifications and sales ==
Certifications for Duran Duran
| Region | Certification | Certified units/sales |
|---|---|---|
| United Kingdom (BPI) | Gold | 100,000^{^} |
| United States (RIAA) | Platinum | 1,000,000^{^} |
Summaries
| Worldwide | — | 5,000,000 |
^{^} Shipments figures based on certification alone.

== Release history ==
Release history for Duran Duran
| Country | Date | Label | Format(s) | Catalogue number |
|---|---|---|---|---|
| Europe | 15 February 1993 | Parlophone | CD | CDDDB 34 |
| United Kingdom | 15 February 1993 | Parlophone | Cassette | TCDDB 34 |
| United Kingdom | 15 February 1993 | Parlophone | LP | DDB 34 |
