= Happy Land fire =

1990 arson attack in the Bronx, New York

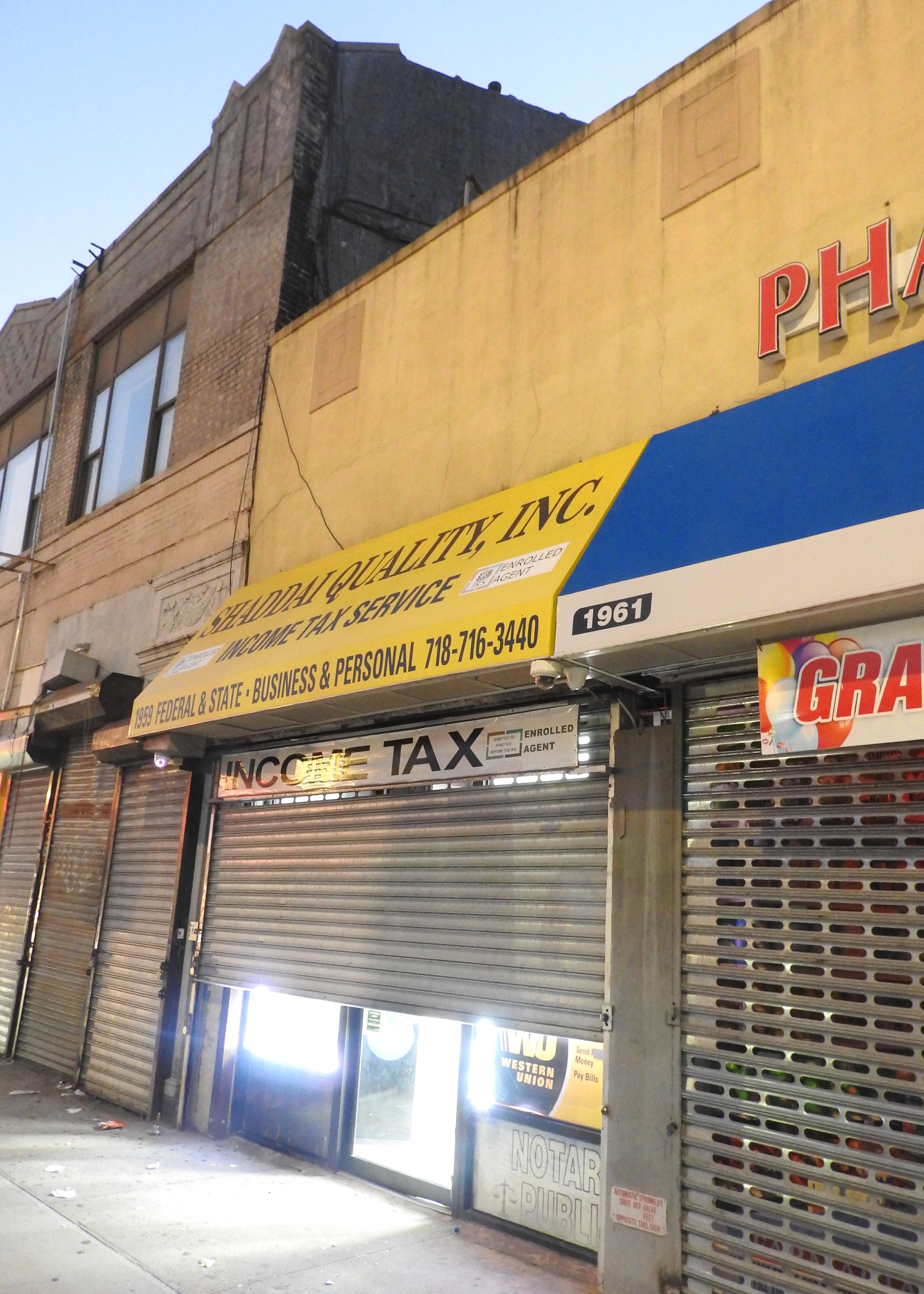
- Present building at 1959 Southern Boulevard that replaced the social club
- Location: 40°50′35.2″N 73°53′9.4″W; West Farms, Bronx, New York, U.S.
- Date: March 25, 1990; 36 years ago c. 3 a.m. EDT
- Target: Happy Land social club
- Attack type: Arson; mass murder; massacre
- Deaths: 87
- Injuries: 7
- Perpetrator: Julio González
- Motive: Argument with ex-girlfriend

The Happy Land fire was an act of arson and mass murder that killed 87 people on March 25, 1990, in the Bronx in New York City, United States. The 87 victims were trapped in the unlicensed Happy Land social club, located at 1959 Southern Boulevard in the West Farms section of the Bronx. Most victims were young Hondurans celebrating Carnival, many of them part of the Garifuna American community. Cuban refugee Julio González, whose former girlfriend was employed at the club, was arrested soon afterward and ultimately convicted of arson and murder.

The fire was the deadliest in New York City since the Triangle Shirtwaist Factory fire in 1911, and the deadliest in American territory since the Dupont Plaza Hotel fire in Puerto Rico in 1986 and the Winecoff Hotel fire in 1946.

== Background ==
The building that housed Happy Land club was managed by Jay Weiss, the primary leaseholder, and Morris Jaffe. In 1987, Weiss and Jaffe's company, Little Peach Realty Inc., leased the building space for seven years to the club owner, Elias Colon, who died in the fire. An eviction trial against Colon had been scheduled to start on March 28, 1990, three days after the fire.

Before the blaze, Happy Land was ordered in November 1988 to close for building code violations including lack of fire exits, alarms or a sprinkler system. No follow-up by the fire department was documented.

Julio González served three years in prison in Cuba during the 1970s for desertion from the Cuban Army. In 1980, he faked a criminal record as a drug dealer to help gain passage in the Mariel boatlift. The boatlift landed in Florida; he then traveled to Wisconsin and Arkansas and eventually settled in New York, sponsored by the American Council for Nationalities in Manhattan.

Six weeks before the fire, he split up with his girlfriend, Lydia Feliciano. Before that, González had lost his job at a lamp factory in Queens. At the time of the fire, he was two weeks behind on the rent of his room, and the owner of the boarding house where he was staying said of him: "From what I know, he was down to his last hope."

== Incident ==
The evening of the fire, González argued with his former girlfriend, Feliciano, who was a coat check worker at the club, urging her to quit. She said that she had had enough of him and did not want anything to do with him any longer. He was ejected by the bouncer around 3:00 a.m. He was heard to scream drunken threats to "shut this place down." He also reportedly shouted, "I'll be coming back." Feliciano tried to warn others, worried that González would do something.

González went to an Amoco gas station, then returned to the establishment with a plastic container with $1.00 worth of gasoline. He spread the fuel at the base of a staircase, the only access into the club, and then ignited the gasoline.

Eighty-seven people died in the resulting fire. Nineteen bodies were found downstairs; the others upstairs. Six bodies were found within several feet of the front door. Some of those trapped punched a hole through a wall to an adjoining union hall in an attempt to escape. Most deaths were from asphyxiation or trampling. The club filled with toxic smoke so quickly that some victims were found with drinks still in hand. Most victims were young Hondurans celebrating Carnival, largely drawn from members of the local Garifuna American community. A hundred and fifty firemen responded to the blaze, which was extinguished in five minutes.

Initial reports indicated that only three people survived the blaze, but later reports gave the number of survivors as five or six. Among them were Feliciano, the club owner's wife, and disc jockey Ruben Valladares. Valladares was hospitalized in guarded condition with second- and third-degree burns over half his body.

After setting the fire, González returned home, removed his gasoline-soaked clothes and fell asleep. He was arrested the following afternoon after police investigators interviewed Feliciano and learned of the previous night's argument. Once advised of his rights, he admitted to starting the blaze.

== Legal proceedings ==
=== Arsonist ===
González was charged with 174 counts of murder, two for each victim, and was found guilty on 87 counts of arson and 87 counts of murder on August 19, 1991. For each count, he received the maximum sentence of 25 years to life. He was eligible for parole during March 2015 as New York law states that the sentences for multiple murders occurring during one act must be served concurrently, rather than consecutively.

González was denied parole in March 2015. He would have been eligible to apply for parole again in November 2016, but he died of a heart attack while in prison, on September 13, 2016, at the age of 61.

=== Landlords and other parties ===
The Bronx District Attorney said that the building's owner, Alex DiLorenzo III, and leaseholders Weiss and Morris Jaffe, were not responsible criminally, since they had tried to close the club and evict the tenant. Weiss was at the time the husband of actress Kathleen Turner. The New Yorker quoted Turner saying that "the fire was unfortunate but could have happened at a McDonald's".

Although the Bronx District Attorney said they were not criminally responsible, the New York City Corporation Counsel filed misdemeanor charges in February 1991 against Alex DiLorenzo III, the building owner, and Jay Weiss, the primary leaseholder. These charges claimed that the owner and landlord were responsible for the building code violations caused by their tenant. They both pleaded guilty in May 1992, agreeing to perform community service and paying $150,000 towards a community center for Hondurans in the Bronx.

A $5 billion lawsuit was also filed by the victims and their families against the owner, landlord, city, and some building material manufacturers. That suit was settled in July 1995 for $15.8 million or $163,000 per victim. The lesser amount was due mostly to unrelated financial difficulties of the landlord.

== Legacy ==
The Happy Land fire became one of the deadliest acts of mass murder in American history and remains the deadliest by a single perpetrator.

The street outside the former Happy Land social club has been renamed "The Plaza of the Eighty-Seven" in memory of the victims. Five victims were students at nearby Theodore Roosevelt High School, which held a memorial service for the victims in April 1990. A memorial was erected directly across the street from the former establishment with the names of all 87 victims inscribed on it.

The plot of the Law & Order season 2 episode "Heaven" was inspired by the Happy Land fire.

Additionally, the band Duran Duran wrote the song "Sin of the City", which appeared on the band's 1993 self-titled album, about the fire. The song "Happyland" on Joe Jackson's album Night and Day II, released in 2000, was also inspired by this event. In the Jay-Z song "You, Me, Him and Her" he raps "The fire I spit burnt down Happy Land social club, we unapproachable thugs."

In the aftermath of the Ghost Ship warehouse fire in Oakland, California, in December 2016, which killed 36 people, comparisons were drawn to this fire. The Oakland fire also occurred in a space that was being used for parties in violation of law and lease agreement. Investigations of the law and lease agreements were pending at the time of that fire as well.

== See also ==
- List of accidents and disasters by death toll
- List of disasters in the United States by death toll
- List of fires
- List of building or structure fires
- List of nightclub fires
- Blue Bird Café fire, 1972 fire in Montreal also started by ejected patrons lighting gasoline on stairs that served as the only way in or out
- Denmark Place fire, 1980 fire at illegally operated London club patronized by Caribbean immigrants also started by an angry patron refused admission
- 2022 Bronx apartment fire, New York City's deadliest fire since this event.
