= None of the Above (song) =

- Cover art for the 1994 Japanese single release

Promotional single by Duran Duran

from the album Duran Duran
- Released: 15 February 1993
- Studio: Privacy (Battersea); Maison Rouge (London)
- Genre: Pop; rock-funk
- Length: 5:18
- Label: Parlophone
- Songwriter: Duran Duran
- Producers: Duran Duran; John Jones

Audio video
- "None of the Above" on YouTube

"None of the Above" is a song by the English pop rock band Duran Duran from their seventh studio album, Duran Duran (1993), commonly known as The Wedding Album. It has been described as an upbeat pop and rock-funk song with bass-heavy instrumentation and guitar work. In 1994, the song was later released in Japan as a single.

"None of the Above" has been praised by critics, who highlighted its melody, arrangement, the singer Simon Le Bon's vocal performance, and lyrics. Commentators also suggested it could have been released as a single outside Japan.

== Composition ==
Musically, "None of the Above" has been described as pop and rock-funk. Annie Zaleski of Ultimate Classic Rock highlighted the song's "nimble guitar work" while Mark Elliott of Dig! called it "bass-heavy". Paul Sinclair of SuperDeluxeEdition noted that Duran Duran were "not trying to sound 'contemporary', just like themselves", and remarked on Warren Cuccurullo's guitar work, noting that he "lets loose" around the three-minute mark and that the guitar contribution near the end of the track, around 3:56, is "wonderful".

Described as an "ode to self-discovery and empowerment" by Elliott, Scott Spence of the Tri-City Herald grouped the song with others on Duran Duran (1993) that were written "as social statements, hyping the woes of society". Sinclair highlighted several compositional elements: he wrote that the track "follows Nile Rodgers' Chic 'rulebook'" by beginning with an a cappella chorus, and emphasised its focus on "melody and a great arrangement". He outlined its structure as moving from verses beginning with "There was a time..." to a "blistering" break marked by "Can't take this attitude..." before reaching the "cracking" chorus of "I am I myself alone...".

== Release ==
"None of the Above" first appeared on Duran Duran upon the album's release on 15 February 1993. The following year, the song was issued in Japan as a single in the three-inch CD tanzaku (or "snap-pack") format, which included advertising for the Honda Integra. This release featured a "12-inch Extended Mix" of the track, later retitled the "Driza Bone Mix" when it appeared on the Canadian "White Lines (Don't Do It)" CD single in 1995. However, the "Single Edit" of this remix remains exclusive to the Japanese CD single.

== Reception and legacy ==
Upon Duran Duran's release, "None of the Above" received generally positive reception. Nick Krewen of The Hamilton Spectator described it as one of the album's "exquisite uptempo numbers", while Mario Tarradell of the Miami Herald called the song "decent". McInally of the Missoulian included "None of the Above" among the best songs on the album, saying they "approach the frenzied pop trashiness of the band's best singles". Chuck Campbell of the Knoxville News Sentinel viewed it less favorably, grouping "None of the Above" with several tracks that "pass as fuzzy filler".

Later reviewers and authors have offered several positive assessments of "None of the Above". Paul Sinclair of SuperDeluxeEdition called it "one of my favourite Duran Duran songs" and highlighted multiple aspects of its composition, including its "fantastic" verse melody, "superb" vocal performance from the singer Simon Le Bon, and "thoughtful lyric". He further noted that "nothing feels forced in this song, all the different elements fit together like a glove", describing it as delivering "great melody and wonderful bits of arrangement", with "spot on" production. Sinclair also remarked that the track was released as a single in Japan but "really could have (should have?) been a single in the UK", though he found the accompanying twelve-inch "Drizabone Mix" disappointing. Elliott expressed a similar view, describing it as "the single that should have been" and "one of The Wedding Album's strongest melodies". The author Steve Malins in his biography of Duran Duran referred to "None of the Above", along with other tracks on the album, as "skilfully polished constructs".

== Track listing ==
All tracks are written by Duran Duran. All tracks are produced by Duran Duran and John Jones except where noted.

Japanese three-inch CD single
No.	Title	Producer	Length
1.	"None of the Above (Single Edit)"		4:41
2.	"None of the Above (12" Extended Mix)"	Duran Duran; John Jones; Billy April^{[a]}; Vince Garcia^{[a]}	6:38
3.	"None of the Above (LP Mix)"		5:18
Total length:			16:37

Notes

- ^{^[a]} signifies an additional producer

== Personnel ==
Duran Duran

- Simon Le Bon – vocals
- Warren Cuccurullo – guitar
- Nick Rhodes – keyboards
- John Taylor – bass guitar

Additional musicians

- John Jones – programming, keyboards
- Steve Ferrone – percussion

Production

- Duran Duran – production
- John Jones – production, engineering
- David Richards – mixing
- Kevin Metcalfe – mastering
