= Come Undone (Duran Duran song) =

1993 single by Duran Duran

Single by Duran Duran

from the album Duran Duran
- B-side: "Ordinary World" (acoustic)
- Released: 29 March 1993
- Studio: Privacy (Battersea, England)
- Genre: Soft rock; dance-rock
- Length: 4:15 (edit); 4:38 (album version)
- Label: Parlophone
- Songwriter: Duran Duran
- Producer: Duran Duran

Duran Duran singles chronology
"Ordinary World" (1992)	"Come Undone" (1993)	"Too Much Information" (1993)

Music video
- "Come Undone" on YouTube

"Come Undone" is a song by English rock band Duran Duran, released in March 1993 through Parlophone as the second single from their seventh studio album, Duran Duran (1993). With their commercial and critical success reestablished by the previous single "Ordinary World", "Come Undone" continued to showcase more of the band's entry into the adult contemporary radio format.

The single became the group's second consecutive US top-10 hit from Duran Duran, peaking at number seven on the Billboard Hot 100 and becoming their last top-40 hit on that chart. It was also popular in the United Kingdom and other international markets, reaching number one in Israel, number two in Canada, number eight in Italy, number nine in Ireland, and number 13 in the UK. As of October 2021, "Come Undone" is the eighth-most streamed Duran Duran song in the UK. The accompanying music video was directed by Julien Temple.

== Development and recording ==
"Come Undone" originated during sessions at the guitarist Warren Cuccurullo's home studio, "Privacy" Studios, in Battersea, London. According to the producer John Jones, the song was developed from a reworking of "First Impression", a track from Duran Duran's Liberty (1990) album. Cuccurullo proposed the idea, and the new track was built around a drum loop and bass line from Jones' own song "Face to Face". Jones emphasised the track's simplicity, noting, "all it is is a loop", and described the writing process as unusually fast. According to the author Annie Zaleski, the drum loop was not sampled from "Ashley's Roachclip" by the Soul Searchers, as has been widely reported, but was an original recording. This denial is supported by the keyboardist Nick Rhodes, who directly addressed the rumor in a fan Q&A, stating that the song "most certainly" did not sample the track and describing the claim as "untrue". He added that the story is simply a rumor, noting, "No wonder you can't hear it — it isn't there."

After completing the initial instrumental, Jones and Cuccurullo played the track over the phone to Capitol Records' A&R department in Los Angeles, and then to Rhodes and the lead vocalist Simon Le Bon. Rhodes arrived within hours to contribute, and the music was finalised that same afternoon. The track also had origins in a slowed-down version of "Too Much Information", initially created as an experiment by Cuccurullo and Rhodes. Cuccurullo revealed to the author Steve Malins that he and Rhodes had originally planned on using the song for a project outside of Duran Duran with Gavin Rossdale, but had changed plans when Le Bon took a liking to the music and began to come up with lyrics on the spot. He recorded his vocals the following night. On the third day, the singer Tessa Niles recorded her backing vocals and additional overdubs. She recalled working under the direction of Cuccurullo and Rhodes, who produced the session. Initially singing in a soft, breathy tone, Niles was encouraged by Rhodes to "unleash the diva". The song was mixed on the fourth day.

"Come Undone" stands out as the sole track on Duran Duran (1993) to which the bassist John Taylor did not contribute. The song was the final one recorded after the album was already completed. At that stage, Taylor had completed his parts for all the other songs and had left for Los Angeles to spend time with his wife. In an interview with the BBC, Taylor remarked, "Maybe I wished I'd played on 'Come Undone'. I'd gone back to Los Angeles. We'd put that album to bed. I'm not coming back for one more song. Maybe it would have been a different song if I'd been there, maybe it wouldn't have been such a great song. But I'm not one for regrets."

== Music video ==
The music video for "Come Undone" was directed by British film, documentary and music video director Julien Temple, who shot the video inside of an aquarium. Produced by Kirstyn Symes for Nitrate Films, it was released on 29 March 1993. The bulk of the video was filmed on location in Los Angeles, but a pivotal section was shot overnight in the aquarium at London Zoo. It features multiple, unrelated clips of people in different areas. These include a little girl seeing her parents together, an older couple who have survived a flood, a little girl hiding under the bed while placing her head on top of her white teddy bear, an alcoholic, and a man who is revealed to be a cross-dresser. Also seen in the video is underwater model Lauren Heston lip-syncing the backing singer Tessa Niles portion of the song, struggling underwater to break free of the chains that bind her. A portion of the music video can be seen in the "No Laughing" episode of the MTV show Beavis and Butt-Head, which was aired in July 1993.

== B-sides, bonus tracks and remixes ==
The single was released in the United Kingdom on 29 March 1993, with an acoustic version of "Ordinary World" as the B-side. This was the single's official B-side in the UK, along with two official remixes of "Come Undone". In the US however, three new, original compositions written during the album's production were featured as B-sides – "Time for Temptation", "Stop Dead" and "Falling Angel". For collectors, the US releases also contained an alternate mix of "To the Shore" and the first appearance on CD of "The Chauffeur (Blue Silver)".

== Track listings ==
- UK 7-inch and cassette single

A. "Come Undone" (edit) – 4:15
B. "Ordinary World" (acoustic version)

- UK CD1 and Japanese CD single
1. "Come Undone" (edit) – 4:15
2. "Ordinary World" (acoustic version)
3. "Come Undone" (FGI Phumpin' 12-inch) – 8:14
4. "Come Undone" (La Fin De Siecle) – 5:25
- UK CD2
1. "Come Undone" (album version)
2. "Rio"
3. "Is There Something I Should Know?"
4. "A View to a Kill"
- US CD single
1. "Come Undone" (LP version)
2. "Come Undone" (Mix 1 Master)
3. "Skin Trade" (Parisian mix)
4. "Stop Dead"
- US and Canadian cassette single
1. "Come Undone" (album version)
2. "Come Undone" (Mix 2 Master)
3. "Time for Temptation"
- Australian CD single
1. "Come Undone" (edit)
2. "Come Undone" (FGI Phumpin' 12-inch)
3. "Come Undone" (La Fin De Siecle)
- The Singles 1986–1995 box set
1. "Come Undone" (edit) – 4:15
2. "Ordinary World" (acoustic version) – 5:05
3. "Come Undone" (FGI Phumpin' 12-inch) – 8:14
4. "Come Undone" (La Fin De Siecle) – 5:25
5. "Come Undone" (album version) – 4:31
6. "Rio" – 5:33
7. "Is There Something I Should Know?" – 4:05
8. "A View to a Kill" – 3:33

== Personnel ==
Duran Duran

- Simon Le Bon – vocals
- Nick Rhodes – keyboards, synth bass
- Warren Cuccurullo – guitar, vocals

Additional musicians

- John Jones – drums, bass, keyboards, vocals
- Tessa Niles – backing vocals

== Charts ==
=== Weekly charts ===
Weekly chart performance for "Come Undone"
Chart (1993)	Peak position
Australia (ARIA)	19
Belgium (Ultratop 50 Flanders)	42
Canada Retail Singles (The Record)	2
Canada Top Singles (RPM)	2
Europe (Eurochart Hot 100)	34
Europe (European Hit Radio)	5
Finland (Suomen virallinen lista)	48
France (SNEP)	26
Germany (GfK)	42
Iceland (Íslenski Listinn Topp 40)	13
Ireland (IRMA)	9
Israel (Israeli Singles Chart)	1
Italy (Musica e dischi)	8
Netherlands (Dutch Top 40 Tipparade)	16
New Zealand (Recorded Music NZ)	16
Spain Airplay (Top 40 Radio)	26
Sweden (Sverigetopplistan)	21
UK Singles (Official Charts)	13
UK Airplay (Music Week)	2
US Billboard Hot 100	7
US Adult Contemporary (Billboard)	19
US Alternative Airplay (Billboard)	12
US Pop Airplay (Billboard)	2
US Cash Box Top 100	4

2024 weekly chart performance for "Come Undone"
Chart (2024)	Peak position
Kazakhstan Airplay (TopHit)	50

=== Monthly charts ===
2024 monthly chart performance for "Come Undone"
Chart (2024)	Peak position
Kazakhstan Airplay (TopHit)	91

=== Year-end charts ===
1993 year-end chart performance for "Come Undone"
Chart (1993)	Position
Australia (ARIA)	96
Canada Top Singles (RPM)	11
Israel (Israeli Singles Chart)	2
US Billboard Hot 100	41
US Cash Box Top 100	45

2024 year-end chart performance for "Come Undone"
Chart (2024)	Position
Kazakhstan Airplay (TopHit)	195

== Certifications ==
Certifications for "Come Undone"
Region	Certification	Certified units/sales
New Zealand (RMNZ)	Gold	15,000^{‡}
^{‡} Sales+streaming figures based on certification alone.

== Release history ==
Release dates and formats for "Come Undone"
Region	Date	Format(s)	Label(s)	Ref.
United Kingdom	29 March 1993	7-inch vinyl; CD1; cassette	Parlophone	
United Kingdom	5 April 1993	CD2	Parlophone	
Australia	10 May 1993	CD; cassette	Parlophone; EMI	
Japan	30 June 1993	CD	EMI	
Australia	19 July 1993	CD digipak	Parlophone; EMI	
