= Burning the Ground =

1989 single by Duran Duran

Single by Duran Duran
- B-side: "Decadance"
- Released: 4 December 1989
- Studio: Olympic (London)
- Length: 4:00 (single version)
- Label: EMI; Capitol
- Songwriters: John Barry; Simon Le Bon; John Taylor; Roger Taylor; Andy Taylor; James Bates
- Producer: John Jones

Duran Duran singles chronology
"Do You Believe in Shame?" (1989)	"Burning the Ground" (1989)	"Violence of Summer (Love's Taking Over)" (1990)

Music video
- "Burning the Ground" on YouTube

"Burning the Ground" is a song by the English pop rock band Duran Duran, released on 4 December 1989 as a stand-alone single to promote the compilation album Decade. The song is a megamix of Duran Duran's history created by producer John Jones, featuring snippets of the band's biggest hits from the previous decade into a new piece of music. However, the track was not included on the Decade album itself.

Its music video was included on the band's audiovisual compilation Greatest, released in 1999 (VHS) and 2003 (DVD).

== Composition ==
The remix was created by producer John Jones, with assistance from Dee Long and engineer Chris Potter, in an upstairs room at Olympic Studios in Barnes while Duran Duran was downstairs recording new material for the album Liberty, to be released the following year.

== Music video ==
The video for "Burning the Ground", much like the song, used snippets of many of Duran Duran's previous audiovisual work, including scenes from their 1985 concert film Arena (An Absurd Notion) and their 1987–1989 Strange Behaviour and Electric Theatre world tours. The video also used footage of burning South American rainforests, as well as the NASA Space Shuttles and even some scenes of the band walking around in the street during the recording sessions for their then-upcoming Liberty album. It was directed by Adrian Martin.

== B-sides, bonus tracks and remixes ==
The B-side was another megamix, this one more instrumental in nature, called "Decadance". The song uses the "why" bits of "The Reflex", the "no, no" from "Notorious", "wild" from "The Wild Boys", the chorus from "All She Wants Is", the solo from "Save a Prayer" mixed with "Rio", and a little bit of "Skin Trade", as well as some of the suggestive screams from "Hungry Like the Wolf" & the camera snap shots from "Girls On Film" "Planet Earth" & "A View To A Kill" was also used.

== Critical reception ==
Upon single release Melody Maker reviewer Mick Mercer called the song a "sample-heavy thing" in "The Reflex" style.

== Formats and track listings ==
=== 7″: EMI / DD 13 United Kingdom ===
1. "Burning the Ground" – 4:00
2. "Decadance" – 3:29

=== 12″: EMI / 12DD 13 United Kingdom ===
1. "Burning the Ground" – 4:00
2. "Decadance" – 3:29
3. "Decadance" (extended mix) – 7:57

=== 12″: Capitol / V-15546 United States ===
1. "Burning the Ground" – 4:00
2. "Decadance" (extended mix) – 7:57
3. "Decadance" – 3:29

=== CD: EMI / CD DD 13 United Kingdom ===
1. "Burning the Ground" – 4:00
2. "Decadance" – 3:29
3. "Decadance" (extended mix) – 7:57

=== CD: The Singles 1986–1995 box set ===
1. "Burning the Ground" – 4:00
2. "Decadance" – 3:29
3. "Decadance" (2 Risk E remix 12") – 7:57

== Charts ==
Weekly chart performance for "Burning the Ground"
Chart (1989–1990)	Peak position
Ireland (IRMA)	23
Italy (Musica e dischi)	2
Italy Airplay (Music & Media)	6
UK Singles (Official Charts)	31
US Billboard Hot Dance Club Play	23

== Personnel ==
Duran Duran

- Simon Le Bon – vocals
- Nick Rhodes – keyboards
- John Taylor – bass guitar
- Warren Cuccurullo – guitar
- Sterling Campbell – drums
