= Black N White =

Black n White

Studio album by John Jones
- Released: 4 November 2009
- Studio: The Dell, Drumroll and Bernie Grundman Mastering, Los Angeles
- Genre: Rock
- Length: 49:00
- Label: John Jones Music
- Producer: John Jones (record producer)

John Jones chronology
One Moment in Time (1998)	Black n White (2009)	Songs of 1993 Vol. 1 (2016)

Singles from Black n White
- 1. "Never" / "21st Century Schizoid Man" Released: 4 November 2009

Black n White is the second studio album by John Jones, released on 4 November 2009 by John Jones Music and Artis Tech Media. The recording sessions began in Jones's Hollywood Dell studio. Overdubs continued at Drumroll studios in Burbank with drum legend Steve Ferrone, with mixes completed in Rodeo studio, and mastered at Bernie Grundman Mastering in Hollywood. Black N White was the last recording carried out in the Hollywood Dell tree house that previously recorded tracks for Duran Duran, Steve Ferrone, Fleetwood Mac, Dan Hill, Alan Frew, Celine Dion, and was the temporary home of Alanis Morissette during her Jagged Little Pill sessions.

Black n White is a rock album that incorporates blues, classical, pop and progressive rock.

== Composition and recording ==
=== Background ===
The songs on the Black n White album were written and recorded by John Jones during a two-month period of 2002. Drums were added in 2006 and the album was mixed in 2008.

==== "Dear Please" ====
"Dear Please" is based on a cello phrase that is a variation of J.S. Bach's Unaccompanied Cello Suite No. 1: Prelude.

Drum legend Steve Ferrone accompanies Jones creating a captivating groove in 6/8 time, that is rare in rock music.

==== "Never" ====
Jones was inspired to write "Never" after an experiencing a powerful dream about a perfect natural World without the industrial poisons of the second millennium.

"Never" has the flavour of Led Zeppelin mixed with a rock mantra influenced by Kundalini Yoga. Drums by Steve Ferrone. Written by John Jones.

==== "21st Century Schizoid Man" ====
"21st Century Schizoid Man" was written by King Crimson and released on their 1969 LP, In the Court of the Crimson King as a dark warning about the future of mankind.

Jones takes the angst of the 1960s, and with the help of Ferrone, turns it into a grooving reggae style swinger for the real 21st century.

==== "She's Got To Know" ====
"She's Got To Know" was performed in a Paul McCartney singing style. Steve Ferrone adding the rolling groove. Written by John Jones.

==== "Get A Dog" ====
"Get A Dog" is an upright groove song about loneliness in modern society. Drums by Steve Ferrone. Written by John Jones.

==== "Already Gone" ====
"Already Gone" is a very Beatles influenced song that was written by John Jones about a relationship that was doomed before it started. Drums by Steve Ferrone.

==== "The Open Door" ====
"The Open Door" is a powerful Led Zeppelin influenced track about the angst of suicide. Drums by Steve Ferrone. Written by John Jones.

==== "If This Is It" ====
"If This Is It" recalls the 1960s pop songs of love. Drums by Steve Ferrone. Written by John Jones.

==== "Sorry" ====
"Sorry" is a twist on an ordinary apology. Drums by Steve Ferrone. Written by John Jones.

==== "Kathleen" ====
"Kathleen" is a powerful ballad about losing love. Drums by Steve Ferrone. Written by John Jones.

==== "Where's My Rainbow" ====
"Where's My Rainbow" is a multi part song that looks for happiness in middle age. Drums by Steve Ferrone. Written by John Jones.

==== "Inside" ====
"Inside" is a romantic ballad about a broken heart, written and performed by Jones.

==== "Awesome" ====
"Awesome" is an a cappella song performed by John Jones.

== Release history ==
Country	Date	Label	Format	Catalogue number
Worldwide	4 November 2009	John Jones Music	LP	PCS 0002

== Production notes ==
Black N White was recorded using the digital audio work stations; Logic and Pro Tools. Production took place in the Dell tree house studio, Hollywood, with overdubs recorded at Drumroll studios, Burbank, and at Rodeo studio, Los Angeles. The album was mastered at Bernie Grundman Mastering in Hollywood, California.

== Album cover ==
The cover was designed by Jimmy McKeever to represent: a jester; a propeller; yin and yang; inside out; black n white.

== Track listing ==
All tracks are written by John I. Jones, except where noted.

No.	Title	Drums	Length
1.	"Dear Please"	Ferrone	3:58
2.	"Never"	Ferrone	4:39
3.	"21st Century Schizoid Man" (King Crimson)	Ferrone	3:06
4.	"She's Got To Know"	Ferrone	4:24
5.	"Get A Dog"	Ferrone	3:10
6.	"Already Gone"	Ferrone	3:46
7.	"The Open Door"	Ferrone	4:28
8.	"If This Is It"	Ferrone	3:33
9.	"Sorry"	Ferrone	3:39
10.	"Kathleen"	Ferrone	4:00
11.	"Where's My Rainbow"	Ferrone	4:36
12.	"Inside"	Jones	3:44
13.	"Awesome"	none	1:27

Notes

- "Awesome" appears as a hidden track.

== Personnel ==
- John Jones – lead, harmony and background vocals; lead, bass, and rhythm guitars; acoustic and electric pianos, Hammond organ and synthesizer; sound effects; percussion
- Steve Ferrone – drums and percussion;

Production

- Produced by John Jones (record producer)
- Recorded by John Jones (record producer)
- Mixed by John Jones (record producer)
- Executive Production: Kevin Carmony, Emily Richards, Jason Brock, Alex Goodwin
- Mastered by Mike Bozzi and Jimmy McKeever at Bernie Grundman Mastering
