= Too Much Information (song) =

1993 single by Duran Duran

Single by Duran Duran

from the album Duran Duran
- B-side: "Drowning Man" (D:Ream mix)
- Released: 23 August 1993
- Genre: Rock; pop rock
- Length: 4:56
- Label: Parlophone
- Songwriters: Simon Le Bon; John Taylor; James Bates; Warren Cuccurullo
- Producers: John Jones; Duran Duran

Duran Duran singles chronology
"Come Undone" (1993)	"Too Much Information" (1993)	"Perfect Day" (1995)

Music video
- "Too Much Information" on YouTube

"Too Much Information" is a song by English pop rock band Duran Duran, released in August 1993 by Parlophone and Capitol Records as the third single from their seventh studio album, Duran Duran (1993). In the United Kingdom, it became the band's third top-40 single from the album, while in North America, it peaked at numbers 45 and 41 on the US Billboard Hot 100 and Cash Box Top 100, and number 26 in Canada. The accompanying music video for "Too Much Information" was directed by Nick Egan.

== Release ==
In the United Kingdom, the 12-inch vinyl, cassette, and first CD single were released on 23 August 1993, while the second CD single was issued on 30 August. Those who bought the cassette received a free No Ordinary EP cassette with live tracks ("Hungry Like the Wolf", "Notorious", "Come Undone"), recorded during a performance at Tower Records a few months before. These recordings also appeared as bonus tracks on various global CD releases of the single.

== Critical reception ==
Alan Jones from Music Week gave the song three out of five in his review, describing it as "somewhat less atmospheric than 'Come Undone' and more world-weary than 'Ordinary World'. It won't be as big as either but should still perform well enough to give them another Top 30 hit."

== Music video ==
The music video for "Too Much Information" was directed by British director Nick Egan and produced by Larry Perel for Satellite Films. It was released on 5 June 1993 and features the band performing on top of the Capitol Tower.

== Personnel ==
Duran Duran

- Simon Le Bon – vocals
- Nick Rhodes – keyboards
- John Taylor – bass guitar
- Warren Cuccurullo – acoustic and electric guitar, background vocals

Additional musicians

- John Jones – keyboards
- Steve Ferrone – drums

== Charts ==
Chart (1993)	Peak position
Australia (ARIA)	93
Canada Top Singles (RPM)	26
Europe (Eurochart Hot 100)	85
Israel (Israeli Singles Chart)	2
New Zealand (Recorded Music NZ)	48
Spain Airplay (Top 40 Radio)	38
UK Singles (Official Charts)	35
UK Airplay (Music Week)	21
US Billboard Hot 100	45
US Alternative Airplay (Billboard)	30
US Dance Club Songs (Billboard)	17
US Cash Box Top 100	41

== Release history ==
Region	Date	Format(s)	Label(s)	Ref.
United Kingdom	23 August 1993	12-inch vinyl; CD1; cassette	Parlophone	
United Kingdom	30 August 1993	CD2	Parlophone	
Australia	18 October 1993	CD; cassette	Parlophone; EMI	
Japan	27 October 1993	CD	EMI	
