= Antonella Nota =

Italian astronomer

Antonella Nota is an Italian astronomer, the executive director of the International Space Science Institute in Bern, Switzerland and an emeritus astronomer at the Space Telescope Science Institute in Baltimore, US. Her research interests include star formation and young star clusters; she has also worked on public outreach connecting science with art, and on advocating for underrepresented groups including women in astronomy.

== Education and career ==
Nota is originally from Venice, but was a student at the University of Padua. She was seconded to the Space Telescope Science Institute by the European Space Agency in 1986, and continued working for the ESA there until retiring as head of the ESA office at the institute in 2022. She was named as director of the International Space Science Institute beginning in 2023.

== Recognition ==
Nota was elected to the Istituto Veneto di Scienze, Lettere ed Arti in 2017. She was a 2022 recipient of the NASA Exceptional Public Service Medal. In 2023 the American Astronomical Society (AAS) named Nota as a Fellow of the AAS, "for extraordinary scientific leadership and service to the international astronomy community, facilitating a key partnership between NASA and the European Space Agency, and for inspiring and engaging the public with the discoveries of the Hubble Space Telescope".
