= Network on Terminal Architecture =

NoTA Main architecture

NoTA Interconnect architecture

Network on Terminal Architecture (i.e. NoTA) is a modular service based system architecture for mobile and embedded devices. NoTA enables mobile device makers speed-up their product development by shortening the integration phase. Additionally NoTA makes it possible to quickly bring-in 3rd party innovations into the products due to loosely coupled and functional-driver -less approach.

NoTA device consists of Service Nodes (SN) and Application Nodes (AN) that communicate through logical Interconnect (IN). IN provides two basic means of communication, namely message based and streaming type. The former is bi-directional and used for Service Messages. The latter one is uni-directional and used for large amounts of data like media content. Service Nodes have unique Service Identifier (SID).

Service Nodes and Application Nodes map into sub-systems consisting of all software and hardware resources needed to implement those. In order to maintain system level modularity, the only way for a node to use SW&HW resources from other sub-systems is through Services Nodes.

Interconnect is divided into two layers, namely High Interconnect (H_IN) and Low Interconnect (L_IN). The former provides means for service activation and deactivation as well as service and stream accesses. Low Interconnect provides network socket interface with uniform addressing mechanism. L_IN internally can be divided into transport network independent and dependent parts. MIPI Alliance originated solutions are expected to be key enablers for wide use of NoTA.

NoTA Sub-system provides the physical implementation for a set of Nodes (ANs and/or SNs). Sub-system consists of all the software and hardware resources (including peripherals, memories, controllers, internal buses etc.) needed to implement the defined Nodes. The only means for a sub-system to use the other Sub-systems' resources is via Service Nodes. Every NoTA Sub-system consists of the NoTA Interconnect stack.

NoTA principles

- Loosely coupled
- Service based
- Interconnect centric
- Message & data driven (GALS)
- Implementation-wise heterogeneous

== History ==
The NoTA concept and the first implementations were the result of internal Nokia Research Center activities started in 2003. The objective of this work was to develop a novel embedded device architecture that could solve the existing R&D challenges, as well as prepare the company to face the expected horizontalization and digital convergence. The NoTA basic framework was strongly influenced by Network-on-Chip (NoC) and Web Services research.

NoTA Interconnect Release 1 was released in December 2005. Release 1 only consisted of Service communication, activation/deactivation, discovery and access. Release 2 added efficient data communication means, with a handle based stream referencing approach. This functionality, called DOA (Direct Object Access), allows direct memory-to-memory streaming between different NoTA subsystems. Release 2 came out during the second half of 2006. Release 3 became the official public release comprising all the essential functionalities.

== Benefits in product development ==
Fast-time-to-market is possible due to multiple reasons. Product vendors can purchase already productized NoTA Sub-systems removing time needed for vendor specific requirements definition, implementation and integration phases. In case there are no ready-made products on the market, NoTA type system-level modularity allows technology vendors to do the implementation and testing without heavy involvement with other Sub-system provides (e.g. the application engine).

Scalability in integration level allows product companies to do fast cost optimization without major extra R&D effort. NoTA core is physical interconnect agnostic and hence replacing e.g. off-chip interconnect with on-chip interconnect does not destroy the device functionality. More practical example is to integrate multiple ICs into the same package (e.g. through stacking) and use package internal interconnect technologies.

Cost reduction in product development can be achieved in two dimensions. Firstly system-level modularity allows free and fair competition between different technology vendors reducing Sub-system costs. Secondly in many cases product vendors do not have to bear costs incurring from sub-system adaptation work specific to their technologies.

Performance and features meeting end-user needs. Product companies are more agile to adopt new technology or technology that better meets users' needs in digital convergence devices.

== Future Development ==
Due to being agnostic to transport technology, NoTA can be used for many inter-device use-cases (wireless based L_INdown). There are currently projects running e.g. in Finland (SHOK DIEM) and in Japan to apply NoTA in the ubiquitous world. An excellent outcome revealed in the TronShow2010 is the intelligent house built in Taiwan utilizing both the T-Kernel and NoTA technologies. In addition, VTT (Technical Research Center of Finland) has demonstrated their NoTA (and Smart M3) based intelligent Greenhouse.

Extending NoTA to the Internet is one of the research topics. So called NoTA Virtual Device (NVD) is expected to provide a solution here. Through the NVD one can build combined service platforms where the services can be running intra-device, inter-device and/or in the Internet.

== Events ==
- NoTA2008 - 1st International NoTA Conference, Helsinki, Finland, 11 June 2008
- NoTA2009 - 2nd International NoTA Conference, San Jose, CA, U.S.A. 30 September - 1 October 2009
