= John Jones (music producer) =

British-Canadian musician (born 1957)

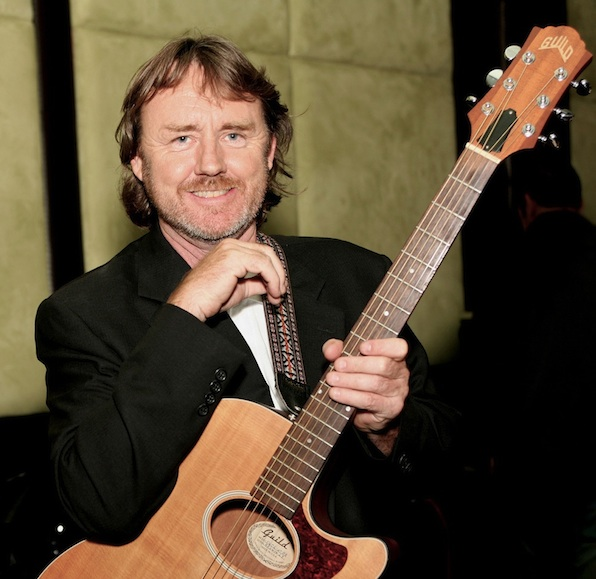
- Jones in Los Angeles (2009)

Background information
- Born: John Idris Jones; December 12, 1957 (age 68)
- Origin: London, England
- Genres: Rock, pop
- Occupations: Musician, record producer, songwriter, composer, audio engineer
- Instruments: Guitar, vocals, keyboards
- Years active: 1975–present

John Jones is a British-Canadian record producer, audio engineer, and musician. He created the Duran Duran megamix single "Burning the Ground" (1989). He was among the producers of Celine Dion’s album Falling into You (1996), for which he received the Grammy Award for Album of the Year at the 39th Annual Grammy Awards. Jones is also credited as a co-producer of “These Strange Times” on Fleetwood Mac’s album Time (1995).

== Career ==
=== 1970s ===
Jones began his musical career in the 1970s. His first recording session was at Toronto Sound Studios under producer Terry Brown. He signed contracts as a singer-songwriter with CBS Songs and ATV Music.

In 1978, Jones joined CBS Canada's pop group, Bond. He contributed to Bond's final recording, I Can't Help It, as a keyboardist, guitarist, and vocalist. Following this, he toured with several bands, including rock cover band FUNN, the show band Canada, and Gary O's Kid Rainbow.

In 1979, Jones partnered with Dee Long of Klaatu, beginning a 15-year musical and business collaboration. After returning to Canada, Long and Jones decided to close ESP Studio before moving to London, England.

=== 1980s ===
In 1980, Jones, Dee Long and drummer Frank Watt designed, built, and operated ESP Studios, a 16-track analogue MCI studio based around a Fairlight CMI in Buttonville, Ontario. They worked on recordings for Klaatu, Alice Cooper, Gary O', Strange Advance, Dalbello, Rational Youth, Bob Ezrin, Red Rider, Images in Vogue, Dan Hill, The Partland Brothers, and Glass Tiger.

While at ESP Studios, Jones wrote songs for Priscilla Wright including the Rational Youth hit "Bang On" and composed film scores for Hot Money, A Perfect Stranger and the TV series Blue Murder.

In 1985, Jones and Long relocated to London, England. While there, Jones worked with George Martin and John Burgess of Associated Independent Recording to set up Studio 5, the Fairlight CMI computer/MIDI music studio at AIR Studios on Oxford Street.

At AIR Studios, Jones worked on projects for Under Milk Wood, Yes, The Rolling Stones, Demis Roussos, Paul McCartney, Terence Trent D'Arby, Elton John, The Outfield, Mark Knopfler, Willy DeVille, Roy Wood and Duran Duran until AIR Studios relocated in 1992.

Jones began working with Duran Duran at AIR Studios, where he produced the B-side single "This Is How A Road Gets Made" and programmed sampled sounds for their Big Thing tour. Soon after, he worked full-time on their Liberty album with producer Chris Kimsey at Olympic Studio in Barnes.

During the Liberty sessions, Jones co-produced the promotional single, "Burning the Ground", which consisted of samples of Duran Duran songs from their Decade: Greatest Hits album release.

=== 1990s ===
In 1990, Jones created samples for John Cale for the album Songs for Drella. He worked again with Chris Kimsey on Paul Rodgers's Laying Down the Law and on the Rolling Stones' Flashpoint, where he edited live tracks and created the intro piece, "Continental Drift".

Jones performed with Duran Duran at the Royal Albert Hall in 1991 for Vanessa Redgrave's Jerusalem for Reconciliation concert for UNICEF. In April 1992, he played with Queen at the Freddie Mercury Tribute Concert in London.

Between 1991 and 1993, Jones co-produced Duran Duran's self-titled comeback record, commonly known as the Wedding Album. During those years, Jones produced Nýdönsk in Iceland, and in November 1993, he performed with Duran Duran for their MTV Unplugged show in New York.

In 1994, he worked on Alan Frew's Hold On for EMI Canada, co-writing the track "So Blind," which won awards from the Society of Composers, Authors, and Music Publishers of Canada for the Most Performed Song of 1995 and for reaching Number 1.

His next co-production with Duran Duran was the 1995 album Thank You, which was voted #1 of the 50 Worst Albums Ever! by Q in 2006.

In 1996, Jones wrote and produced tracks for Dan Hill's I'm Doing Fine, including the Top 10 song "Wrapped". He also produced and performed on Hill's song "Seduces Me" for Celine Dion's multi-platinum album Falling Into You. Additionally, he wrote and produced "These Strange Times" on Fleetwood Mac's Time album, featuring Mick Fleetwood on lead vocals.

At the 39th Annual Grammy Awards, Jones won the Album of the Year as a producer on Celine Dion's album Falling Into You, where he produced and co-wrote the track "Seduces Me".

In 1998, Jones composed scores for the films Stuart Bliss, Lucky Lawson and Ipola, the latter composed with Steve Ferrone.

Jones released his first solo album, One Moment in Time, in 1998. The album produced three MP3.com Pop Chart number-one singles, including "State of Mind" and "Turning Me Inside Out".

=== 2000s ===
Jones's solo album, One Moment in Time, was re-released by Victor Entertainment in Japan in late 2001. This coincided with a Kirin Beer advertising campaign, for which Jones sang lead vocals on the song, I'll Be There, recorded for Simon Le Bon's Japanese music company, Syn Entertainment.

In 2003, Jones and drummer Steve Ferrone co-founded Drumroll Musicians Workshop studio in Burbank, California. Joined by guitarist and producer Steve Postell, they worked on productions and sessions including Ferrone's Farm Fur, Keb' Mo', Emily Richards, Edgar Winter, Jeff Golub, Sabian, Dean & Robert DeLeo, Alex Ligertwood, and Brian Auger. During this time, Ferrone and Jones composed the score for the film Puzzle.

In 2007, Jones began collaborating with Richard Martinez and Meninos do Morumbi, a Brazilian school and social program for favela children, for the Music is Hope Foundation project.

In November 2009, Jones released his second solo album, Black N White, with drums by Steve Ferrone.

=== 2010s ===
Jones worked with composer Nick Wood and musician Julian Lennon on the song "Children of the World". He also worked on "Hope" with Tetsuya Komuro and the Boys & Girls Club of Boston to aid victims of the 2011 Tōhoku earthquake and tsunami in Japan.

Jones produced the 2015 album Meninos Do Morumbi & Friends. In 2018, Jones co-produced the Joey Niceforo orchestral pop album Priceless with Steve Sidwell and Sam Reid. The album was recorded in London at Abbey Road Studios by engineer Steve Price and conducted by Sidwell.

== Discography ==
An incomplete John Jones production discography:

- Crowbar - Larger Than Life (1972)
- Crowbar - Heavy Duty (1972)
- Crowbar- KE32746 (1973)
- Heredity – Rational Youth (1985)
- 1-2-3 – Roy Wood (1987)
- Under Milk Wood – George Martin (1988)
- Burning the Ground – Duran Duran (1989)
- Liberty – Duran Duran (1990)
- Flashpoint – Rolling Stones (1991)
- Duran Duran – Duran Duran (1993)
- Hold On – Alan Frew (1995)
- Thank You – Duran Duran (1995)
- Time – Fleetwood Mac (1995)
- Falling into You – Celine Dion (1996)
- You Give – Emily Richards (1999)
- More Head – Farm Fur (2005)
- Lost Again – Terry McDermott (2016)

An incomplete John Jones solo discography:

- Bond - I Can't Help It (1978)
- One Moment In Time (1998) (Rereleased 2001 and 2010)
- Black N White (2009)
