= Nice (song) =

Single by Duran Duran

from the album Astronaut
- Released: 2005
- Studio: Sphere (London)
- Genre: Pop rock
- Length: 3:27
- Label: Epic
- Songwriter(s): Simon Le Bon; John Taylor; Roger Taylor; Andy Taylor; Nick Rhodes
- Producer(s): Duran Duran; Don Gilmore

Duran Duran singles chronology
"What Happens Tomorrow" (2005)	"Nice" (2005)	"Falling Down" (2007)

Licensed audio
- "Nice" on YouTube

"Nice" is a song by the English pop rock band Duran Duran, released in 2005. It was the third single to be lifted from the group's eleventh studio album, Astronaut (2004).

== Reception ==
David Medsker of PopMatters said "if there is a single moment where things fall seamlessly into place on Astronaut, it is 'Nice', a magnificent melding of Andy's power chords, Nick's wall of synths, and John's octave-jumping disco bass that recalls the best moments of Rio all rolled into one. It's not particularly complex, but neither was 'Hold Back the Rain', a fan favorite to this day. 'Nice' is simple in all the right ways and, like all good pop songs, it knows when to quit, with a cold ending at a mere three minutes and 27 seconds. The label is nuts if they don't release this as the second single."

== Track listings ==
All tracks are written by Duran Duran

Promo CD single (Europe only)
No.	Title	Length
1.	"Nice" (album version)	3:27

Digital download
No.	Title	Length
1.	"Nice" (Eric Prydz mix)	3:28
2.	"Nice" (Eric Prydz radio mix)	3:39
3.	"Nice" (Eric Prydz radio too mix)	3:37
4.	"Nice" (Pablo La Rosa Naughty & Nice mix)	7:20
5.	"Nice" (Johnson Somerset Atomic Ice remix)	7:01
6.	"Nice" (Mike Greig So Nice mix)	3:54
7.	"Nice" (Dready mix)	3:51

== Personnel ==
Duran Duran

- Simon Le Bon – vocals
- Nick Rhodes – keyboards
- John Taylor – bass guitar
- Roger Taylor – drums
- Andy Taylor – guitar

Technical

- Don Gilmore – producer
- Duran Duran – producer
