= Astronaut (Duran Duran album) =

2004 studio album by Duran Duran

Studio album by Duran Duran
- Released: 28 September 2004
- Recorded: 2001–2004
- Studio: Sphere (London)
- Genres: Dance-pop; synth-pop; synth-funk
- Length: 49:52
- Label: Epic
- Producers: Dallas Austin; Duran Duran; Don Gilmore; Nile Rodgers; Mark Tinley

Duran Duran chronology
The Singles 1986–1995 (2004)	Astronaut (2004)	Red Carpet Massacre (2007)

Singles from Astronaut
- 1. "(Reach Up for The) Sunrise" Released: 30 August 2004; 2. "What Happens Tomorrow" Released: 18 January 2005; 3. "Nice" Released: 2005

Astronaut is the eleventh studio album by the English pop rock band Duran Duran, released on 28 September 2004 by Epic Records. It was Duran Duran's first studio album since Pop Trash (2000), and the first (and to date, last) full album since Seven and the Ragged Tiger (1983) to be recorded by the most famous five-member lineup of the band (the stand-alone 1985 single "A View to a Kill" was their last studio recording together).

Astronaut received mixed reviews from critics but was nevertheless a commercial success, peaking at number 3 on the UK Albums Chart to become the band's highest-charting album in the UK since Seven and the Ragged Tiger in 1983. The album also peaked at 17 on the U.S. Billboard 200 and reached the top ten in six other countries.

In 2021, the band signed a deal for the album with BMG (along with Medazzaland, Pop Trash and Red Carpet Massacre) which saw it being re-issued in the UK on various digital platforms.

== Critical reception ==
Professional ratings
Aggregate scores
Source	Rating
Metacritic	52/100
Review scores
Source	Rating
AllMusic	3/5 stars
The Austin Chronicle	2/5 stars
E!	A−
The Encyclopedia of Popular Music	3/5 stars
Entertainment Weekly	B
The Guardian	2/5 stars
Los Angeles Times	2.5/4 stars
NME	5/10
Rolling Stone	3/5 stars
Uncut	3/5 stars

Astronaut was met with "mixed or average" reviews from critics. At Metacritic, which assigns a weighted average rating out of 100 to reviews from mainstream publications, this release received an average score of 52 based on 17 reviews.

Upon its release, the album was well received by Billboard, stating that "Duran Duran has a new lease on life, sounding more vibrant and exciting than it has in eons". Sarah Pratt in Rolling Stone also positively reviewed the album, describing it as "feel-good pop". Doug Brod in Entertainment Weekly found "Glistening zero-gravity synth-funk that's mostly unembarrassing and at times shockingly vital", while reviews in NME and The Guardian were largely negative. Dorian Lynskey in the latter publication finding "Duran Duran are adrift in an unforgiving sea of disco-dad dance-pop, anaemic vocals and lyrics too distressingly awful to repeat in a family newspaper." Matt Dentler of The Austin Chronicle called the album an "overproduced synth shuffle", going on to say "With too many songs trying too hard, Duranies will still go hungry for quality."

In a review for AllMusic, Andy Kellman wrote: "Even with a handful of forgettable songs beyond that, the album is easily the best one credited to the Duran Duran name since 1993's Wedding Album."

== Commercial performance ==
Astronaut debuted at number three on the UK Albums Chart and at number 17 on the US Billboard 200, with similar top-20 debuts elsewhere in the world. Meanwhile, the CD/DVD set debuted at number one on the Billboard Top Music Video chart. The album peaked at number 29 in Japan.

The first single, "(Reach Up for The) Sunrise", was released in the US on 30 August 2004 and in the UK on 4 October 2004. It debuted at number five on the UK Singles Chart. In late November, it topped the Billboard Hot Dance Club Play chart.

The second single, "What Happens Tomorrow", was released on 18 January 2005 in the US and on 31 January 2005 in the UK.

Astronaut has been certified "Gold" in the UK for sales of over 100,000 copies. It was certified Gold in Italy. As of 2008, it had sold around 260,000 copies in the US.

== Track listing ==
All tracks are written by Duran Duran.

Astronaut – standard edition
No.	Title	Producer(s)	Length
1.	"(Reach Up for The) Sunrise"	Don Gilmore; Duran Duran; Jason Nevins^{[b]}; Nile Rodgers^{[a]}	3:27
2.	"Want You More!"	Duran Duran; Gilmore; Dallas Austin	3:39
3.	"What Happens Tomorrow"	Gilmore; Duran Duran	4:06
4.	"Astronaut"	Austin; Duran Duran	3:26
5.	"Bedroom Toys"	Duran Duran; Gilmore^{[b]}; Rodgers^{[b]}	3:53
6.	"Nice"	Gilmore; Duran Duran	3:28
7.	"Taste the Summer"	Duran Duran; Gilmore	3:55
8.	"Finest Hour"	Gilmore; Duran Duran	3:57
9.	"Chains"	Gilmore; Duran Duran	4:48
10.	"One of Those Days"	Austin; Duran Duran	3:47
11.	"Point of No Return"	Duran Duran; Rodgers	4:59
12.	"Still Breathing"	Duran Duran; Gilmore^{[b]}; Mark Tinley^{[c]}	5:59

Astronaut – Japanese edition bonus track
No.	Title	Length
13.	"Virus"	4:07

Notes

- ^{^[a]} signifies a vocal producer
- ^{^[b]} signifies an additional producer
- ^{^[c]} signifies a pre-production

== Personnel ==
Credits adapted from the liner notes of Astronaut.

=== Duran Duran ===
- Simon Le Bon
- Nick Rhodes
- Andy Taylor – background vocals (tracks 1, 3, 4, 10)
- John Taylor
- Roger Taylor

=== Additional musicians ===
- Mark Tinley – programming (track 12)
- Lily Gonzalez – additional percussion (tracks 3, 8, 12)
- Guy Farley – string arrangement (tracks 3, 8, 12)
- Sally Boyden – background vocals (track 1)
- Tessa Niles – background vocals (tracks 4, 5, 7)
- Jason Nevins – additional programming & production (track 1)

=== Technical ===
- Duran Duran – executive production, production
- Don Gilmore – production (tracks 1–3, 6–9); additional production (tracks 5, 12); engineering (tracks 1–3, 5–9, 12)
- Nile Rodgers – vocal production (track 1); additional production (track 5); production (track 11)
- Dallas Austin – production (tracks 2, 4, 10), engineering (tracks 4, 10)
- Mark Tinley – pre-production, engineering (track 12)
- Jeremy Wheatley – mixing at Townhouse Studios, London
- Leon Zervos – mastering at Sterling Sound, New York City
- Rich Hilton – Pro Tools, engineering (track 11)
- Daniel Mendez – Pro Tools, additional engineering (tracks 1–3, 5–9, 12)
- Rick Sheppard – Pro Tools, additional engineering (tracks 4, 10)
- Francesco Cameli – engineering assistance (tracks 1–3, 5–9, 12)
- Richard Edgeler – engineering assistance (tracks 4, 10)
- Dean Barratt – engineering assistance (track 11)
- Jason Nevins – additional recording (track 1)

=== Artwork ===
- Kristian Schuller – cover photography
- Richard Haughton – guitar photography
- FAILE – art
- Clarissa Tossin – art
- Sean Hogan – art
- Bernie Beca – art
- Patty Palazzo – art
- John Warwicker – creative direction, graphics remix
- Sara Syms – graphic art

== Charts ==
Chart performance for Astronaut
Chart (2004)	Peak position
Australian Albums (ARIA)	22
Austrian Albums (Ö3 Austria)	27
Belgian Albums (Ultratop Flanders)	40
Belgian Albums (Ultratop Wallonia)	35
Canadian Albums (Billboard)	9
Czech Albums (ČNS IFPI)	53
Danish Albums (Hitlisten)	8
Dutch Albums (Album Top 100)	17
European Albums (Billboard)	4
French Albums (SNEP)	87
German Albums (Offizielle Top 100)	23
Greek International Albums (IFPI)	6
Irish Albums (IRMA)	38
Italian Albums (FIMI)	2
New Zealand Albums (RMNZ)	29
Scottish Albums (Official Charts)	5
Swedish Albums (Sverigetopplistan)	41
Swiss Albums (Schweizer Hitparade)	21
UK Albums (Official Charts)	3
US Billboard 200	17

== Certifications ==
Certifications for Astronaut
Region	Certification	Certified units/sales
United Kingdom (BPI)	Gold	100,000^{^}
^{^} Shipments figures based on certification alone.

== Release history ==
Release history for Astronaut
Region	Date	Format	Label	Catalog
United States	28 September 2004	LP	Epic	E2 92900
United Kingdom	11 October 2004	CD	Epic	517920 8
United Kingdom	11 October 2004	CD+DVD	Epic	EPC 517920 3
United States	12 October 2004	CD	Epic	EK 92900
United States	12 October 2004	CD+DVD	Epic	EK 93463
South Korea	15 October 2004	CD	Sony	CPK 3348 (517920.6)
South Korea	15 October 2004	Cassette	Sony	CPT-3348 (517920.4)
Japan	20 October 2004	CD	Sony	EICP 426
Japan	20 October 2004	CD+DVD	Sony	EICP-424-5
United States	29 March 2005	DualDisc	Epic	EN 93512
United States	20 December 2005	SACD	Epic	82876761752
