= What Happens Tomorrow =

2005 single by Duran Duran

Single by Duran Duran

from the album Astronaut
- B-side: "Silent Icy River"
- Released: 18 January 2005
- Studio: Sphere (London)
- Length: 4:04
- Label: Epic
- Songwriters: Simon Le Bon; John Taylor; Roger Taylor; Andy Taylor; Nick Rhodes
- Producers: Duran Duran; Don Gilmore

Duran Duran singles chronology
"(Reach Up for The) Sunrise" (2004)	"What Happens Tomorrow" (2005)	"Nice" (2005)

Music video
- "What Happens Tomorrow" on YouTube

"What Happens Tomorrow" is a song by the English pop rock band Duran Duran from their 11th studio album, Astronaut (2004). It was released on 18 January 2005 as the second single from that album. The song peaked at number 11 on the UK singles chart on 6 February 2005 and was the second single from the album to peak at number two in Italy.

== Music video ==
The video, which showed the band as constellations, was directed by the duo Smith n' Borin (Frank Borin and Ryan Smith). It was nominated on the Visual Effects Society Awards 2005 for "Outstanding Visual Effects in a Music Video" for media artists Jerry Steele, Jo Steele, Brian Adler and Monique Eissing. Playboy Playmate Nicole Marie Lenz and Steve Talley (American Pie Presents: The Naked Mile) appear in the video.

== Track listings ==
CD: Epic / 6756501 (UK)

1. "What Happens Tomorrow" – 4:04
2. "(Reach Up for The) Sunrise" (Eric Prydz edit) – 3:36
- The full-length mix was released on a promotional 12 inch during the "Sunrise" campaign.

CD: Epic / 6756502 (UK)

1. "What Happens Tomorrow" – 4:04
2. "Silent Icy River" – 2:54
3. "What Happens Tomorrow" (Harry Peat mix) – 4:04
4. "What Happens Tomorrow" (video) – 4:04

CD: Epic / 6756532 (International)

1. "What Happens Tomorrow" – 4:04
2. "Silent Icy River" – 2:54
3. "What Happens Tomorrow" (Harry Peat mix) – 4:04
4. "(Reach Up for The) Sunrise" (Eric Prydz mix) – 6:46

== Personnel ==
- Simon Le Bon – vocals
- Nick Rhodes – keyboards
- John Taylor – bass guitar
- Roger Taylor – drums
- Andy Taylor – guitar

== Charts ==
=== Weekly charts ===
Weekly chart performance for "What Happens Tomorrow"
Chart (2005)	Peak position
Belgium (Ultratip Bubbling Under Flanders)	8
Canada Hot AC Top 30 (Radio & Records)	15
CIS Airplay (TopHit)	13
Germany (GfK)	80
Ireland (IRMA)	47
Italy (FIMI)	2
Romania (Romanian Top 100)	39
Russia Airplay (TopHit)	10
Scotland Singles (Official Charts)	15
UK Singles (Official Charts)	11
US Dance Club Songs (Billboard)	2

=== Year-end charts ===
Year-end chart performance for "What Happens Tomorrow"
Chart (2005)	Position
CIS Airplay (TopHit)	33
Italy (FIMI)	49
Russia Airplay (TopHit)	25
US Dance Club Play (Billboard)	41

== Release history ==
Release dates and formats for "What Happens Tomorrow"
Region	Date	Format(s)	Label(s)	Ref.
United States	18 January 2005	Hot adult contemporary radio	Epic	
United Kingdom	31 January 2005	CD	Epic	
