= (Reach Up for The) Sunrise =

2004 single by Duran Duran

Single by Duran Duran

from the album Astronaut
- B-side: "Know It All"
- Released: 30 August 2004
- Studio: Sphere (London)
- Genre: House
- Length: 3:27
- Label: Epic
- Songwriters: Simon Le Bon; John Taylor; Roger Taylor; Andy Taylor; Nick Rhodes
- Producers: Duran Duran; Don Gilmore; Jason Nevins^{[a]}

Duran Duran singles chronology
"Last Day on Earth" (2001)	"(Reach Up for The) Sunrise" (2004)	"What Happens Tomorrow" (2005)

Music video
- "(Reach Up for The) Sunrise" on YouTube

"(Reach Up for The) Sunrise" is a song by the English pop rock band Duran Duran. It was released as the lead single from their eleventh studio album, Astronaut (2004) and their 31st single overall. It was the first single since "A View to a Kill" in 1985 to feature all five of the original members of the band. The song was sent to US radio on 30 August 2004 and was issued physically over the following few months.

Upon its release, "Sunrise" debuted and peaked at number five on the UK Singles Chart, giving the band their 14th top-10 hit in their native country. It was highly successful in Italy, where it reached number two, as well as in Denmark and Spain, peaking at number six in both countries. In the United States, the single topped the Billboard Dance Club Songs chart, Duran Duran's third and last song to do so.

== Composition ==
Upon its release, Simon Le Bon described it as a "dancefloor song that says everything about the band, about saying goodbye to the darkness and hello to the light." One reviewer found the song related to Duran Duran's 1981 hit "Planet Earth"; "sharing the same minor key and armed with a similar, Velcro-coated chorus."

== Chart performance ==
"Sunrise" peaked at number five on the UK Singles Chart in October 2004 and reached number one on the US Billboard Hot Dance Music/Club Play chart on 4 December 2004. The Jason Nevins newly produced version is the main version of the song. It marked the band's first top ten in the UK since "Ordinary World" and their highest-charting single since "A View to a Kill, even though its chart stay was only four weeks. Elsewhere, the song reached number six in Denmark and Spain and number two in Italy, where it became the soundtrack of a telephone advertising campaign.

== Music video ==
The video was directed by Michael and Mark Polish (aka the Polish Brothers), and featured each band member on their own journey across various landscapes, only to be joined together on a stage before an intense sunrise for the chorus.

Each band member's storyline was filmed in a different film or digital format, creating a very different look for each set of scenes. Several versions of the video were made available on the Internet, with each version focusing on the storyline of one band member.

The band plays the Jason Nevins version live in concert. Nevins has co-production credit, to which he is credited in the liner notes on the album.

== Track listings ==
UK CD1 and European CD single

1. "(Reach Up for The) Sunrise" (album version) – 3:24
2. "(Reach Up for The) Sunrise" (Alex G Cosmic mix) – 5:44

UK CD2

1. "(Reach Up for The) Sunrise" (album version) – 3:24
2. "(Reach Up for The) Sunrise" (Jason Nevins radio mix) – 4:15
3. "(Reach Up for The) Sunrise" (Ferry Corsten dub mix) – 7:25
4. "Know It All" – 2:30
5. "(Reach Up for The) Sunrise" (video) – 3:24

German mini-CD single

1. "(Reach Up for The) Sunrise" – 3:24
2. "(Reach Up for The) Sunrise" (Peter Presta NY tribal mix) – 5:55

US CD single

1. "(Reach Up for The) Sunrise"
2. "Know It All"

Australian CD single

1. "(Reach Up for The) Sunrise"
2. "(Reach Up for The) Sunrise" (Alex G Cosmic mix)
3. "(Reach Up for The) Sunrise" (Ferry Corsten dub mix)
4. "(Reach Up for The) Sunrise" (Peter Presta NY tribal mix)
5. "Know It All"

== Personnel ==
Duran Duran

- Simon Le Bon – vocals
- Nick Rhodes – keyboards
- John Taylor – bass
- Andy Taylor – guitar, backing vocals
- Roger Taylor – drums

Additional musicians

- Sally Boyden – backing vocals

Production

- Don Gilmore – producer, engineer
- Duran Duran – producer
- Nile Rodgers – vocal producer
- Jason Nevins – additional producer, programming, engineer, mixer
- Jeremy Wheatley – mixing
- Daniel Mendez – engineer
- Francesco Cameli – assistant engineer
- Leon Zervos – mastering

Notes

- ^{^[a]} signifies an additional producer

== Charts ==
=== Weekly charts ===
Weekly chart performance for "(Reach Up for The) Sunrise"
Chart (2004–2005)	Peak position
Australia (ARIA)	22
Austria (Ö3 Austria Top 40)	50
Belgium (Ultratop 50 Flanders)	42
Belgium (Ultratip Bubbling Under Wallonia)	3
Canada AC Top 30 (Radio & Records)	22
Canada Hot AC Top 30 (Radio & Records)	5
Denmark (Tracklisten)	6
Europe (Eurochart Hot 100)	9
Germany (GfK)	39
Hungary (Rádiós Top 40)	1
Hungary (Dance Top 40)	18
Ireland (IRMA)	32
Italy (FIMI)	2
Netherlands (Dutch Tipparade 40)	4
Netherlands (Single Top 100)	25
New Zealand (Recorded Music NZ)	37
Romania (Romanian Top 100)	72
Scotland Singles (Official Charts)	7
Spain (Promusicae)	6
Spain Airplay (Top 40 Radio)	7
Switzerland (Schweizer Hitparade)	61
UK Singles (Official Charts)	5
US Billboard Hot 100	89
US Adult Pop Airplay (Billboard)	13
US Dance Club Songs (Billboard)	1
US Dance Airplay (Billboard)	11

=== Year-end charts ===
2004 year-end chart performance for "(Reach Up for The) Sunrise"
Chart (2004)	Position
Hungary (Rádiós Top 40)	50
Italy (FIMI)	26
UK Singles (OCC)	181
US Adult Top 40 (Billboard)	50

2005 year-end chart performance for "(Reach Up for The) Sunrise"
Chart (2005)	Position
Hungary (Rádiós Top 40)	10
US Adult Top 40 (Billboard)	71

== Release history ==
Release dates and formats for "(Reach Up for The) Sunrise"
Region	Date	Format(s)	Label(s)	Ref.
United States	30 August 2004	Hot adult contemporary radio	Epic	
Australia	20 September 2004	CD	Epic	
Denmark	20 September 2004	CD	Epic	
United Kingdom	4 October 2004	CD	Epic	
United Kingdom	4 October 2004	Digital download	Epic	

== Covers, samples, and media references ==
At the end of an episode of Las Vegas, the band appeared, performing the song in the Montecito as was normal during the second season.

As of 2005, the Jason Nevins-produced version of the song is used in the beginning sequence of the television programme Sunrise on Seven Network in Australia. It was also used in Telecom Italia Mobile commercials with Adriana Lima, and also appeared on an episode of Queer Eye for the Straight Guy as well as the television soundtrack, released on Capitol Records.

The Jason Nevins club mix was featured in the 2007 arcade game Dance Dance Revolution SuperNova 2.

== See also ==
- List of Billboard Hot Dance Club Play number ones of 2004
