= List of awards and nominations received by Duran Duran =

Duran Duran awards and nominations
Awards and nominations
Award	Wins	Nominations
American Music Awards	0	1
Billboard	0	6
Brit	2	0
Golden Globe	0	1
Grammy	2	5
Ivor Novello	3	4
MTV Europe	1	0
MTV VMA	1	4
Q	2	0
UK MVA	0	2

Totals (Note: Certain award groups do not simply award one winner. They acknowledge several different recipients, have runners-up, and have third place. Since this is a specific recognition and is different from losing an award, runner-up mentions are considered wins in this award tally. For simplification and to avoid errors, each award in this list has been presumed to have had a prior nomination.)
- Wins: 42
- Nominations: 34

Duran Duran are a Grammy Award-winning English rock band from Birmingham, United Kingdom. They were one of the most successful of the 1980s bands and a leading band in the MTV-driven "Second British Invasion" of the United States. Since the 1980s they have placed 14 in the Top 10 of the UK Singles Chart and 21 in the US Billboard Hot 100 and have sold more than 100 million records.

== ASCAP Pop Music Awards ==
The ASCAP Pop Music Awards honors the songwriters and publishers of the most performed pop songs.

Year	Nominee / work	Award	Result	Ref.
1994	"Ordinary World"	Most Performed Songs	Won	
1994	"Come Undone"	Most Performed Songs	Won	

== American Music Awards ==
The American Music Awards is an annual awards ceremony created by Dick Clark in 1973. Duran Duran has been nominated once overall at the American Music Awards.

Year	Nominee / work	Award	Result
1985	Themselves	Favorite Group Video Artist Pop, Rock, Band, or Duo	Nominated

== BT Digital Music Awards ==
Launched in 2002, the BT Digital Music Awards were held annually in the United Kingdom.

Year	Nominee / work	Award	Result
2004	Duran Duran's official site	Best Music Website	Nominated

== Billboard Music Awards ==
The Billboard Music Awards are held to honor artists for commercial performance in the US, based on record charts published by Billboard.

Year	Nominee / work	Award	Result	Ref.
1983	Themselves	Top Pop Artist	Nominated	
1983	Themselves	Top Duo/Group	Nominated	
1983	Themselves	Top Pop Albums Artist	Nominated	
1983	Themselves	Top Pop Albums Artist – Duo/Group	Nominated	
1983	Themselves	Top Pop Singles Artist	Nominated	
1983	Themselves	Top Pop Singles Artist – Duo/Group	Nominated	

== Bravo Otto Awards ==
The Bravo Otto Awards are held by Bravo magazine, the largest teen magazine within the German-language sphere, to honor top performers in film, music, television and sport.

Year	Nominee / work	Award	Result
1985	Themselves	Best Group (Silver)	Won

== Brit Awards ==
The Brit Awards are the British Phonographic Industry's annual pop music awards. Duran Duran has won two award from two nominations.

Year	Nominee / work	Award	Result
1985	"The Wild Boys"	Best British Video	Won
2004	Themselves	Outstanding Contribution to Music	Won

== Classic Pop Readers' Awards ==
Classic Pop is a monthly British music magazine, which launched in October 2012. It was devised and founded by Ian Peel, who was also editor for the first 19 issues. Rik Flynn stepped in as editor until Issue 23 followed by current editor Steve Harnell. Ian Peel remains involved as Founder & Editor-at-Large.

Year	Nominee / work	Award	Result
2020	Themselves	Group of the Year	Nominated

== GAFFA Awards (Denmark) ==
Year	Nominee / work	Award	Result	Ref.
2022	Themselves	International Band	Pending	
2022	Future Past	International Album	Pending	

== Golden Globe Awards ==
The Golden Globe Awards are awarded annually by the Hollywood Foreign Press Association. Duran Duran has received one nomination.

Year	Nominee / work	Award	Result
1986	"A View to a Kill" from A View to a Kill	Best Original Song	Nominated

== Grammy Awards ==
The Grammy Awards are awarded annually by the National Academy of Recording Arts and Sciences. Duran Duran has received two awards from five nominations.

Year	Nominee / work	Award	Result
1984	"Girls on Film" / "Hungry Like the Wolf"	Best Music Video, Short Form	Won
1984	Duran Duran	Best Music Video, Long Form	Won

Year	Nominee / work	Award	Result
2008	"Falling Down"	Best Adult Contemporary Video	Nominated
2008	"Falling Down"	Best Colorist/Telecine	Nominated

2026 Grammy Award nomination “Best Recording Package” -"Danse Macabre: De Luxe"

== Hollywood Walk of Fame ==
Year	Nominee / work	Award	Result
1993	Themselves	Hollywood Walk of Fame	Inducted

== IM&MC Music Video Awards ==
The IM&MC Music Video Awards were clip competition awards presented to winners during the telecast, marking the closing of the first International Music&Media Conference (IM&MC). The show was carried live by the BBC and the UK-based Music Box network, and was tapped for later presentation on MTV in the US and MuchMusic in Canada.

Year	Nominee / work	Award	Result	Ref.
1986	Arena	Best Story Line – Long-form Video	Won	

== Ivor Novello Awards ==
The Ivor Novello Awards is an award ceremony for songwriting and composing, held annually in London, United Kingdom.

Year	Nominee / work	Award	Result
1985	"The Reflex"	International Hit of the Year	Won
1986	"A View to a Kill"	International Hit of the Year	Nominated
1986	"A View to a Kill"	The Best Film Theme or Song	Nominated
1994	"Ordinary World"	International Hit of the Year	Nominated
1994	"Ordinary World"	Best Song Musically and Lyrically	Nominated
1994	"Ordinary World"	Most Performed Work	Won
2005	Themselves	Outstanding Contribution to Music	Won

== Lunas del Auditorio ==
Lunas del Auditorio are sponsored by the National Auditorium in Mexico to honor the best live shows in the country.

Year	Nominee / work	Award	Result
2005	Themselves	Best Foreign Rock Artist	Nominated
2011	Themselves	Best Foreign Rock Artist	Nominated
2017	Themselves	Best Foreign Rock Artist	Nominated

== MTV Europe Music Awards ==
The MTV Europe Music Awards is an annual awards ceremony established in 1994 by MTV Europe.

Year	Nominee / work	Award	Result
2015	Themselves	Video Visionary Award	Won

== MTV Video Music Awards ==
The MTV Video Music Awards is an annual awards ceremony established in 1984 by MTV.

Year	Nominee / work	Award	Result
1984	"The Reflex"	Best Editing in a Video	Nominated
1984	"The Reflex"	Best Stage Performance in a Video	Nominated
1985	"The Wild Boys"	Best Direction in a Video	Nominated
1993	"Ordinary World"	Best Cinematography in a Video	Nominated
2003	Themselves	Lifetime Achievement Award	Won

== Music Video Production Awards ==
The MVPA Awards are annually presented by a Los Angeles-based music trade organization to honor the year's best music videos.

== Pollstar Concert Industry Awards ==
The Pollstar Concert Industry Awards is an annual award ceremony to honor artists and professionals in the concert industry.

Year	Nominee / work	Award	Result
1988	The Strange Behavior Tour	Most Creative Stage Production	Nominated
1989	The Secret Caravan Club Tour	Club Tour of the Year	Nominated

== Premios Ondas ==
The Premios Ondas have been given since 1954 by Radio Barcelona, a subsidiary of Cadena SER, in recognition of professionals in the fields of radio and television broadcasting, the cinema, and the music industry.

Year	Nominee / work	Award	Result
2004	Themselves	Special Jury Award	Won

== Q Awards ==
Q was a monthly music magazine from the UK, where Duran Duran won a Lifetime Achievement Award.

Year	Nominee / work	Award	Result
2003	Themselves	Q Lifetime Achievement Award	Won
2015	Themselves	Q Icon Award	Won

== Rock and Roll Hall of Fame ==
The Rock and Roll Hall of Fame is a museum located on the shores of Lake Erie in downtown Cleveland, Ohio, United States, dedicated to the recording history of some of the best-known and most influential artists, producers, and other people who have influenced the music industry.

Year	Nominee / work	Award	Result	Ref.
2022	Themselves	Hall of Fame	Inducted	

== Silver Clef Awards ==
The Silver Clef Awards are an annual UK music awards lunch which has been running since 1976. Duran Duran has received one award.

Year	Nominee / work	Award	Result
2015	Themselves	Silver Clef Award	Won

== Smash Hits Poll Winners Party ==
The Smash Hits Poll Winners Party (1988–2005) was an awards ceremony held annually by British magazine Smash Hits, and broadcast on BBC One.

Year	Nominee / work	Award	Result
1981	Themselves	Best Group	Nominated
1981	"Girls on Film"	Best Single	Nominated
1981	Simon Le Bon	Most Fanciable Male	Nominated
1982	Simon Le Bon	Most Fanciable Male	Won
1982	Simon Le Bon	Best Male Singer	Won
1982	Rio	Best Album	Won
1982	"Save a Prayer"	Best Single	Won
1982	"Hungry Like the Wolf"	Best Single	Nominated
1983	Themselves	Best Group	Won
1983	"Union of the Snake"	Best Video	Won
1983	Simon Le Bon	Best Male Singer	Won
1983	John Taylor	Most Fanciable Male	Won
1983	Villa Park show 1983	Event of The Year	Won
1984	Themselves	Worst Group	Nominated
1984	Themselves	Best Group	Won
1984	Seven and the Ragged Tiger	Best Album	Won
1984	"The Wild Boys"	Best Single	Won
1984	"The Wild Boys"	Best Video	Won
1984	Simon Le Bon	Best Male Singer	Won
1984	John Taylor	Most Fanciable Male	Won
1984	Roger Taylor Wedding	Event of The Year	Won
1985	Themselves	Best Group	Won
1985	"A View to a Kill"	Best Single	Won
1985	Simon Le Bon	Best Male Singer	Won
1985	John Taylor	Most Fanciable Male	Won
1985	John Taylor	Best Dressed Person	Won
1986	Themselves	Worst Group	Nominated
1986	"Notorious"	Best Single	Won
1986	John Taylor	Most Fanciable Male	Won
1987	Themselves	Worst Group	Nominated

== UK Music Video Awards ==
The UK Music Video Awards is an annual award ceremony founded in 2008 to recognise creativity, technical excellence and innovation in music videos and moving images for music.

Year	Nominee / work	Award	Result
2011	"Before the Rain"	Best Pop Video – Budget	Nominated
2012	"Girl Panic"	Best Styling in a Video	Nominated
