= Duran Duran =

English rock band

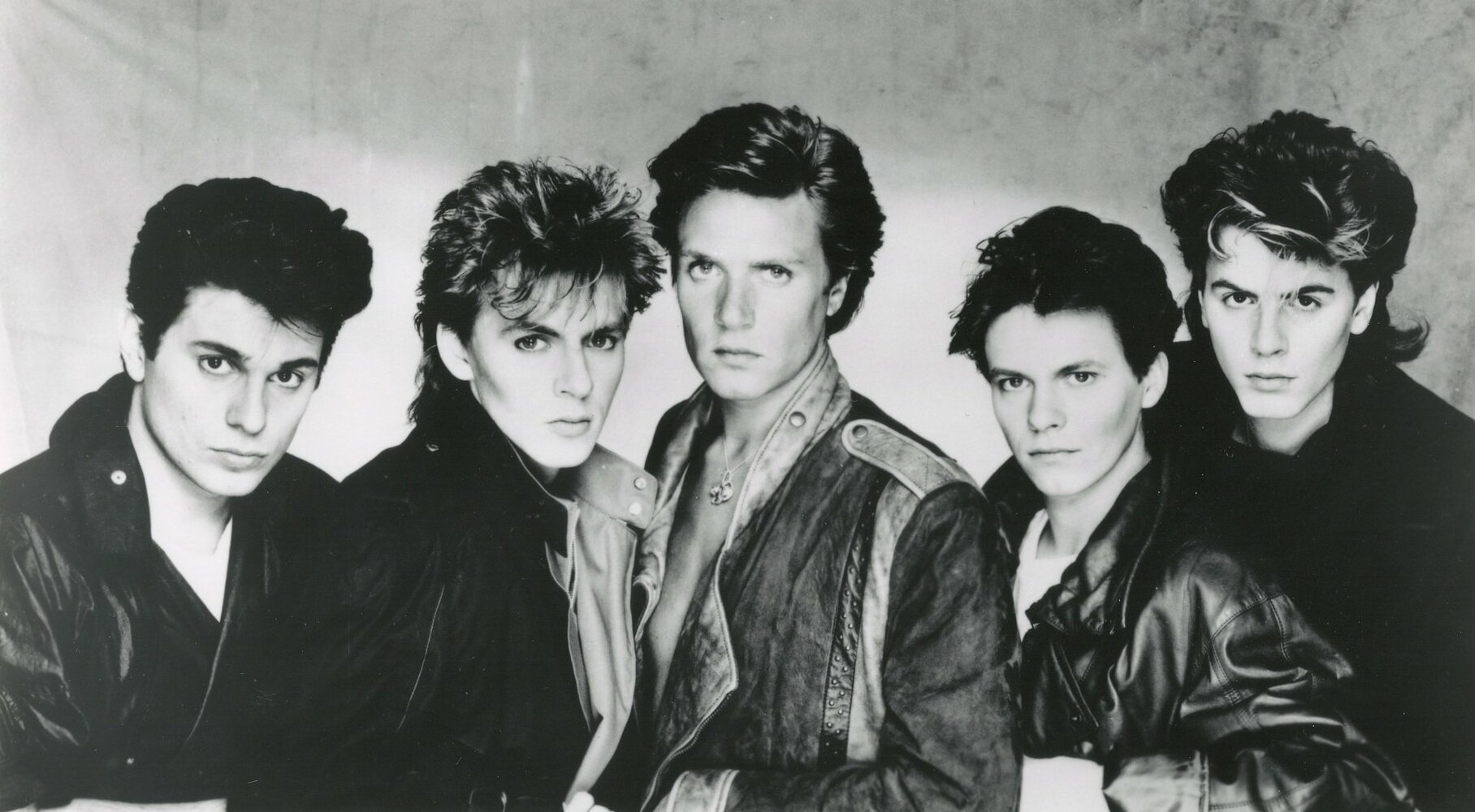
- Duran Duran in 1983 (L–R): Roger Taylor (drums), Nick Rhodes (keyboards), Simon Le Bon (vocals), Andy Taylor (guitar) and John Taylor (bass)

Background information
- Origin: Birmingham, England
- Genres: New wave; synth-pop; pop rock; dance-rock
- Works: Discography; songs
- Years active: 1978–present
- Labels: Capitol; EMI; Parlophone; Virgin; Epic; Hollywood; Tapemodern; Warner Bros.; BMG
- Spinoffs: Arcadia; The Power Station; Neurotic Outsiders; The Devils; TV Mania
- Members: Nick Rhodes; John Taylor; Simon Le Bon
- Past members: Stephen Duffy; Simon Colley; Andy Wickett; Alan Curtis; Jeff Thomas; Roger Taylor; Andy Taylor; Warren Cuccurullo; Sterling Campbell
- Website: duranduran.com

Duran Duran (/djʊˌræn djʊˈræn/) are an English pop rock band. Formed in Birmingham in 1978 by keyboardist Nick Rhodes, guitarist (later bassist) John Taylor and singer/bassist Stephen Duffy. The band went through several early changes before the band's line-up settled in May 1980 as Rhodes, Taylor, singer Simon Le Bon, guitarist Andy Taylor and drummer Roger Taylor. (Note: None of the three Taylors are related to each other, nor to Queen drummer Roger Taylor.)

Emerging as one of the most successful bands of the New Romantic scene in the early 1980s, they were innovators of the music video and a leading band in the MTV-driven Second British Invasion of the US. By 1984, the band had achieved a level of popularity likened to Beatlemania. The band's first hit was "Planet Earth", which peaked at no. 12 in early 1981. That summer, they achieved a Top 5 hit with "Girls on Film", the popularity of which was enhanced by a controversial music video. Both tracks were taken from their 1981 self-titled debut album, which reached no. 3 and went Platinum in the UK. The band's second album, Rio (1982), went on to greater success and became a worldwide hit. The songs "Hungry Like the Wolf", "Save a Prayer" and "Rio" featured cinematic music videos directed by Australian filmmaker Russell Mulcahy and became three of their biggest hits. In 1983, the band scored their first UK number one single with "Is There Something I Should Know?". Their third album, Seven and the Ragged Tiger, became their first and only UK number one album. A remix of "The Reflex" became a US and UK number one single. In 1985, the band topped the US charts with the single "A View to a Kill" from the soundtrack of the James Bond film of the same title.

Andy Taylor and Roger Taylor both left the band before the recording of their fourth album, Notorious (1986), which yielded the top ten title track. Le Bon, Rhodes and John Taylor initially continued as a core trio, before adding guitarist Warren Cuccurullo and drummer Sterling Campbell as full-time members in 1989, though Campbell departed in 1991. The band's records in the late 1980s and early 1990s found only moderate success. However, their 1993 album Duran Duran (commonly called The Wedding Album), featured two top ten worldwide hits "Ordinary World" and "Come Undone". John Taylor left the band in 1997, though four years later, in 2001, a full reunion of the classic 1980–1985 line-up of Le Bon, Rhodes and all three Taylors took place, which led to a number of highly successful concert tours and the 2004 album Astronaut, which reached number three in the UK and top 40 in numerous other countries. The album's lead single "(Reach Up for The) Sunrise" was an international dance hit, and reached number five in the UK. Andy Taylor left again in 2006, and the band have since released five albums, with the most recent being Danse Macabre in 2023. Roger Taylor announced his departure and retirement in 2026.

According to Billboard, Duran Duran have sold over 100 million records. They achieved 30 top 40 singles in the UK singles chart (14 of them top 10) and 21 top 40 singles in the US Billboard Hot 100. In the UK, they have achieved consistent success on the albums chart with top five albums in five consecutive decades. The band have won numerous awards throughout their career: two Brit Awards including the 2004 award for Outstanding Contribution to Music, two Grammy Awards, an MTV Video Music Award for Lifetime Achievement and a Video Visionary Award from the MTV Europe Music Awards. They were also awarded a star on the Hollywood Walk of Fame. The band were inducted into the Rock and Roll Hall of Fame in 2022.

== History ==
=== 1978–1980: Formation and early years ===
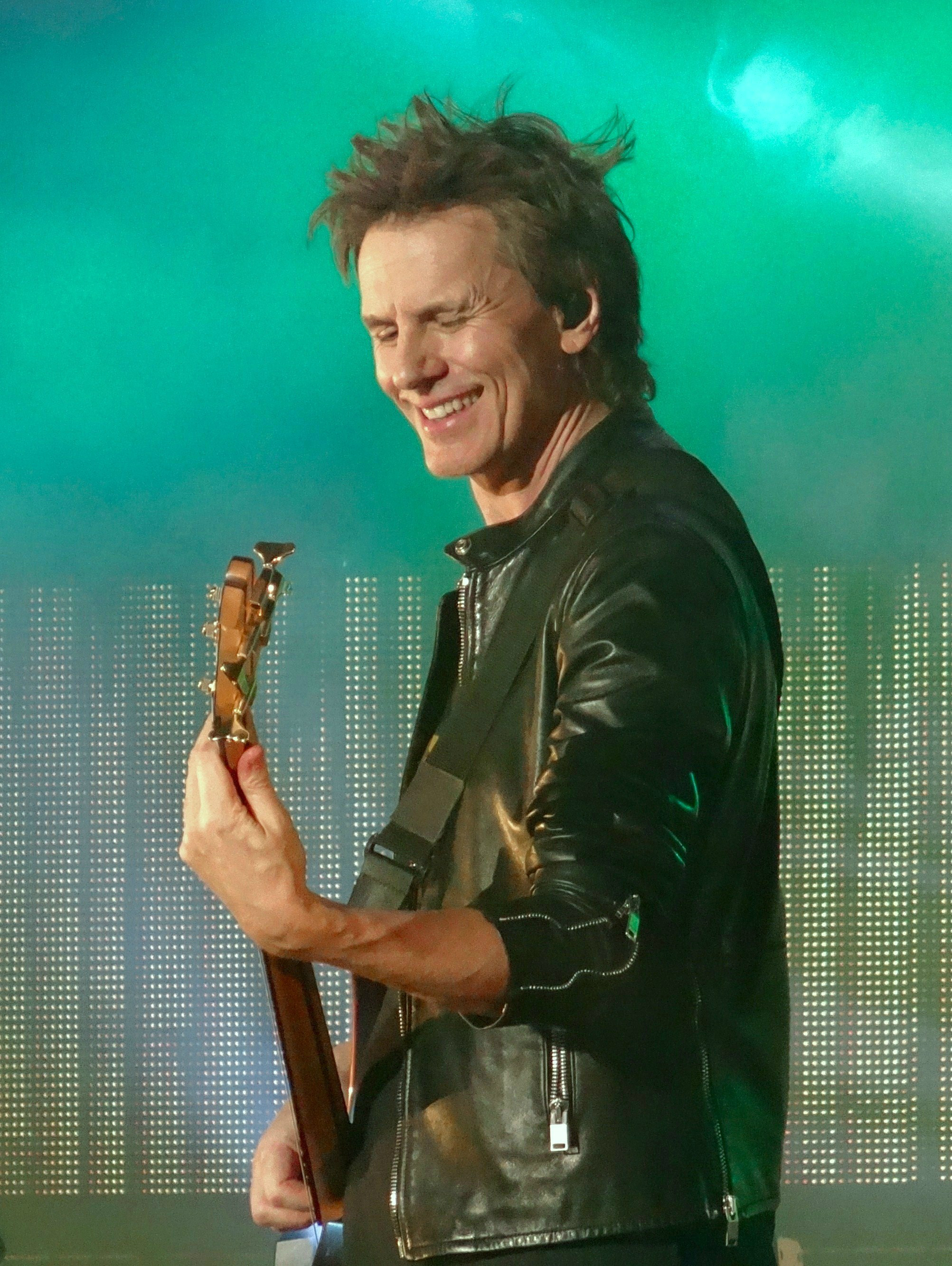
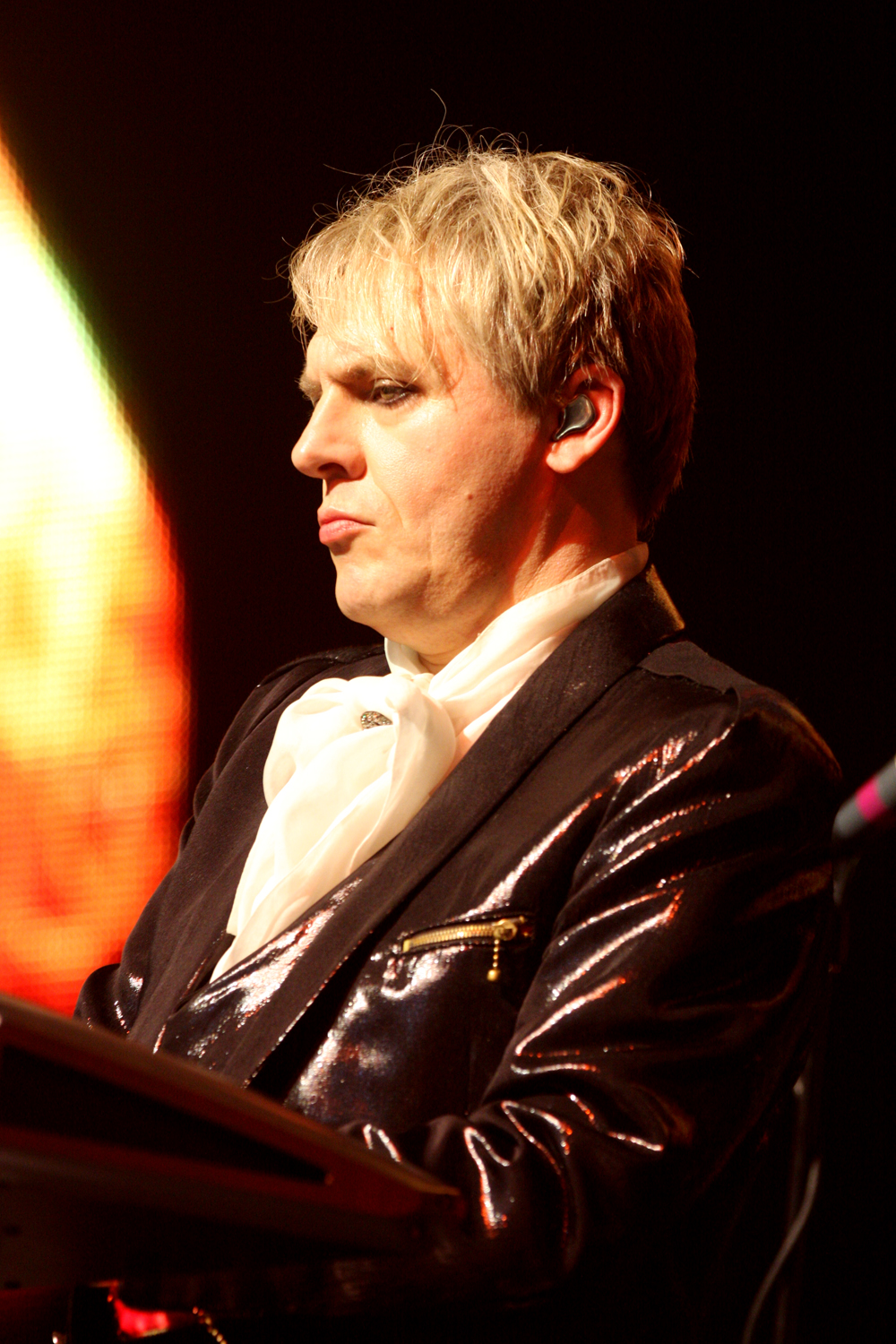
John Taylor (left, in 2015) and Nick Rhodes (in 2012) founded Duran Duran in 1978.

Childhood friends John Taylor and Nick Rhodes formed Duran Duran in 1978 in Birmingham, England, together with Taylor's art school friend Stephen Duffy, naming their band after "Dr. Durand Durand", Milo O'Shea's character from the science fiction film Barbarella (1968), the day after the film was broadcast on BBC on 20 October 1978. The three of them (Taylor on guitar and vocals, Rhodes on synthesizer and tapes, Duffy on vocals and bass) played their first gig on 5 April 1979 at the Birmingham Polytechnic. Soon after, they were joined by Simon Colley on clarinet and bass. John (then going by his first name Nigel) Taylor was the guitarist at this point. After a few gigs, including a performance at Barbarella's in Birmingham opening for the band Fashion, Duffy and Colley left the band in June 1979.

Taylor and Rhodes then recruited lead vocalist Andy Wickett (formerly frontman of TV Eye) and decided that they needed a live drummer. They hired Roger Taylor, a former member of various local bands (most recently The Scent Organs who also played at Barbarella's), while John Taylor switched to bass guitar. In September 1979, this incarnation of the band recorded a four-track demo including an early version of "Girls on Film" co-written by Andy Wickett. Soon afterwards Alan Curtis was recruited as lead guitarist. After a few gigs with this line-up Wickett left the band in late 1979.

Wickett was replaced by Roger Taylor's friend and former singer of The Scent Organs Jeff Thomas. In early 1980, they became the resident band at the city's Rum Runner nightclub.They worked at the club and regularly rehearsed and performed there. Curtis was unhappy with the Rum Runner club scene and left the band to form Dif Juz with his brother. Thomas was fired shortly after following disagreements and repeated arguments. The three remaining members started to look for a new lead vocalist and guitarist. The owners of the club, brothers Paul and Michael Berrow, became the band's management, paying them to work as doormen, disc jockeys (DJs) and barmen when they were not rehearsing, and also formed the Tritec Music company.

In April 1980, guitarist Andy Taylor came from Newcastle upon Tyne to audition after responding to an advertisement in Melody Maker. Andy already had a lot of experience from playing with cover bands for years and although he came from a totally different rock music background his versatile playing style was seen as a perfect complement to the band. In May 1980, London vocalist and drama student Simon Le Bon was recommended to the band by an ex-girlfriend who worked at the Rum Runner. The band were immediately impressed by Le Bon and soon completed their first composition with the new line-up, "Sound of Thunder", featuring lyrics by Le Bon. Duran Duran's first performance with the lineup of Le Bon, Rhodes and the three Taylors was on 16 July 1980 at the Rum Runner.

Duran Duran spent the next months writing, developing and demoing their songs and performed in clubs around Birmingham and London. In September 1980 they had written all of what would become their debut album. Touring as an opening act for Hazel O'Connor, the band attracted critical attention, resulting in a bidding war between the record companies EMI and Phonogram. "A certain patriotism" toward the label of the Beatles led them to sign with EMI in December. A week later, the first article about Duran Duran in a national magazine appeared in Sounds. The members of Duran Duran had noticed that Betty Page (pen name for Beverley Glick) was writing about a new movement called New Romantic that would fit the band perfectly and invited her to meet them at the Rum Runner.

Shortly after signing the recording contract with EMI, Duran Duran went to London to record their debut album with producer Colin Thurston, and initial plans for an independent release of the songs "Planet Earth" and "Is There Anyone Out There?" on the Tritec Music label were scrapped.

=== 1981–1982: Self-titled debut, Rio and Second British Invasion ===
The band's debut album, Duran Duran, was released on the EMI label in June 1981. The first single, "Planet Earth", had reached the United Kingdom's top 20 at number 12 in February. A follow-up, "Careless Memories", released in April, stalled at number 37. The third single, "Girls on Film", was released in July and went to number 5 in the UK. The video, featuring topless women mud wrestling, pillow fighting and stylised depictions of other sexual fetishes, was made with directing duo Godley & Creme in August. The video was filmed just two weeks after MTV was launched in the United States. The band expected the "Girls on Film" video to be played in the newer nightclubs that had video screens or on pay TV channels like the Playboy Channel. Kevin Godley explained the thinking behind it:

We were very explicitly told by Duran Duran's management to make a very sensational and erotic piece that would be for clubs, where it would get shown uncensored just to make people take notice and talk about it.

The video was heavily edited for MTV. The album also included "Tel Aviv", a track with lyrics Simon Le Bon wrote in 1980 after working on a kibbutz in Israel. The song was later reworked into a Middle Eastern-influenced instrumental before appearing on the album.The album peaked in the UK top twenty at number three. Later in 1981 the band embarked on their first United States club tour followed by more dates in Germany and the UK. This second tour of Britain coincided with a wave of riots sparked by unemployment and racial tension, including those of Moss Side and Toxteth. The band played Birmingham the day after the Handsworth riots. The band also began writing and demoing songs for a new album. In November 1981, they released a new single, the disco-influenced "My Own Way", that reached number 14 in the UK, followed in early 1982 by the recording of their second album at AIR Studios in London.

In May 1982, Duran Duran released their second album, Rio, which entered the UK Albums Chart at number four and peaked at number two the following week. The band scored three UK top 10 hits on the singles chart from the album with "Hungry Like the Wolf" at number five in June, "Save a Prayer" at number two in September and the title song "Rio" at number nine in December, while the earlier top 20 hit "My Own Way" was included in a re-recorded version on the album.

With the album Duran Duran also began to achieve worldwide recognition. A headlining tour of Australia, Japan and the US was followed by a stint supporting Blondie during that band's final American tour. Diana, Princess of Wales declared Duran Duran her favourite band, and the band were dubbed "the Fab Five" by the British press, comparing them to the Beatles whose nickname was the Fab Four.

At first, the Rio album did not do well in the United States. EMI in the UK had promoted Duran Duran as a New Romantic band, but the New Romantic movement was barely known in the US, and EMI's American subsidiary Capitol Records was at a loss about how to sell them. After Carnival (an EP of Rio's dance remixes) became popular with DJs in the autumn, the band arranged to have most of the album remixed by David Kershenbaum. In June 1982, Duran Duran appeared for the first time on American television, performing "Hungry Like the Wolf" and "Rio" on Dancin' on Air, the forerunner to the national hit show Dance Party USA.

Now promoted as a dance album, Rio was re-released in the US in November and began to climb the American charts six months after its European success. MTV placed "Hungry Like the Wolf" and several other Duran Duran videos into heavy rotation, pushing the single and album into the US top twenty in early 1983. The ballad "Save a Prayer" also did well. "The band was a natural for music television," noted Rolling Stone. "They may be the first rock group to ride in on a video wave." The album ultimately peaked at number six in the US and remained on the charts there for 129 weeks. In 2003, Rio was listed at number 65 in the NME's list of the 100 Greatest Albums of All Time.

Duran Duran were among the earliest bands to work on their own remixes. Before the days of digital synthesizer and easy audio sampling, they created multi-layered arrangements of their singles, sometimes recording entirely different extended performances of the songs in the studio. These "night versions" were generally available only on vinyl as b-sides to 45 rpm singles or on 12-inch club singles until the release of the compilation Night Versions: The Essential Duran Duran in 1998.

=== 1983–1985: The "Fab Five", Side projects and Live Aid ===
The band began 1983 at the Palladium in New York playing the MTV New Year's Eve Rock n' Roll Ball with "Hungry Like the Wolf" still climbing the charts in the US, and the American reissue of the "Rio" single to follow in March. To satisfy America's appetite for their music, the band re-released their eponymous first album in the US in the middle of the year with the addition of the new single "Is There Something I Should Know?". Upon its release, this song entered the chart at number one in the UK (a rarity then and their first chart-topper in their home country) and reached number five on the American charts. During the promotion of this album, Rhodes and Le Bon were MTV guest VJs for a show, during which artist and admirer Andy Warhol dropped by to greet them. "Our first gigs in the United States were crazy and culty", Rhodes said later, "But when we came back after 'Hungry' was a hit, it was mayhem. It was Beatlemania. We were doing a signing of the 'Girls on Film' video at a store in Times Square. We couldn't get out of the store. The cops sealed off the streets." Also in 1983, Rhodes produced the UK number one and US number five hit "Too Shy" for English band Kajagoogoo and Andy Taylor became the first member of Duran Duran to get married.

The band spent the next year as tax exiles, writing songs at a château in France where The Tube with Jools Holland filmed a documentary with the band in May 1983 before they flew to Montserrat and then Sydney to record and mix their third album. During the summer, they returned to the UK to perform two concerts, the first on 20 July in front of the Prince and Princess of Wales at the Dominion Theatre, and the second, a charity concert at Aston Villa's home ground. The band were under pressure to follow up the success of Rio, and the recording process took over six months as different band members went through bouts of perfectionism and insecurity. A newly decadent lifestyle and substance abuse issues for some members added complications. In the documentary film Extraordinary World, filmed a decade later, Rhodes described the effect on their sound as "barely controlled hysteria, scratching beneath the surface".

The new album, Seven and the Ragged Tiger (1983), included the late 1983 hit "Union of the Snake" (with the soprano saxophone solo by Andy Hamilton). With "Hungry Like the Wolf", "Rio", "Save a Prayer" and "Is There Something I Should Know?", Duran Duran now had five US Top Twenty hits from three different albums in a single year. The band made music headlines by deciding to release the "Union of the Snake" video to MTV a full week before the single was released to radio. They followed up with "New Moon on Monday", which reached number nine in the UK. Their next single "The Reflex", taken from Seven and the Ragged Tiger and given a significant remix overhaul by Nile Rodgers of Chic fame, became their first number one hit in the United States. "The Reflex" was also their second and final UK number one and was successful in numerous other countries around the world.

The band embarked on a global tour that continued throughout the first four months of 1984 including their first major stadium dates in America. A film crew led by director Russell Mulcahy followed the band closely, leading to the documentary film Sing Blue Silver and the accompanying concert film Arena. The live album Arena was also recorded during the tour and was released with the new single "The Wild Boys", which went to number two on both sides of the Atlantic. In February 1984, the band appeared on the cover of Rolling Stone magazine and won two Grammy Awards in the brand-new Long Form and Short Form music video categories. Meanwhile, "Save a Prayer" gained momentum in North America, and a special US remix of the song became a single in January 1985. It peaked at number 16 on the Billboard Hot 100 in March. A live version of the song was used for the single's B-side, taken from the concert video footage for Arena / As the Lights Go Down.

During this period, all of the band members became heartthrobs for many of their young teenage fans. After the tour, Roger Taylor was married in Naples, Italy, and Rhodes wed in London, wearing a pink velvet tuxedo and top hat. At the end of 1984, the group featured on the Band Aid benefit single "Do They Know It's Christmas?" along with other popular British and Irish musical acts. Le Bon sang fourth on the song, after Paul Young, Boy George and George Michael sing their lines.

Even with Duran Duran on hold, band members were soon anxious to record new music, leading to a supposedly temporary split into two side projects. John Taylor and Andy Taylor wanted to break away from the Duran Duran sound and pursue hard rock material; they collaborated with lead vocalist Robert Palmer and Chic's drummer Tony Thompson to form the rock/funk supergroup the Power Station, releasing two top 10 singles. Le Bon and Rhodes wanted to further explore Duran Duran's atmospheric aspect and formed Arcadia, releasing one album (So Red the Rose) and an accompanying single ("Election Day"). Contributors to that album included guitarist Masami Tsuchiya, bassist Mark Egan, percussionist David Van Tieghem, drummer Steve Jordan, Sting, Herbie Hancock and David Gilmour of Pink Floyd. Roger Taylor was a drummer for Arcadia as well as contributing percussion to the Power Station album. According to Rhodes, the two side projects "were commercial suicide... But we've always been good at that." The band regrouped to contribute "A View to a Kill" to the 1985 James Bond film of the same name. This single was the first Bond theme to go to number one on the US charts, and was at the time the joint highest-placed Bond theme on the UK chart where it reached number two. It was the last single the band recorded as the original five-piece for close to twenty years.

As a follow-up to the Christmas 1984 Band Aid single, Duran Duran performed in front of 90,000 people (and an estimated 1.5 billion TV viewers) at the Live Aid charity concert at John F. Kennedy Stadium in Philadelphia, Pennsylvania, on 13 July 1985 while their Bond song held the top spot on the American charts. It was not intended to be a farewell performance—the band planned only to take a break after four years of non-stop touring and public appearances—but the original five did not play live together again until July 2003. During their Live Aid set, Le Bon inadvertently hit an off-key falsetto note in the chorus of "A View to a Kill", an error that was trumpeted by numerous media outlets as "The Bum Note Heard Round the World" (in contrast to Freddie Mercury's "Note Heard Round the World" at the Wembley Stadium Live Aid show). Le Bon later described the moment as the most embarrassing of his career.

=== 1986–1989: Le Bon, Rhodes and John Taylor trio ===
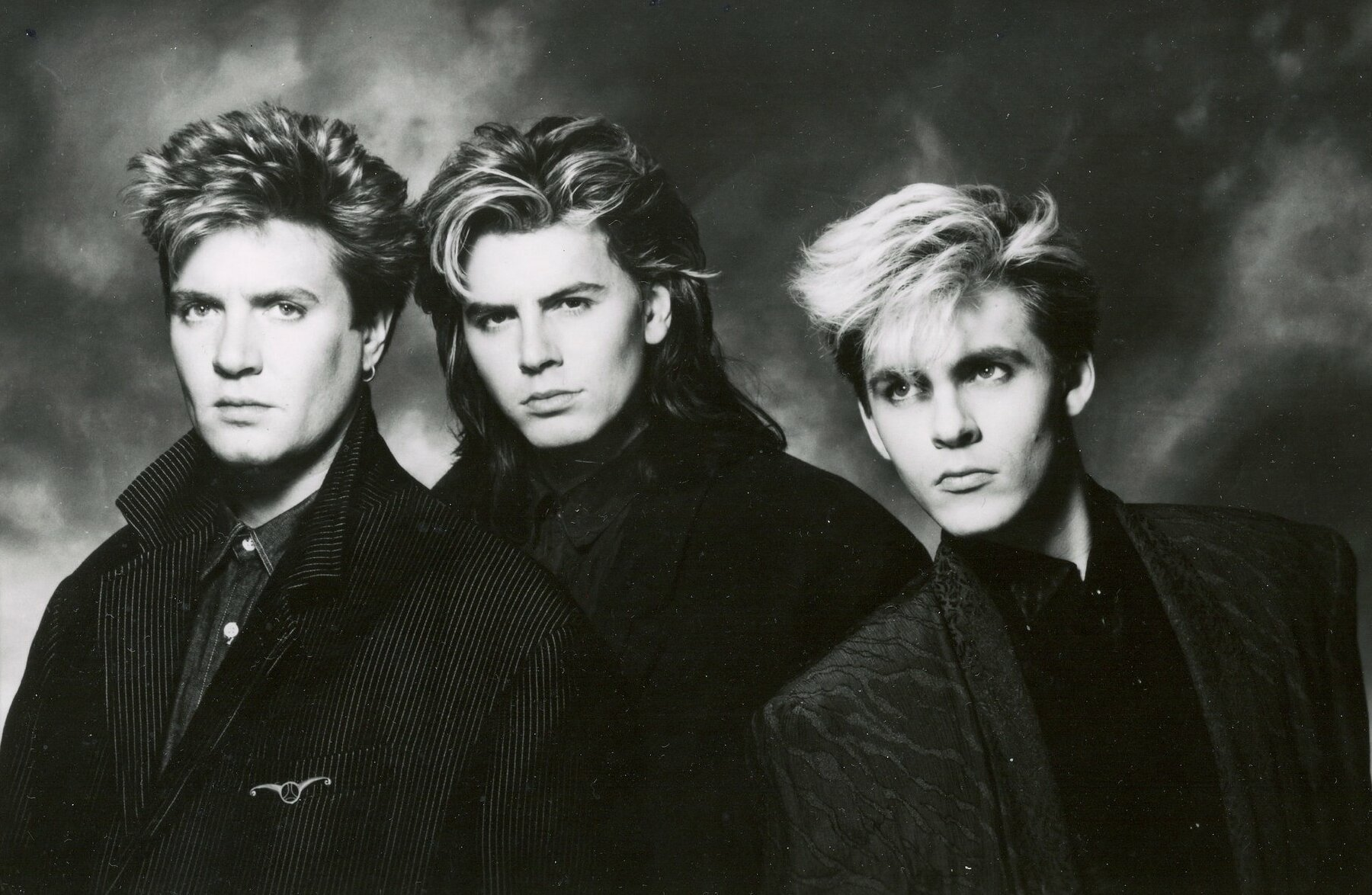
Duran Duran as a trio, in 1986

After releasing three studio albums and one live album in five years, each accompanied by heavy media promotion and lengthy concert tours, the band lost two of its core members to fatigue and tension in 1986. After Live Aid and Arcadia, Roger Taylor left the band and retired to the English countryside, suffering from exhaustion.

Andy Taylor led the remaining members to believe he would return to work on a new Duran Duran album, even as he was signing a solo recording contract in Los Angeles with MCA Records, eventually releasing a solo album in 1986 called Thunder. The band resorted to legal measures to get him into the studio but after numerous delays they let him go at last. He played on only a few songs on the next album, including "A Matter of Feeling", whilst the disagreements were being settled.

Without a guitarist or a drummer, Le Bon, Rhodes and John Taylor had producer (and former Chic guitarist) Nile Rodgers play a few tracks on guitar, and hired Steve Ferrone to play drums while they searched for replacements. In September 1986, Warren Cuccurullo (formerly of Missing Persons and Frank Zappa's band) was hired as a session guitarist. With Le Bon, Rhodes and John Taylor, he recorded the rest of the Notorious album, which was released in October 1986. The black-and-white documentary film Three to Get Ready chronicled the recording of the album, legal tensions, and preparations for the tour.

Although the song "Notorious" was a US and UK top ten hit, the album was a relative failure globally, reaching number 16 in the UK and spending one week in the top 50 album chart. The band found they had lost much of the momentum and hysteria they had left behind in 1985. In the three years between the release of Seven and the Ragged Tiger and Notorious, many of their teenage fans had grown up and the music was funkier, more mature, and less "pop", given the added experience of their work on Arcadia and Power Station and with other musicians. "Skin Trade" and "Meet El Presidente", the two subsequent singles, made the charts but fared poorly compared to the band's earlier successes. Finally in late 1987, Sterling Campbell was hired as a session drummer.

Subsequently, Duran Duran struggled to escape the teen idol image and gain respect among critics with more complex music. The new serious image was not accepted at first and their popularity began to wane. Rolling Stone said, "In their search for musical maturity, the surviving Durans have lost a good deal of their identity." In contrast the New York Times said, "Duran Duran's newfound disillusionment may mark a step toward maturity...they managed to catch a trend on the upswing, perhaps "Notorious" suggests that for late 1980s grit and pessimism is coming into style." Another factor was the band's dismissal of early managers, the Berrow brothers. There was no announcement of the reasons for the decision, but disagreements over money, and the brothers' involvement in Le Bon's yachting adventures (they were co-owners of Drum) were thought to have played a part. Whatever the reason, Duran Duran switched managers frequently and undertook periods of self-management in the later stages of their career. In addition, EMI fired its president and went through a major corporate restructuring that summer and seemed to have lost interest in promoting the band. According to Rhodes the band needed to break up in order to come back together stronger.

The next album Big Thing (1988) yielded the singles "I Don't Want Your Love" (number four in the US), and "All She Wants Is" (the last top ten hit in the UK until 1993). The record was experimental, mixing influences from house music and raves with Duran's atmospheric synth-pop and the creative guitar work of Cuccurullo (now a full band member), as well as more mature lyrics.

=== 1989–1991: Five again, Decade and Liberty ===
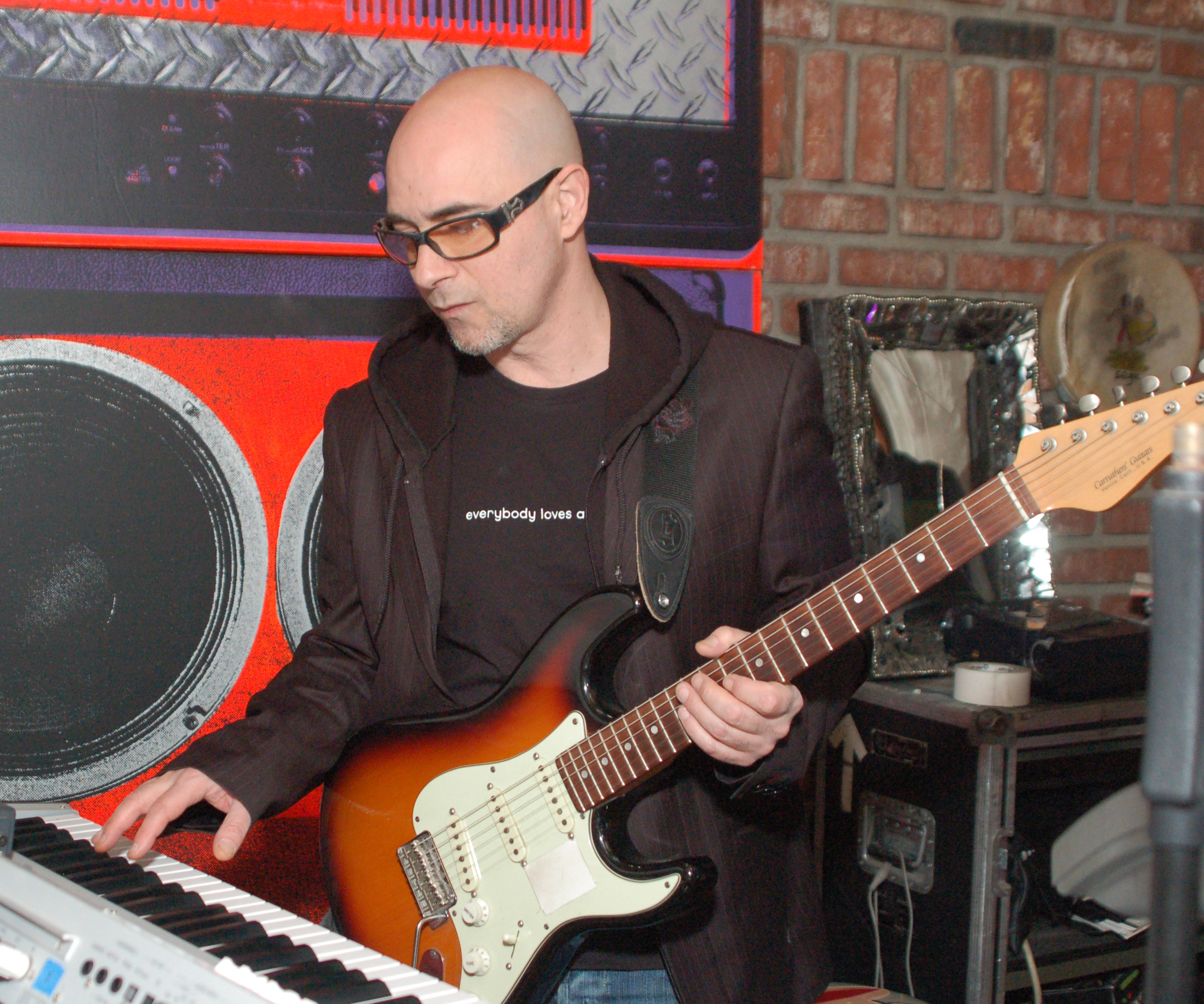
After contributing to the band for three years, Warren Cuccurullo (pictured in 2009) was made a full-time member of Duran Duran in 1989.

By the end of 1989 and at the start of the 1990s, the popularity of synth-pop was fading and losing fans to other momentum-gaining music genres at the time, such as hip-hop, techno and alternative rock. After touring for the album finished, the band regained a five-man membership as Cuccurullo and Campbell were made full members of Duran Duran.

The compilation album Decade was released late in 1989, along with the megamix single "Burning the Ground", which consisted of woven snippets of the band's hits from the previous ten years, created and produced with John Jones, who began working with the band after the release of Big Thing. The single came and went with little fanfare, but the album became another major seller for the band. The 1990 release Liberty (a retreat from the experimentation of Big Thing) failed to capitalise on any regained momentum. The album entered the UK album chart in the top ten, but faded away quickly. The singles "Violence of Summer (Love's Taking Over)" and "Serious" were only mildly successful. For the first time, Duran Duran did not tour in support of an album, performing on only a handful of club dates and TV shows. Campbell left the band early in 1991, going on to work with Soul Asylum and David Bowie. The quartet of Le Bon, Rhodes, John Taylor and Cuccurullo would remain intact for six more years.

=== 1992–1996: Quartet line-up and a brief comeback ===
In 1993, the band released a second self-titled album: this Duran Duran album is known as The Wedding Album (for Nick Egan's cover art featuring the wedding photos of the band members' parents) to distinguish it from the 1981 release, and was produced and recorded with John Jones. The release of this first "comeback" album was delayed, with then manager at Left Bank, Tommy Manzi, later telling HitQuarters that this was due to industry resistance to the revival of the band, who he said would rather focus on "the next hip band". Listener demand for leaked single "Ordinary World" forced it onto radio playlists months earlier than planned; it reached number three on the US chart and number six in the UK and won a prestigious Ivor Novello Award for song writing.

"Come Undone", primarily written by Cuccurullo, with lyrics by Le Bon, made number seven in the US and number 13 in the UK. Both the band and the record label seemed to be caught by surprise by the album's critical and commercial success (number four in the UK, number seven in the US). John Taylor had been considering leaving the band but changed his mind. The band's largest tour ever, which included stops in the Middle East, the then recently de-embargoed South Africa, and South America, was halted after seven months when Le Bon suffered from strained vocal cords. After six weeks' recuperation, the band performed intermittently for another five months, including appearances in Israel, Thailand, and Indonesia.

In 1995, the band released the cover album Thank You. Songs from Thank You included covers of Lou Reed's "Perfect Day" and Melle Mel's "White Lines (Don't Don't Do It)" (with backing vocals from the original artists). The album also marked the temporary return of former drummer Roger Taylor, who joined the band in studio to play drums on "Watching the Detectives" and "Perfect Day" (as well as a cover of "Jeepster" by T. Rex that did not appear on the album). In a video interview provided with the album's electronic press kit, Reed said he considered Duran Duran's version the best cover ever done of one of his songs, and they received praise from Robert Plant and Jimmy Page for their cover of Led Zeppelin's "Thank You".

=== 1997–2000: John Taylor's departure and second trio ===
After the promo tour for Thank You was completed, John Taylor co-founded the B5 Records label, recorded a solo album, founded and toured with the supergroup Neurotic Outsiders, and reunited the Power Station, though the project proceeded without him when he had to withdraw to deal with his divorce. Finally, after struggling for months to record the next album, Medazzaland, in January 1997, John Taylor announced at the DuranCon fan convention that he was leaving the band "for good". His departure reduced the band to two long time members (Le Bon and Rhodes) and Cuccurullo, who decided to continue recording under the name Duran Duran.

Freed from some internal writing conflicts, the band returned to the studio to rewrite and re-record many of the songs on Medazzaland (John Taylor's work remains on only four tracks). The album marked a return to the layered experimentation of Big Thing, with intricate guitar textures and processed vocals. The track "Out of My Mind" was used as the theme song for the film The Saint (1997), but the only true single to be released in the United States was the quirky "Electric Barbarella", which is one of the first singles ever to be sold online. The music video for this single, featuring a sexy robot purchased and played with by band members, had to be censored before airing on MTV, but there was little of the controversy that had surrounded "Girls on Film". "Electric Barbarella" peaked at number 52 in the US in October 1997. Although Medazzaland was released in the US in October 1997, the album was never released in the UK. "Electric Barbarella" was later released in the UK as a single from the 1998 Greatest compilation album and peaked at number 23 on the UK chart in January 1999. The group played a set at the Princess Diana Tribute Concert on 27 June 1998 by special request of her family.

Duran Duran parted ways with Capitol/EMI in 1999, although the label has since used Duran Duran's back catalogue to release several compilations of remixes and rare vinyl-only B-sides. The band then signed what was intended to be a three-album contract with Disney Music Group's Hollywood Records, but it lasted only through the poorly received 2000 album Pop Trash. This slow-paced and heavy album seemed out-of-keeping with earlier band material. Rhodes' intricate production and Cuccurullo's songwriting and experimentation with guitar sounds and time signatures were not enough to hook the public, and the album did not perform well. The dreamy single "Someone Else Not Me" lasted barely two weeks on the radio, although its video was noted as the first to be produced entirely with Flash animation. While supporting Medazzaland and Pop Trash, Duran Duran toured with bassist Wes Wehmiller and drummer Joe Travers.

=== 2001–2005: Reunion ===
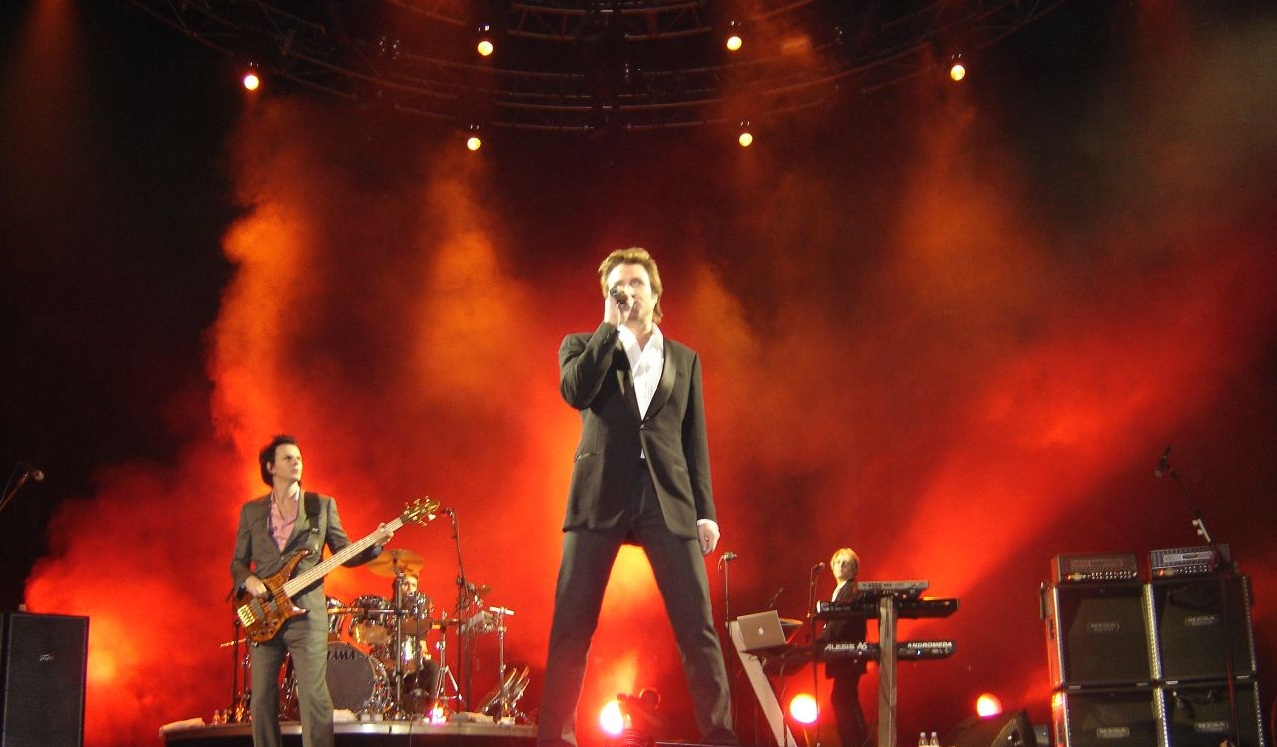
Duran Duran performing live at Scotiabank Arena in Toronto, Canada, 2005

In 2000, Le Bon approached John Taylor with a proposal to reform Duran Duran's classic line-up. They agreed to part company with Cuccurullo after completing the Pop Trash tour. Cuccurullo then announced on his website that he was leaving Duran Duran to resume work with his 1980s band Missing Persons. This announcement was confirmed the next day by Duran Duran's website, followed a day later by the news that John, Roger and Andy had rejoined. To fulfill contractual obligations, Cuccurullo played three Duran Duran concerts in Japan in June 2001, ending his tenure in the band.

Throughout 2001, 2002 and 2003, the band worked on writing new material, initially renting a house in Saint-Tropez where audio engineer Mark Tinley built a recording studio for their first serious writing session. They then returned to London to do some self-financed work with various producers (including old friend Nile Rodgers) and search for a new record deal. It proved difficult to find a record label willing to gamble on the band's comeback, so Duran Duran went on tour to prove the drawing power of the reunited band. The response of the fans and the media exceeded expectations. The band played a handful of 25th-anniversary dates across 2003, starting with two arena dates in Tokyo filled to capacity. Tickets sold out for each show within minutes, and celebrities turned out en masse for reunion dates. Amongst these were a number of shows at smaller venues that the band had played on both sides of the pond when they first got together in the early 1980s. In August, the band were booked as presenters at the 2003 MTV Video Music Awards, only to be surprised with a Lifetime Achievement Award. They also received a Lifetime Achievement award from Q magazine in October, and the equivalent Outstanding Contribution award at the BRIT Awards in February 2004.

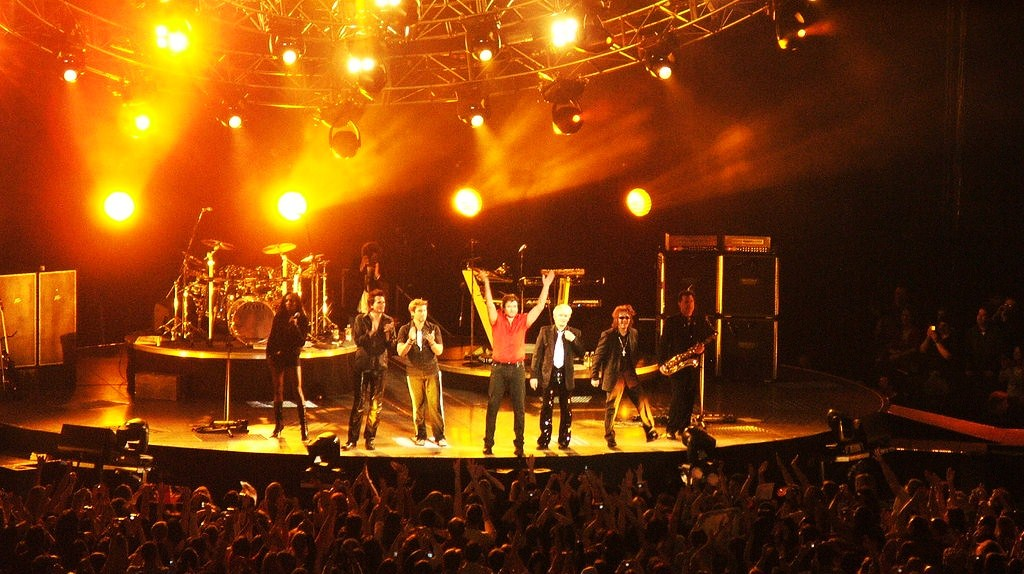
Duran Duran in New York City, 2005

The pace picked up with a sold-out tour of America, Australia and New Zealand. The band played a full concert at a private tailgate party at Super Bowl XXXVIII, their performance of "The Wild Boys" broadcast to millions during the pre-game show. A remix of the new track "(Reach Up for The) Sunrise" was released on many TV shows in February while magazines hailed (the modern "Fab Five") Duran Duran as one of the greatest bands of all time. Duran Duran then celebrated their homecoming to the UK with fourteen stadium dates in April 2004, including five sold-out nights at Wembley Arena. The British press, traditionally hostile to the band, accorded the shows some very warm reviews. Duran Duran brought along band Goldfrapp and the Scissor Sisters as alternating opening acts for this tour. The last two shows were filmed, resulting in the concert DVD Duran Duran: Live from London which was released in November.

Finally, with more than thirty-five songs completed, the band signed a two-album contract with Epic Records in June, and completed the new album, now titled Astronaut. The album was released in October 2004 and entered the UK charts at number three and the US charts at number 17. The first single was "(Reach Up for The) Sunrise", which reached number one on the Billboard US Dance chart in November and peaked at number five on the UK Singles Chart, Duran Duran's highest chart position since "A View to a Kill" in 1985. A second single, "What Happens Tomorrow", debuted at No. 11 on the UK chart in February. A 5.1 mix of Astronaut was created by Jeremy Wheatley for the dual-disc release of Astronaut. The CD side contains the album as-is and the DVD side contains the 5.1 mix of the album in DVD Audio format along with some DVD footage and videos.

After a world tour in early 2005, Duran Duran were presented with the PRS Outstanding Contribution to British Music at the 2005 Ivor Novello Awards. Later that summer, the band headlined the massive Live 8 concert, Rome on 2 July 2005 in the Circus Maximus.

=== 2006–2008: Red Carpet Massacre and Andy Taylor's second departure ===
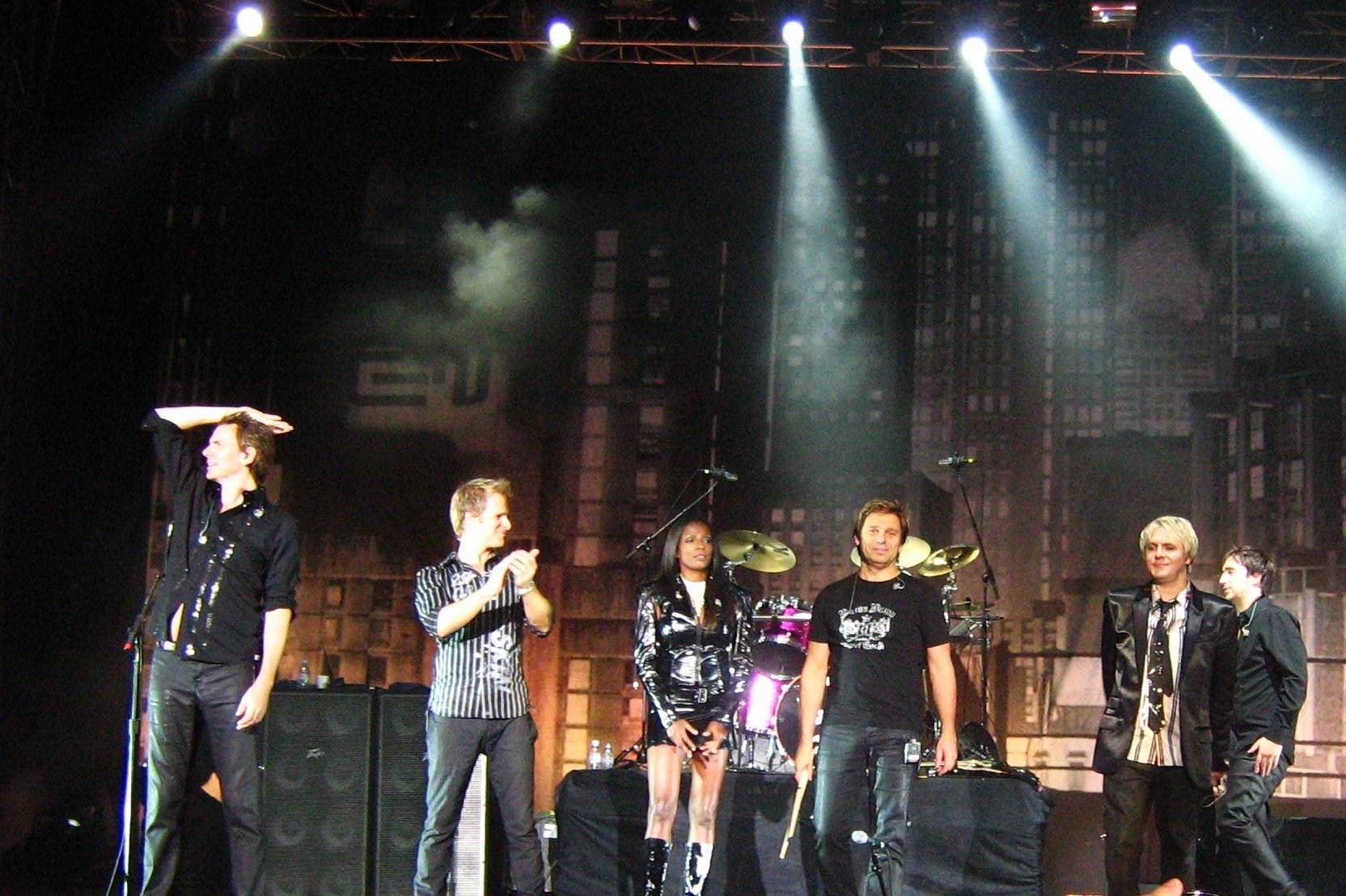
Duran Duran in Bogotá, Colombia, 2008

In early 2006, Duran Duran covered John Lennon's song "Instant Karma!" for the Make Some Noise campaign sponsored by Amnesty International. Their version later appeared on Instant Karma: The Amnesty International Campaign to Save Darfur as an iTunes exclusive bonus track. They also performed at two high-profile events – the Nobel Prize Awards and the 2006 Winter Olympics. After a couple of weeks of songwriting in Northern California, the band began working with producer Michael Patterson in London, and continued intermittently for the next several months. At one point, they reported having had fifteen tracks nearly complete for an album tentatively titled Reportage, but no further news emerged from the band for months afterward. In September, the band held meetings in New York City with Justin Timberlake and producer Timbaland with an eye to a potential collaboration and were soon reported to have completed three songs with the producer, including a song with Justin Timberlake.

On 25 October 2006, Duran Duran parted company with Andy Taylor once again. In an official announcement on their website, the band stated that an "unworkable gulf" had developed between them and Taylor and that "we can no longer effectively function together". It was noted by Andy Taylor in his book Wild Boy that tensions had arisen between the group's management and himself, and he was also diagnosed with clinical depression connected with the death of his father. Dom Brown, who had previously toured with the band, again took over guitar duties and has been performing with them since. After Taylor's departure, the band scrapped the Reportage album. They wrote and recorded a new album titled Red Carpet Massacre (2007), which included the Timbaland tracks. Dom Brown is the featured guitarist on the album.

In July 2007, the band performed twice at Wembley Stadium. Their first appearance at the stadium was the Concert for Diana which celebrated the life of Princess Diana almost 10 years after her death. The band performed "(Reach Up for The) Sunrise", "The Wild Boys" and "Rio". Their second appearance was at Live Earth concert, London. On 25 September, the Timberlake collaboration "Falling Down" was released as a download single on iTunes, and the band announced that they would play nine shows at the Ethel Barrymore Theatre on Broadway to launch the Red Carpet Massacre album. The album launch was later extended to incorporate a show in London on 3 December 2007 and one in Dublin on 5 December 2007.

In May 2008, they toured the US leg of their 2008 world tour and were supported by the British band Your Vegas. In June 2008, they played the Louvre in Paris in a fundraising effort that contributed to the restoration of a Louis XV drawing room. Guests dined, privately viewed some of the museum's artworks, then attended a performance by the band in the I.M. Pei-designed Pyramid du Louvre. The group's performance marked a first for the 18th-century museum which had never before allowed a rock concert to occur anywhere within the grounds or buildings and another groundbreaker for Duran Duran.

On 2 July 2008, in Paris, Mark Ronson performed a unique live set with Duran Duran for an exclusive, invitation-only performance. Together, they showcased specially re-worked versions of some of Duran Duran's classic hits re-created by Ronson, along with tracks from Red Carpet Massacre. Le Bon also performed songs from Ronson's latest album, Version (2007), as one of Ronson's featured guest vocalists. Unlike the band's previous album Astronaut (2004), Red Carpet Massacre sold poorly and received mixed responses from the music press. In 2008, Rio was included in the Classic Albums series.

=== 2009–2012: All You Need Is Now ===
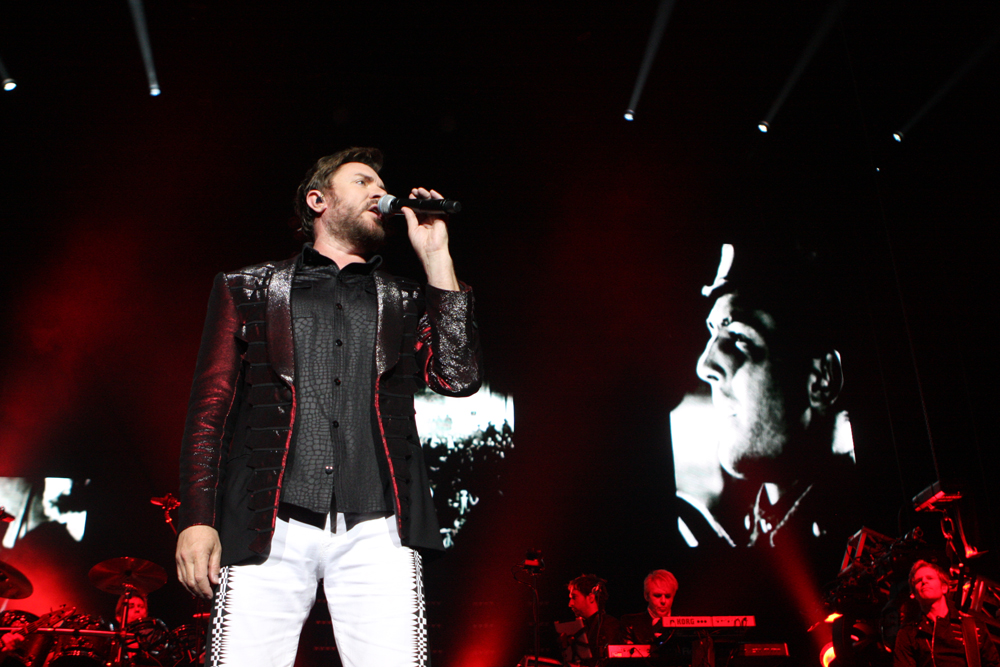
Duran Duran performing live at the Sydney Entertainment Centre, Australia, 2012

The band departed from Epic Records in 2009, after releasing just two albums. In early 2010, it was revealed that the band would be contributing a cover of "Boys Keep Swinging" to a tribute/charity record for David Bowie called We Were So Turned On from which all profits go to War Child. Other contributing artists included Carla Bruni, Devendra Banhart, Edward Sharpe & the Magnetic Zeros, and Warpaint. The album was released on 14 September 2010 on Manimal Vinyl Records. A limited edition split 7-inch single with Duran Duran and Carla Bruni was also released on Manimal Vinyl in December 2010.

On 21 December 2010, Duran Duran's thirteenth album, titled All You Need Is Now, produced by the Grammy Award-winning Mark Ronson and mixed by Spike Stent, was released exclusively on iTunes and hit the number one spot on download charts in 15 countries (including the UK). The first single from the record, title track "All You Need Is Now", was free to download worldwide on 8 December 2010 exclusively in iTunes. Guitarist and songwriter Dom Brown co-wrote all but two songs on the album.

On 25 February 2011, while in Milan, Duran Duran received a Style Icons of the 20th Century Award and a key to the city, presented by the city's mayor Letizia Moratti.

In March 2011 the band embarked on a world tour in support of the album. After a warm-up show in London, the tour officially began 16 March 2011 in Austin, Texas. On 23 March, the band performed live at the Mayan Theater in Los Angeles as the start of the second season of Unstaged: An Original Series from American Express. The concert was directed by David Lynch and live-streamed on YouTube. The band was joined onstage by Gerard Way of My Chemical Romance, Beth Ditto of Gossip, and Kelis. On 17 April 2011, Duran Duran performed at the Coachella Music Festival located at Empire Polo Grounds, in Indio, California. In May 2011, Le Bon contracted laryngitis leading to either cancellation or rescheduling of most of the European dates for the All You Need Is Now World Tour.

On 27 July 2012, Duran Duran headlined the London Summer Olympics 2012 Opening Ceremony celebration in Hyde Park. They represented England, along with Snow Patrol for Northern Ireland, Stereophonics for Wales, and Paolo Nutini for Scotland. At the end of August 2012, with one week left of their 18-month world tour, the band were forced to cancel the rest of the North American leg of the tour as Nick Rhodes had become ill with a viral infection.

=== 2013–2018: Paper Gods ===
On 4 March 2013, the band returned to the studio to work on their fourteenth album, and continued during the week beginning 23 September. They reconvened 13 to 18 December. On 31 December 2013, the band posted a mixtape curated by John Taylor as a New Year's "thank you" to their fans. On 10 February 2014, John Taylor and Roger Taylor worked with the Voce Chamber Choir and London Youth Chamber Choir on vocals for use on some Duran Duran tracks. Then former Red Hot Chili Peppers guitarist John Frusciante worked with the band on the new album.

On 11 September 2015, the album Paper Gods was released. The single "Pressure Off" was also released the same week, first via Microsoft's Xbox Music. The song subsequently appeared on Google Play Music. The album debuted at number 10 on the Billboard 200, the band's highest debut in 22 years. The album also reached number two in Italy, number four in the Netherlands, and number five in the UK. In 2016, the artist MNDR stood in for Rhodes during part of the third leg of the Paper Gods tour in the United States, while he returned to the UK in order to attend to an urgent family matter. Rhodes was quoted as saying, "I will be back as soon as I can but know, in the meantime, that I am leaving both the band and fans in great hands, with the fabulous MNDR." Also, several remixes of their song "Last Night in the City" were released in digital form in that year.

In December 2016, the original five-piece lineup lost a case in the British High Court after they attempted to reclaim the U.S. copyright on their first three albums from Gloucester Place Music, part of EMI Music Publishing. Rhodes commented, "We signed a publishing agreement as unsuspecting teenagers, over three decades ago, when just starting out and when we knew no better... if left untested, this judgment sets a very bad precedent for all songwriters of our era." In March 2020, Duran Duran signed with the Warner/Chappell Music publisher, covering their post-1986 catalogue. The band spent 2017 touring the American continent and playing a handful of festival dates in Europe and Asia.

=== 2019–2022: Future Past and Rock and Roll Hall of Fame Induction ===
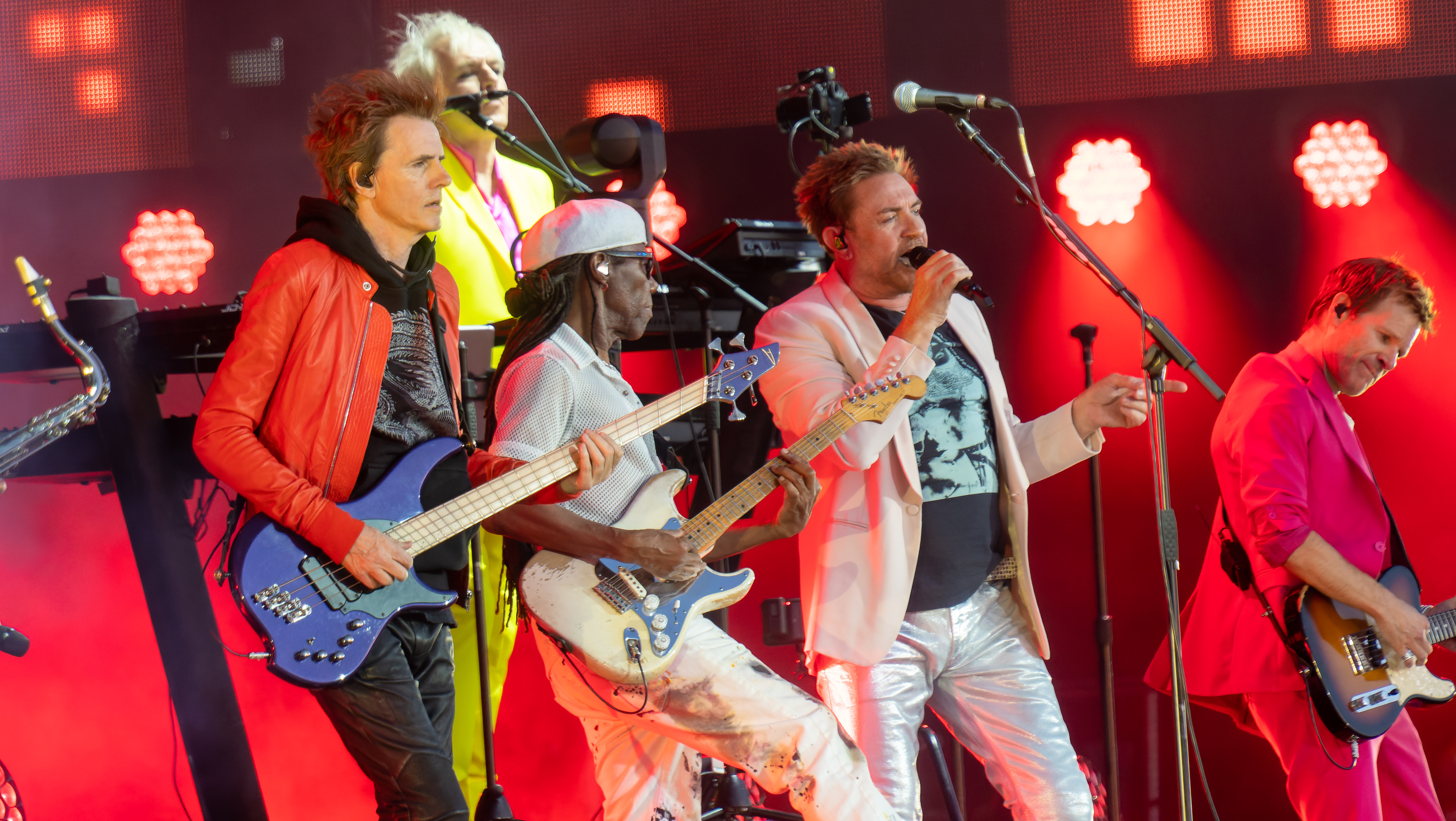
Duran Duran performing at BST Hyde Park 2022, with Nile Rodgers

In 2019, Duran Duran were working on a new album with Ronson, Erol Alkan and Giorgio Moroder handling production duties, and Graham Coxon and Lykke Li being confirmed as collaborators. Rhodes described the content and sound of a possible first single to be "very different for us." Initially planned for release in 2020, the recording of the album was put on hold in March 2020 due to the COVID-19 pandemic. On 8 January 2021, a cover of "Five Years" by David Bowie was released for the fifth anniversary of his death. On 13 January 2021, Rolling Stone included the album at number 50 on their "54 Most Anticipated Albums of 2021" list. Le Bon said that the album is "quite naked, raw. The grass is slightly sharp and twinkly rather than smooth," and is "groovy (and) modern and very honest. The lyrics are quite something." On 18 May, the album title was announced as Future Past.

On 19 May, the first single from the album "Invisible" was released along with a music video, and features Coxon as a guitarist and co-writer. On 9 July, the band premiered a second song from the album titled "Give It All Up" on NBC's Today show. On 5 August, Duran Duran released the album's second single "More Joy!", featuring further collaboration with Coxon, Erol Alkan and also Japanese rock band Chai. On 12 August, the band appeared on The Tonight Show with Jimmy Fallon performing "Invisible". On 31 August, Duran Duran released the album's third single "Anniversary", followed by the fourth single, "Tonight United", on 24 September. On 14 and 15 September, the band played two sold-out gigs at Birmingham's O_{2} Institute. That was the first time they played live since their last live gig in 2019. Along with their hit songs, they performed three tracks from Future Past—"Invisible", "Anniversary" and "Tonight United". The band headlined the Isle of Wight festival on 19 September.

On 22 October 2021, Future Past was released. The album entered the UK Album Chart at number three, the band's highest peak since 2004's Astronaut. This also earned the band the distinction of having UK Top 5 albums in each of the five decades they had been releasing music (1980s–2020s). On 22 January 2022, Duran Duran played on Austin City Limits. In June 2022, Duran Duran performed at the Platinum Party at the Palace. In July 2022, the band returned to the city of their origin, Birmingham to headline the opening ceremony of Birmingham 2022 Commonwealth Games playing to a capacity Alexander Stadium.

In 2022, the band topped the fan vote (over 1 million preferences) for induction into the Rock and Roll Hall of Fame for the class of 2022, and in May of that year were announced as one of the seven inductees in the "Performer" category. On 11 July 2022, Duran Duran headlined a concert in Hyde Park, London, to more than 80,000 adoring fans, as part of the 2022 BST concert series. The ceremony at the Rock & Roll Hall of Fame was held on 5 November 2022, where Robert Downey Jr. inducted the band. John Taylor, Roger Taylor, Rhodes and Le Bon each attended the induction ceremony and performed "Girls on Film", "Hungry Like the Wolf" and "Ordinary World" along with longtime touring guitarist Dom Brown. During the acceptance speech, Simon Le Bon read from a letter written by Andy Taylor, who was absent from the ceremony, that revealed he has been privately fighting stage IV metastatic prostate cancer for the past four years and was "massively disappointed" he couldn't attend.

=== 2023–present: Danse Macabre ===
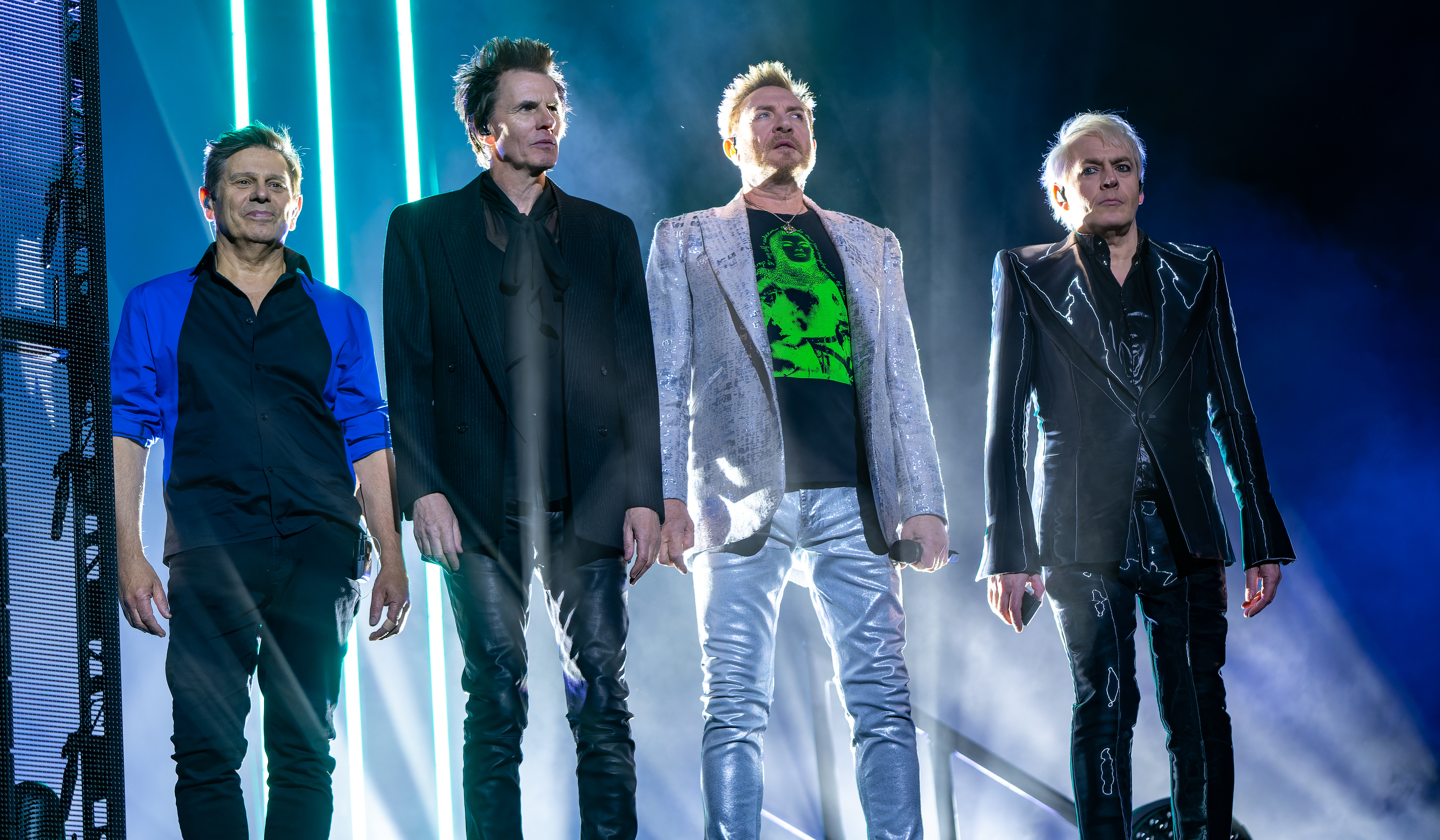
Duran Duran at The O2 Arena in London, 2023

On 20 March 2023, Duran Duran took to their Instagram to announce they are working on a new musical project, set for release in late 2023. The work will feature a collaboration with former band members Andy Taylor and Warren Cuccurullo. The project, Danse Macabre, was released on 27 October. A Halloween-themed album, it features new songs, reworkings of older material and several covers.

The first single—the title track "Danse Macabre"—was released on 30 August 2023. The second single, "Black Moonlight", followed on 21 September.

On 13 September 2024, the band released a new reworking of their 1983 single "New Moon on Monday" titled "New Moon (Dark Phase)", ahead of a planned deluxe reissue of Danse Macabre. The single features contributions from Andy Taylor.

In 2025, Carlo Conti announced that Duran Duran would be special guests of Sanremo Music Festival on the third night. They performed with Victoria De Angelis. In March 2025, the band teamed up with fragrance house Xerjoff to release two unisex fragrances: NeoRio and Black Moonlight. On 23 October 2025, they released a re-recording of their Seven and the Ragged Tiger song "Shadows on Your Side", featuring new guitar parts by Andy Taylor. According to Rhodes, the remake was inspired by "the madness and joy of Halloween". A new single, "Free to Love", featuring Nile Rodgers, was released on 23 April 2026.

On 12 November 2026, Duran Duran announced Roger Taylor's retirement from the band and music, citing a worsening case of tinnitus. Taylor said: "This is one of the hardest decisions I've ever had to make. Playing drums in this band has been the joy of my life, and I'll never be able to properly thank the fans for the love they've shown us over the years. But the truth is that my tinnitus has been getting steadily worse, and I've reached the point where I must now listen to my body and my doctors." Le Bon, John Taylor and Rhodes respected his decision.

== Musical style and influences ==
Duran Duran have been described as synth pop and new wave, pop rock, dance-rock, and post-disco, as well as part of the new pop movement. Le Bon described the group as "the band to dance to when the bomb drops". Influences on Duran Duran included David Bowie, Roxy Music, the Beatles and the Doors; the electronic music of John Foxx's Ultravox, Kraftwerk, the Yellow Magic Orchestra and Giorgio Moroder; glam rock and American rock such as T. Rex, Iggy Pop, Lou Reed and Sparks; British punk and post-punk bands including the Clash, Sex Pistols and Siouxsie and the Banshees; the disco/funk band Chic; and the contemporary synth-pop groups Japan, the Human League and Orchestral Manoeuvres in the Dark. Roger Taylor said in a 2012 interview: "All these different influences were coming into the studio. Somehow, it had its own life. It became very unique in itself. It was influenced by a lot of different people."

== Videos ==
The MTV cable channel and the band were launched around the same time, and each had a hand in propelling the other to greater heights. MTV needed showcase videos with charismatic performers. Les Garland, senior executive vice-president at MTV, said "I remember our director of talent and artist relations came running in and said, "You have got to see this video that's come in". Duran Duran were getting zero radio airplay at the time, and MTV wanted to try to break new music. "Hungry Like the Wolf" was the greatest video I'd ever seen". The band's video work was influential in several ways. First, Duran Duran filmed in exotic locales like Sri Lanka and Antigua, creating memorable images that were radically different from the then-common low budget "band-playing-on-a-stage" videos. Second, rather than simply playing their instruments, the band participated in mini-storylines (often taking inspiration from contemporary movies: "Hungry Like the Wolf" riffs on 1981's Raiders of the Lost Ark, "The Wild Boys" on 1981's Mad Max 2), etc. While videos were already headed in this direction, Duran Duran led the trend with a style, featuring quick editing, arresting graphic design, and surreal-to-nonsensical image inserts, that drew attention from commentators and spawned a wealth of imitators.

Duran Duran were among the first bands to have their videos shot with a professional movie camera on 35mm film, rather than on videotape, making them look superior to many of the quickly shot videos which had been MTV staples until then. MTV provided Duran Duran with access to American radio markets that were unfriendly to British music, new wave music, or "anything with synthesisers". Because MTV was not available everywhere in the United States at first, it was easy to see a pattern: where MTV went, listener demand for Duran Duran, Tears for Fears, Def Leppard and other European bands with interesting videos went through the roof. The band's sun-drenched videos for "Rio", "Hungry Like the Wolf" and "Save a Prayer", and the surreal "Is There Something I Should Know?" were filmed by future movie director Russell Mulcahy, who made eleven videos for the band. Duran Duran have always sought out innovative directors and techniques, even in their later years when MTV gave them little airplay. In addition to Mulcahy, they have had videos filmed by influential photographers Dean Chamberlain and Ellen von Unwerth, Chinese director Chen Kaige, documentary filmmaker Julien Temple, and the Polish Brothers, among others. According to Rhodes, "Video is to us like stereo was to Pink Floyd."

"The British won out here, hands down. Next to the prosaic, foursquare appearance of the American bands, such acts as Duran Duran seemed like caviar. MTV opened up a whole new world that could not be fully apprehended over the radio. The visual angle played to the arty conceits of Britain's young style barons, suggesting something more exotic than the viewer was likely to find in the old hometown. The big Duran Duran hits, "Girls on Film" and "Hungry Like the Wolf", were MTV favorites three months before radio began to pick up on them. And via MTV, Duran Duran and their like have engendered an outpouring of good old-fashioned hysteria among teenage girls."

— "Anglomania: The Second British Invasion", by Parke Puterbaugh for Rolling Stone, November 1983.

In 1984, Duran Duran introduced video technology into their live stadium shows by being among the first acts to provide video screens above the stage. They have recorded concerts using IMAX and 360-degree panoramic "immersive video" cameras, with 10.2 channel audio. In 2000, they experimented with augmented reality technology, which allowed three-dimensional computer-generated images to appear on stage with the band. They appeared on several century-end video countdowns: The MTV "100 Greatest Videos Ever Made" featured "Hungry Like the Wolf" at No. 11 and "Girls on Film" at No. 68, and the "VH1: 100 Greatest Videos" listed "Hungry" at No. 31 and "Rio" at No. 60. MTV named "Hungry" the 15th of their most played videos of all time.

The band has released several video compilations, starting with the self-titled "video album" Duran Duran (1983), for which they won a Grammy Award, up to the 2004 two-disc DVD release Greatest, which included alternative versions of several popular videos as Easter eggs. In addition to Greatest, the documentary Sing Blue Silver, and the concert film Arena (both from 1984) were released on DVD in 2004. Live from London, a concert video from one of their sold-out 2004 reunion shows at Wembley Arena, was released in the fall of 2005.

Other video collections, concert films, and documentaries remain available only on videotape, and Duran Duran have not yet released a collection which includes all their videos. The band has said that a huge amount of unreleased concert and documentary footage has been filmed over the years, which they hope can be edited and released in some form in the near future. The video for "Falling Down" was released in October 2007. The Nick Egan-directed video for the lead single and title track from All You Need Is Now was premiered via Yahoo Music on 20 December 2010. The second video from All You Need Is Now, "Girl Panic", was released on 8 November 2011. It features some of the world's most famous supermodels, such as Yasmin Le Bon, Cindy Crawford, Naomi Campbell, Eva Herzigová and Helena Christensen, playing the band. The video was directed by Jonas Akerlund, and during the filming, an editorial was made for Harper's Bazaar magazine.

== Visual style ==
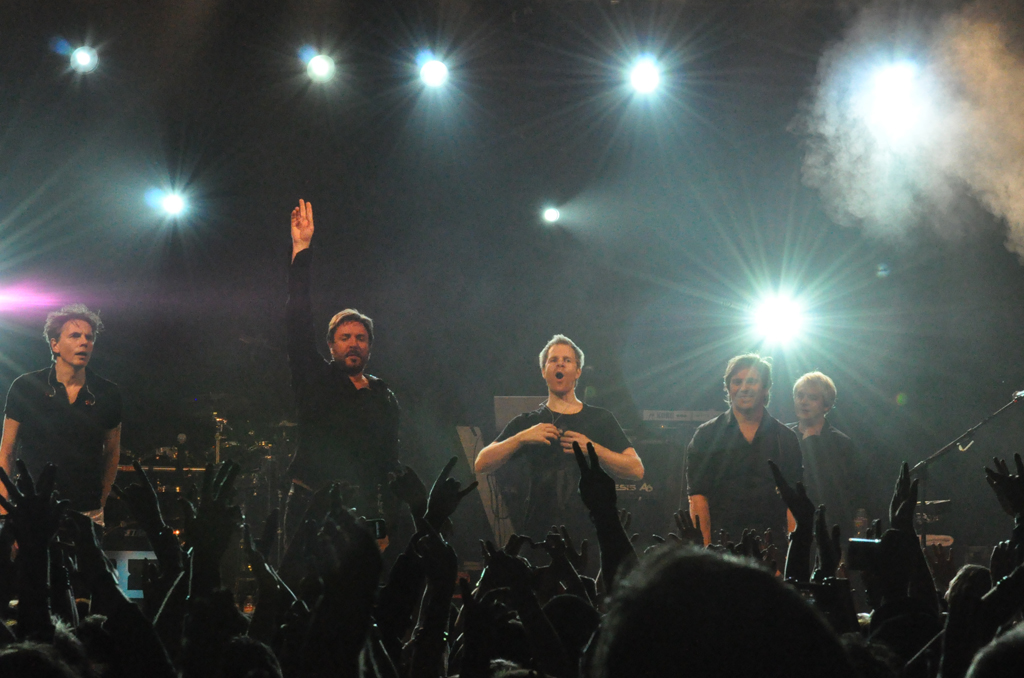
Duran Duran at SXSW in Austin, Texas, 2011

From the beginning of their career, all the members had a keen sense of visual style. They worked with stylist Perry Haines and fashion designers such as Kahn & Bell and Antony Price to build a sharp and elegant image, soon outgrowing the ruffles and sashes of the pirate-flavoured early New Romantic look that had been popularised by Adam Ant during 1980–81. They have continued to present fashion as part of their package throughout their career. In the 1990s they worked with Vivienne Westwood and in the 2000s with Giorgio Armani. The band retained creative control of their visual presentation having worked closely with graphic designer Malcolm Garrett and many others over the years to create album covers, tour programs and other materials.

Teen and music magazines in the UK latched onto their good looks quickly, and the USA soon followed. It was a rare month in the early 1980s when there was not at least one picture of the band members in teen magazines such as Smash Hits or Tiger Beat. John Taylor once remarked that the band was "like a box of Quality Street [chocolates]; everyone is someone's favourite" Duran Duran later came to regret this early pin-up exposure, but at the time it helped attract national attention. In an interview with Rock Fever Superstars magazine in early 1988, John Taylor stated:

We used to be a very chi-chi name to drop in '79, but then the Fab Five hype started and something went wrong. Something went really wrong. That wasn't what I wanted. [...] Not that I didn't like being screamed at. At one point I really did".

== Legacy ==
Although they began their career as "a group of art school, experimental, post punk rockers," the band's quick rise to stardom, polished good looks and embrace of the teen press almost guaranteed disfavour from music critics. During the 1980s, Duran Duran were considered the quintessential manufactured, throw-away pop group. According to the Sunday Herald, "To describe them, as some have, as the first boy band, misrepresents their appeal. Their weapons were never just their looks, but self-penned songs." Moby said of the band in his blog in 2003: "... they were cursed by what we can call the 'Bee Gees' curse, which is: 'write amazing songs, sell tons of records, and consequently incur the wrath or disinterest of the rock obsessed critical establishment.'"

Several of the band's contemporaries including the Bangles, Elton John, Kylie Minogue, Paul Young, and even the Monkees have named themselves fans of the band's music. Successors like Barenaked Ladies, Beck, Jonathan Davis of Korn, Gwen Stefani and Pink have all cited Duran Duran as a key band in their formative years. Justin Timberlake is a fan of the band and presented them with the Outstanding Contribution award at the 2004 Brit Awards. The most recent crop of performers to name Duran Duran as an influence include the Dandy Warhols, the Bravery, Dido, Panic! at the Disco, Goldfrapp, and Brandon Flowers of the Killers, who said, "Nick Rhodes is an absolute hero of mine—their records still sound fresh, which is no mean feat as far as synths are concerned." Franz Ferdinand would play "Girls on Film" to make them "feel glamorous".

Rhodes has directly lent his production techniques to Kajagoogoo's debut album White Feathers (1983) and its number one single "Too Shy", and to the Dandy Warhols' fourth album Welcome to the Monkey House (2003). The band's music has been used by several hip-hop artists, most notably the Notorious B.I.G., who sampled Duran Duran's 1986 single "Notorious". Numerous bands have covered their music on record and in concert.

== Band members ==
=== Current members ===
- Nick Rhodes – keyboards, synthesizers, vocal effects, backing vocals (1978–present); electronic percussion (1978–1979)
- John Taylor – bass (1979–1997, 2001–present), backing vocals (1978–1997, 2001–present), guitars (1978–1979, 2023)
- Simon Le Bon – lead vocals, vibraphone on "New Religion", ocarina on "The Chauffeur", marimba on "Last Chance on the Stairway" (1980–present)

=== Former members ===
- Stephen Duffy – lead vocals, drums (1978–1979); bass (1978)
- Simon Colley – bass (1978–1979)
- Roger Taylor – drums, percussion (1979–1985, 2001–2026; session 1994)
- Andy Wickett – lead vocals (1979–1980)
- Alan Curtis – guitars (1979–1980)
- Jeff Thomas – lead vocals (1980)
- Andy Taylor – guitars, backing vocals (1980–1986, 2001–2006; session 2023)
- Warren Cuccurullo – guitars, backing vocals (1989–2001; session/touring 1986–1989; session 2023), bass (1997–2001)
- Sterling Campbell – drums (1989–1991; session/touring 1988–1989)

=== Touring and session musicians ===
- Andy Hamilton – saxophone, keyboards, percussion (1982–1987, 1998, 2003, 2004–2006)
- Raphael De Jesus – percussion (1983–1984)
- B.J. Nelson – backing vocals (1983–1984)
- Charmaine Burch – backing vocals (1983)
- Steve Ferrone – drums (1986–1988)
- Tessa Niles – backing vocals (1986, 1990, 1993, 1998, 2004–2005)
- Stan Harrison – saxophone (1987–1989)
- Mac Gollehon – trumpet (1987–1988)
- Sybil Scoby – backing vocals (1987–1988)
- Curtis King Jr. – backing vocals (1987–1988, 1993–1994)
- Spike Edney – keyboards, trombone (1988–1989)
- Melanie Redmond – backing vocals (1988–1989)
- Jacqui Copland – backing vocals (1988–1989)
- Fergus Gerrand – drums, percussion (1992–1993)
- Yolisa Phahle – violin, keyboards (1993–1994)
- Andy Gangadeen – drums, percussion (1993)
- Lamya – backing vocals (1993–1995)
- Steve Alexander – drums (1995–1997)
- Wes Wehmiller – bass (1997–2001; died 2005)
- Joe Travers – drums (1998–2001)
- John Amato – saxophone (2003–2004)
- Joanne Yearwood – backing vocals (2003–2004)
- Anna Ross – backing vocals (2005–present)
- Dominic Brown – guitars, backing vocals (2006–present; fill-in 2004–2006)
- Simon Willescroft – saxophone (2007–present)
- Chastity Ashley – percussion, backing vocals (2011)
- Dawne Adams – percussion, backing vocals (2011–2012)
- Jessie Wagner – backing vocals (2015–2017)
- Erin Stevenson – backing vocals (2017–2021)
- Graham Coxon – guitars (2021)
- Rachael O'Connor – backing vocals (2021–present)

== Discography ==
Studio albums

- Duran Duran (1981)
- Rio (1982)
- Seven and the Ragged Tiger (1983)
- Notorious (1986)
- Big Thing (1988)
- Liberty (1990)
- Duran Duran (1993)
- Thank You (1995)
- Medazzaland (1997)
- Pop Trash (2000)
- Astronaut (2004)
- Red Carpet Massacre (2007)
- All You Need Is Now (2010)
- Paper Gods (2015)
- Future Past (2021)
- Danse Macabre (2023)

== Tours ==
- The Faster Than Light Tour (1981)
- The Careless Memories Tour (1981)
- The Rio Tour (1982)
- The Sing Blue Silver Tour (1983–84)
- The Strange Behaviour Tour (1987–88)
- The Secret Caravan Club Tour (1988)
- The Big Live Thing Tour (1988–89)
- An Acoustic Evening with Duran Duran (1993)
- The Dilate Your Mind Tour (1993–94)
- The Thank You Tour (1995)
- The Ultra Chrome, Latex and Steel Tour (1997)
- The Greatest and Latest Tour (1998)
- The Let It Flow Tour (1999)
- The Pop Trash Tour (2000)
- The Up Close and Personal Tour (2001)
- The Reunion Tour (2003–04)
- The Astronaut Tour (2005–06)
- The Red Carpet Massacre Tour (2007–08)
- The Summer Tour (2009)
- All You Need Is Now (2011–12)
- 2015 Tour (2015)
- Paper Gods on Tour (2015–17)
- Future Past Tour (2022–23)
- Danse Macabre (2024–25)
- Free to Love Tour (2026)

== Citations ==
=== General and cited references ===
- Bataille, Sébastien (2012). Duran Duran – Les Pop Modernes. France: Fayard. ISBN 978-2-213-66871-0.
- Carver, John (1984). Duran Duran. Anabas Publishing Ltd. ISBN 978-1-85099-001-7.
- David, Maria (1984). Duran Duran. Colour Library Books Ltd. ISBN 978-0-86283-251-3.
- Davis, Stephen (2021). Please Please Tell Me Now: The Duran Duran Story. New York City: Hachette Books. ISBN 978-0-306-84606-9.
- Denisoff, R. Serge (1986). Tarnished Gold: The Record Industry Revisited. Transaction Publishers. ISBN 978-0-88738-618-3.
- Flans, Robyn (1984). Inside Duran Duran. Creskill, NJ: Starbooks/Signet Special. ISBN 978-0-451-82096-9.
- Gaiman, Neil R. M. (1984). Duran Duran: The First Four Years of the Fab Five. Proteus Publishing. ISBN 978-0-86276-260-5.
- Haring, Bruce (2000). Beyond the Charts: MP3 and the Digital Music Revolution. JM Northern Media. ISBN 978-0-9674517-0-1.
- Malins, Steve (2005). Duran Duran, Notorious: The Unauthorised Biography. André Deutsch/Carlton Publishing. ISBN 978-0-233-00137-1.
- Malins, Steve (2013). Duran Duran – Wild Boys: The Unauthorised Biography (Updated ed.). London: André Deutsch. ISBN 978-0-233-00392-4.
- Martin, Susan N. (1984). Duran Duran. Wanderer Books/Simon & Schuster. ISBN 978-0-671-53099-0.
- Shuker, Roy (2001). Understanding Popular Music (2nd ed.). Routledge. ISBN 978-0-415-23509-9.
- Sims, Josh (2001). Rock Fashion (New ed.). Omnibus Press. ISBN 978-0-7119-8749-4.
