= Kevin & Perry Go Large (soundtrack) =

Soundtrack album by Various artists
- Released: April 17, 2000
- Label: Virgin / EMI
- Compiler: Judge Jules

Singles from Kevin & Perry Go Large
- 1. "Big Girl" Released: April 3, 2000

Kevin & Perry Go Large is the soundtrack album for the 2000 comedy film, Kevin & Perry Go Large. It was compiled by Judge Jules and released on Virgin / EMI who also released the single "Big Girl". Some of the songs which appeared in the film are not included or a different remix is used.

== Track listing ==
=== CD 01 ===
All The Hits From The Film

1. Precocious Brats feat. Kevin & Perry - "Big Girl" [2000]
2. Hybrid feat. Chrissie Hynde - "Kid 2000"
3. Jools Holland & His Rhythm & Blues Orchestra feat. Jamiroquai - "I'm In The Mood For Love"
4. The Wiseguys - "Ooh La La" [1998]
5. Fatboy Slim - "Love Island (4/4 Mix)"
6. The Clash - "Straight To Hell"
7. Underworld - "King of Snake (Straight Mate Mix)"
8. Skip Raiders feat. Jada - "Another Day (Perfecto Dub Mix)"
9. Y-Traxx - "Mystery Land (Sickboys Courtyard Remix)"
10. Ayla - "Ayla (DJ Taucher Mix)" [1995]
11. Ver Vlads - "Crazy Ivan"
12. Groove Armada - "Chicago"
13. Gladys Knight - "The Look Of Love"
14. Nightmares on Wax - "Ethnic Majority"
15. Tosca - "F**k Dub"
16. Nightmares on Wax - "Emotion" / "Sweet Harry"
17. Phil Pope and Los Lidos - "Mi Amour"
18. Roger Sanchez - "The Partee"
19. Lange feat. The Morrighan - "Follow Me" [2000]
20. Sunburst - "Eyeball"
21. Southside Spinners - "Luvstruck"

=== CD 02 ===
Kevin & Perry Classic Ibiza Mix

1. Chicane featuring Bryan Adams - "Don't Give Up" [2000]
2. Joey Negro feat. Taka Boom - "Must Be The Music" [1999]
3. Paul Johnson - "Get Get Down" [1999]
4. David Morales presents The Face - "Needin' U"
5. Mousse T. vs Hot 'N' Juicy - "Horny"
6. Perfect Phase presents Those 2 - "Get Wicked"
7. Ruff Driverz presents Arrola - "Dreaming" [1998]
8. Flickman - "Sound of Bamboo"
9. CRW - "I Feel Love (R.A.F. Zone Mix)"
10. Yomanda - "Sunshine"
11. Mauro Picotto - "Lizard (Claxxix Mix)"
12. Signum feat. Scott Mac - "Coming On Strong (Bo Bellow vs. Euphoriah Remix)" [1999]
13. Ariel - "A9"
14. Fragma - "Toca's Miracle"
15. Fragma - "Toca Me (In Petto Mix)"
16. ATB - "9 PM (Till I Come) (Signum Remix)" [1999]
17. Blank & Jones - "After Love (Signum Remix)"
18. Agnelli & Nelson - "Everyday"
19. DJ Tiësto - "Sparkles (Airscape Mix)" [2000]
20. Novy vs. Eniac - "Pumpin' (Eniac 99 Mix)"
21. 2000BC - "Everybody"
22. Precocious Brats feat. Kevin & Perry - "Big Girl (Yomanda Mix)" [2000]

== German / European release ==
In Germany and Europe the soundtrack was named "Kevin & Perry... Tun Es" (translated from German as "Do it"). Also on this release, the second disc has a different track listing.

European CD 02

1. Chicane featuring Bryan Adams - "Don't Give Up"
2. Stella Brown - "Every Woman Needs Love"
3. Those 2 - "Get Wicked"
4. Ruff Driverz presents Arrola - "Dreaming"
5. CRW - "I Feel Love (R.A.F. Zone Mix)"
6. Yomanda - "Sunshine"
7. Mauro Picotto - "Lizard (Claxxix Mix)"
8. Signum feat. Scott Mac - "Coming On Strong"
9. Ariel - "A9"
10. Fragma - "Toca's Miracle"
11. Fragma - "Toca Me (In Petto Mix)"
12. Agnelli & Nelson - "Everyday (Lange Mix)"
13. DJ Tiësto - "Sparkles (Airscape Mix)"
14. Timo Maas - "Der Schieber"
15. Quivver - "She Does (Quivver Mix)"
16. Aurora - "Hear You Calling (En Motion Mix)"
17. Planet Perfecto - "Bullet in the Gun"
18. The Thrillseekers - "Synaesthesia (En Motion Mix)"
19. 2000BC - "Everybody"

== Charts ==
Chart (2000–2003)	Peak position
UK Compilation Albums (OCC)	4
UK Soundtrack Albums (OCC)	4

== Certifications ==
Certifications for Kevin & Perry Go Large
Region	Certification	Certified units/sales
United Kingdom (BPI)	Gold	100,000^{^}
^{^} Shipments figures based on certification alone.

== See also ==
- Kevin & Perry Go Large
- Judge Jules
