= JJ Bird =

British boxer (born 1986)

Personal information
- Nickname: JJ
- Nationality: British
- Born: Joe-John Bird; 9 September 1986 (age 40) Peterborough, England, U.K.
- Height: 6 ft 1 in (1.85 m)
- Weight: Light-Middleweight

Boxing career
- Stance: Orthodox

Boxing record
- Total fights: 14
- Wins: 6
- Losses: 6
- Draws: 2

Joe-John Daniel "JJ" Bird (born 9 September 1986) is a British professional boxer who is also known for being a contestant in the eleventh series of the then Channel 4 reality television series Big Brother.

Bird started his boxing career at the age of 14, joining Peterborough Phoenix ABC, run by Gary De Roux. In January 2007, Bird was granted a professional boxer's licence, and made his boxing debut a month later, beating Frank Celebi on points. He won his next two fights on points, before suffering his first defeat at the hands of Paul Morby in Portsmouth in November 2007. He has also had two televised fights, both in 2008, fighting David Walker on Sky Sports, as well as Steve O'Meara on ITV4. To date, Bird has a professional record of 14 fights with six wins, six losses, and two draws although has not boxed for over a year.

He has also made several television appearances outside of the ring, appearing as a contestant on the respective gameshows Golden Balls, This Time Tomorrow, and The Cube. Most notably, in July 2010, Bird entered the Big Brother house in week six, in its eleventh UK series, and subsequently finished fourth.

== Boxing career ==
Bird boxes out of a gym run by former British Featherweight champion Gary De Roux and competes as welterweight/Light-Middleweight. He started his boxing career aged 14 when he joined Peterborough Phoenix ABC run by Gary De Roux, he had his first amateur contest on 21 November 2001 in Great Yarmouth and went on to have 25 amateur contests with 12 wins and 13 losses.. In January 2007, Bird was granted a professional boxer's licence, to be co-managed by De Roux and Dean Powell and made his debut on 23 February 2007 at the East of England Showground on a show promoted by Kevin Sanders. Bird fought and beat Frank Celebi from Bristol on points. Four months later, Bird won his second fight, beating Duncan Cottier on points in his hometown of Peterborough. In September 2007, he won his third consecutive fight since turning professional, winning once again on points, beating Lance Verallo. In Bird's first fight outside of Peterborough, in November 2007, he suffered the first defeat of his boxing career, losing on points to Paul Morby at the Mountbatten Centre in Portsmouth. Bird's fifth and final fight of 2007 ended in a draw, drawing with Tommy Heffron at the Sports Centre in Oldham. On his draw, Bird said "I feel very good about this performance. I am getting a good variety of fights and learning from each one. Now I have to put all those lessons together". Following Bird's draw with Tommy Heffron, he did not return to the ring until June 2008. Bird was set to box Daniel Herdman at the York Hall, but a late switch meant he ended up facing David Walker, a former challenger for British, Commonwealth and European titles rated number 15 in the country. Bird won the fight on points by 39–38, a win described as a "big upset". The victory meant that Bird reached 16th in the British light-middleweight rankings.

However, Bird lost his next fight in September 2008, again on points, 38–39, in a fight against Dale Miles in Newark. After the match-up, Bird said he was "robbed of success", claiming he thought he "won all four rounds". Two months later, he lost on points once again, losing 38–39 to unbeaten Steve O'Meara in a televised fight at the York Hall. Despite the defeat, trainer Gary De Roux said "JJ did the stable proud, I was very happy with his performance and a lot of top people at ringside said it was a cracking fight". Bird returned to the York Hall just three weeks later, losing to Grant Skehill of Wanstead by 37–40. The loss was Bird's third consecutive defeat. He dropped seven pound in weight for his next fight against then–unbeaten Callum Archer in February 2009, winning the fight 79–76 in Birmingham, meaning Bird only lost one round. The victory seemingly revived Bird's title ambitions, as he "stylishly boxed his way to a convincing points win". However, just a month later, Bird lost 37–39 in Kensington to Nathan Graham in a fight that could have earned Bird an area title shot. His loss was said to be "controversial", with trainer De Roux saying, "there is no way JJ lost that fight". In April 2009, Bird fought Rob Kenney, who had won all eight of his previous fights, and "battled" to a 38–38 draw in Wolverhampton. He was scheduled to fight on prizefighter on 15 September 2011. However, just hours before his boxing return match with prizefighter, Bird collapsed backstage and was unable to compete in the match. JJ stated on his Twitter that he was "gutted" about not being able to compete, but "would be back soon".

On 9 March 2012 Bird made his return to the ring with Spencer Oliver in his corner. Despite fighting a fighter who had lost his first twelve fights, Bird was outclassed by his opponent and lost by referees decision after 4 rounds. It has been suggested by people in the game that Bird should consider moving into selling male cosmetics that he appears to wear in pictures featured on his website.

== TV appearances ==
Bird's first televised fight was his points victory against David Walker, with the fight being televised on Sky Sports in June 2008. Bird's fight with Steve O'Meara at York Hall in November 2008 was televised on ITV4.

In 2008, Bird turned to television gameshows in an attempt to fund his boxing career, having not been able to fund his medicals. Bird said "It [medicals] added up to about £700 and I just hadn't got it. I'm only 21 and only pick up an average wage for working in an office". He also auditioned for the new series of Gladiators during the same year, and despite passing the physical side of the audition, he was told that he was "not suitable" in front of the cameras. He subsequently appeared as a contestant on the respective gameshows Golden Balls and This Time Tomorrow. He was also amongst people on The National Lottery: In It to Win It gameshow and was a model on the fashion and music show Frock Me, as well as modelling alongside Amir Khan for Reebok. Bird won £10,000 in September 2009 when he took part in the first series of television gameshow The Cube. A year later, in July 2010, he became a housemate in the eleventh UK series of Big Brother, entering the house in week six, and finished fourth in the series. JJ also appeared in the three-part documentary following Josie Gibson and her Big Brother boyfriend John James Parton in the show named There's Something About Josie, airing for 3 weeks on Channel 5 in May 2011.

== Personal life ==
Bird was born in Peterborough and attended St. John Fisher School in Peterborough. As a teenager, Bird helped coach junior football teams in the Cambridgeshire area, and supports Queens Park Rangers. His parents own a pub in Bretton, and before entering the Big Brother house, Bird was working as a barman.

Bird is friends with Aston Merrygold from JLS.
