= Tess Daly =

English television presenter (born 1969)

Tess Daly MBE
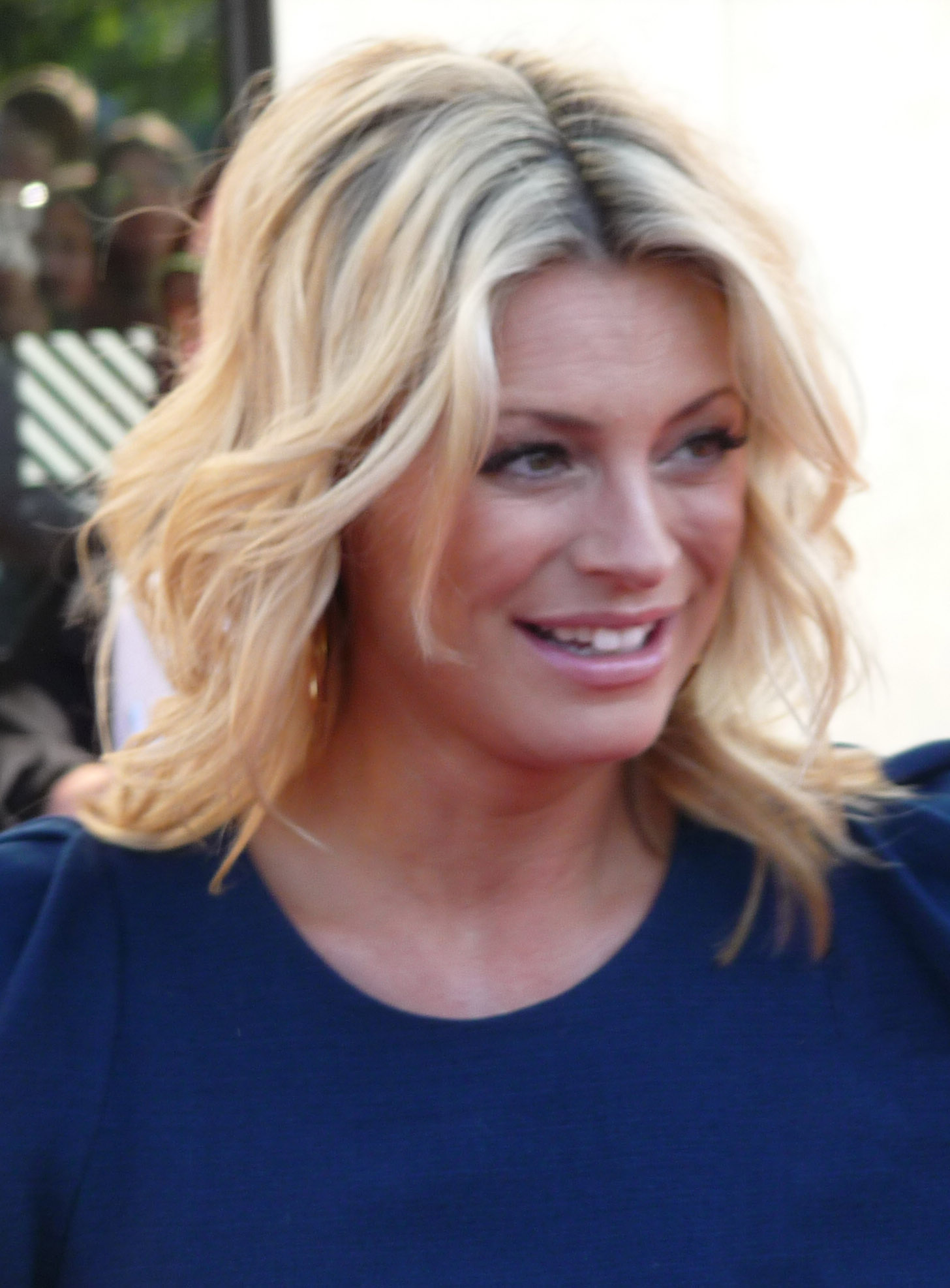
- Daly in 2009
- Born: Helen Elizabeth Daly; 29 March 1969 (age 57); Stockport, Cheshire, England
- Education: New Mills School
- Occupations: Television presenter; model
- Years active: 1990–present
- Spouse: Vernon Kay (m. 2003; sep. 2026)
- Children: 2

Helen Elizabeth "Tess" Daly (born 29 March 1969) is an English television presenter and former model. She is best known for co-presenting the BBC One dancing competition show Strictly Come Dancing (2004–2025). She announced on 23 October 2025, that she would be leaving the show after 21 years, at the end of the current series and the recording of the Christmas Special.

== Early life ==
Helen Elizabeth Daly was born on 29 March 1969 in Stockport, Greater Manchester to textile-factory workers Felix James "Vivian" Daly (1932–2003), who died of emphysema, and Sylvia (née Bradley). She grew up in Birch Vale near New Mills, Derbyshire and attended Hayfield Primary School followed by New Mills Secondary School, where she gained nine O-levels. She has a younger sister, Karen. Daly is of English and Irish descent.

== Career ==
=== Modelling ===
Daly was scouted outside a McDonald's restaurant while waiting for her sister in Manchester. Her first agency already had a "Helen Daly", so she chose to professionally go by the first name of "Tess" rather than her real name.

Six weeks after she turned 18 she undertook her first professional modelling job in Tokyo. After a series of work assignments across Asia and Europe while based in London, she was based in Paris for five years. She then returned to London for six months, before moving to New York for five years.

In 1990, Daly appeared in two Duran Duran videos for the songs "Serious" and "Violence of Summer (Love's Taking Over)", both from the album Liberty. She also appeared nude in the video for The Beloved's 1993 song "Sweet Harmony". Daly later said of her appearance in the "Sweet Harmony" video: "I cringe when I'm reminded of the video. It was a studio of models with nothing but Elastoplast to protect our modesty."

She was later the face of Danone Shape yogurt and also of lingerie company La Senza in the UK and appeared in their Steal the Show Christmas 2009 campaign.

=== Television ===
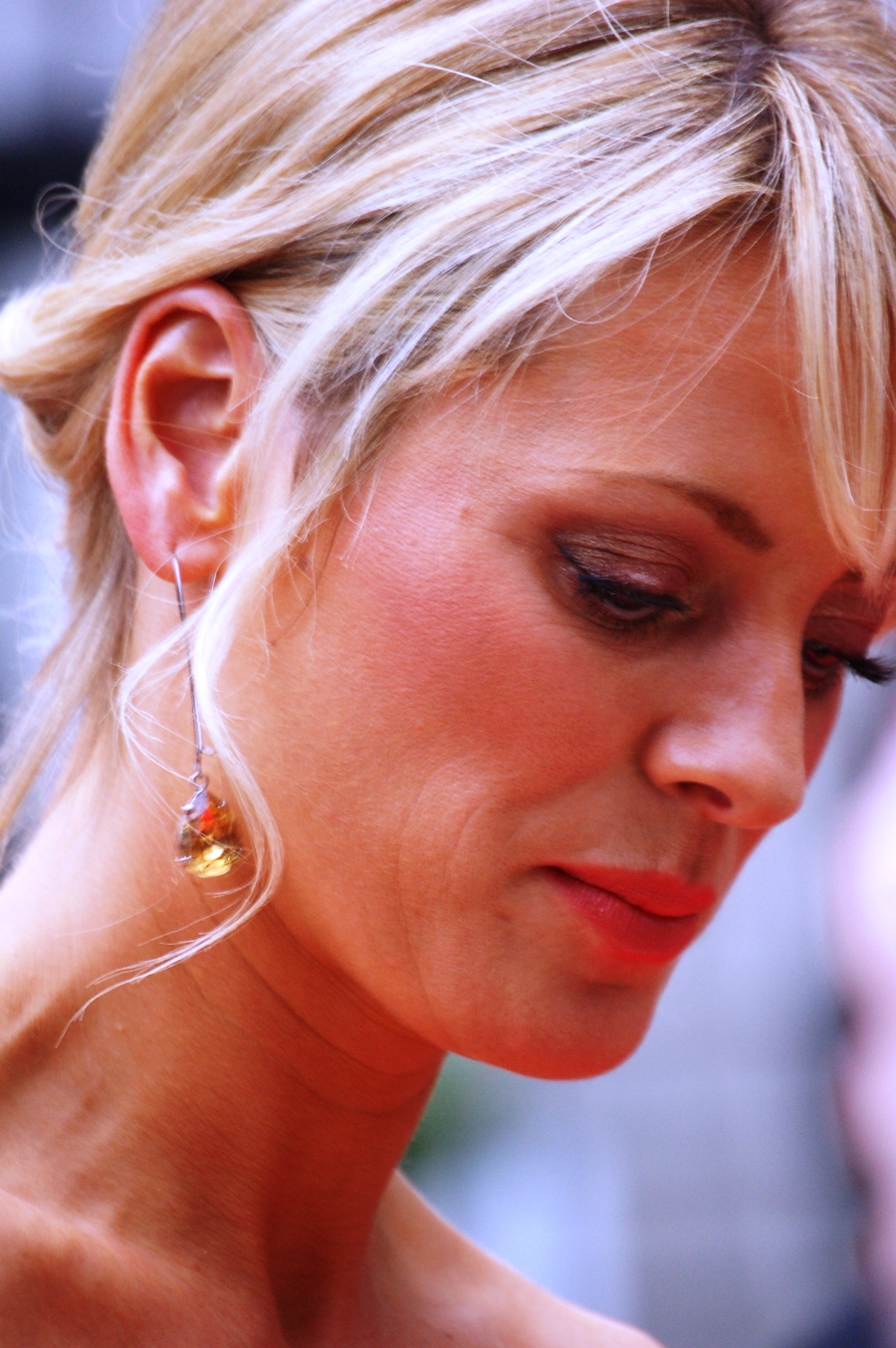
Daly at the 2008 BAFTA Awards

While Daly was living on the Lower East Side in New York City, a friend who arranged red carpet events suggested that she interview the celebrity attendees. After buying a video camera, Daly's first interview was with New York-based Quentin Crisp, author of The Naked Civil Servant. After a few red carpet interviews, in 2000, she sent a showreel to the producers of Channel 4's The Big Breakfast, who immediately contracted her to host the Find Me a Model competition. Since then, she has presented shows including Get Your Kit Off, Singled Out, Smash Hits TV, SMTV Live, Back To Reality and the first series of Make Me a Supermodel with Dave Berry.

In 2003, Daly replaced Ulrika Jonsson as presenter of ITV makeover show Home On Their Own, a show where children made their choice of alterations to their house during the course of a weekend, while their parents went on holiday. Some of the home improvements included an Austin Powers room, individual doorbells for the children and a cinema living room.

Daly co-presented BBC One's Strictly Come Dancing from 2004 to 2025. She initially co-hosted the programme with Bruce Forsyth until he left the show in 2013; from 2014 she co-hosted with Claudia Winkleman. Daly missed the first half of the second series because she had recently given birth to her first daughter. Natasha Kaplinsky, the winner of the previous series, took her place for these episodes. In October 2025, Daly and Winkleman announced that they would leave the show following the conclusion of the latest series and the 2025 Christmas special.

In January 2007, Daly and her husband Vernon Kay co-presented the second series of Just the Two of Us on BBC One.

Daly has also hosted This Time Tomorrow and the National Lottery show broadcast on BBC One. From 2008 to 2019, Daly co-presented the BBC telethon Children in Need alongside Terry Wogan and Fearne Cotton. She also won the special Children in Need version of Strictly Come Dancing against Terry Wogan, where she was partnered with Anton du Beke. On 17 December 2008, Daly co-hosted the Royal Variety Performance.

In November 2013, Daly guest-presented an episode of The One Show alongside Matt Baker. In early 2015, she co-hosted Strictly Come Dancing charity spin-off The People's Strictly for Comic Relief for BBC One. In 2015, Daly co-hosted Being Mum, a new show for AOL alongside Rochelle Humes.

In 2019, she played an unnamed character who hosts fictional TV show The Spotlight, in the CBBC drama, Almost Never.

=== Other work ===
In 2011, Daly's first novel, The Camera Never Lies, a tale of love behind the scenes, was published by Coronet, an imprint of Hodder & Stoughton. It's Up to You New York, Daly's second book, was published in 2013.

In 2013, she became the new face of L'Oréal. In December 2017, Daly became the new face of Vitabiotics' Wellwoman supplement brand. She is the co-founder, with former swimwear model Gayle Lawton, of the swimwear brand Naia Beach.

== Personal life ==
Daly married DJ and television presenter Vernon Kay on 12 September 2003 at St Mary's Catholic Church in Horwich, near Bolton. They have two daughters, born in 2004 and 2009, and have lived in Beaconsfield, Buckinghamshire. In May 2026, Daly and Kay announced on Instagram that they had separated.

Daly was appointed Member of the Order of the British Empire (MBE) in the 2025 Birthday Honours for services to broadcasting.

== Filmography ==
=== Television ===
Year	Title	Channel	Role	Notes
2001	L.A. Pool Party	BBC Choice	Presenter	
2002	Britain's Brainiest Kid	ITV	Presenter	
2002–2003	SMTV Live	ITV/CITV	Co-presenter	
2003	Home On Their Own	ITV/LWT	Presenter	
2004	Back to Reality	Channel 5	Co-presenter	With Richard Bacon
2004	Sport Relief	BBC One	Co-presenter	With Jamie Theakston
2004–2025	Strictly Come Dancing	BBC One	Co-presenter	With Bruce Forsyth (2004–2013) and Claudia Winkleman (2014–2025)
2006–2007	Just the Two of Us	BBC One	Co-presenter	With Vernon Kay
2008	A Night of Heroes: The Sun Military Awards	Sky1	Presenter	Replaced by Amanda Holden and Phillip Schofield from 2009
2008	Royal Variety Performance	BBC One	Co-presenter	
2008	This Time Tomorrow	BBC One	Presenter	
2008	Happy Birthday Brucie!	BBC One	Presenter	One-off TV special
2008–2019	Children in Need	BBC One	Co-presenter	with Sir Terry Wogan, Dermot O'Leary, Greg James and Ade Adepitan
2013-present	The One Show	BBC One	Guest presenter	
2015	The People's Strictly for Comic Relief	BBC One	Co-presenter	With Claudia Winkleman
2015	Being Mum	AOL	Co-presenter	With Rochelle Humes
2018	Sir Bruce: A Celebration	BBC One	Presenter	
2019	Almost Never	CBBC	Host of fictional show The Spotlight	

Guest appearances

- Shooting Stars (2002, 2011)
- Bo' Selecta! (2002)
- Davina (2006)
- The Paul O'Grady Show (2007)
- Celebrity Juice (2012, 2014)
- Would I Lie to You? (2012)
- 8 Out of 10 Cats (2012, 2013)
- That Puppet Game Show (2013)
- Alan Carr: Chatty Man (2013)
- The Guess List (2014)
- Celebrity Squares (2015)
- Through the Keyhole (2015)
- Game of Talents (2021)
- RuPaul's Drag Race UK (2022)
