= The Singles 1986–1995 =

Box set by Duran Duran
- Released: 13 September 2004
- Recorded: 1985–1995
- Label: EMI
- Producer: Duran Duran

Duran Duran chronology
Singles Box Set 1981–1985 (2003)	The Singles 1986–1995 (2004)	Astronaut (2004)

Professional ratings
Review scores
Source	Rating
AllMusic	2.5/5 stars
The Encyclopedia of Popular Music	3/5 stars

The Singles 1986–1995 is a box set by the English pop rock band Duran Duran. Comprising 14 CDs, it was released on 13 September 2004 by EMI and features the singles covering the era from Notorious (1986) to Thank You (1995).

== Critical reception ==
Reviewing the box set for AllMusic, Andy Kellman described the content of all the different versions, remixes and B-sides as an "overkill to anyone but the biggest fan" of Duran Duran, but still found that "there are several goodies scattered around, and it's a convenient way to condense all of those 12" singles, cassingles, and CD5s into one portable package. It's not nearly as valuable as the box covering the earlier singles, but it's a nice companion piece, even if it only gets looked at and pawed over."

== Track listing ==
The box set comprises the following CD singles:

- CD 1: "Notorious" (1986)
1. "Notorious" (45 mix)
2. "Winter Marches On"
3. "Notorious" (extended mix)
4. "Notorious" (Latin Rascals mix)
- CD 2: "Skin Trade" (1987)
1. "Skin Trade" (radio cut)
2. "We Need You"
3. "Skin Trade" (Stretch mix)
4. "Skin Trade" (album version)
- CD 3: "Meet El Presidente" (1987)
1. "Meet El Presidente" (7" remix)
2. "Vertigo (Do the Demolition)"
3. "Meet El Presidente"
4. "Meet El Presidente (Meet El Beat)"
- CD 4: "I Don't Want Your Love" (1988)
1. "I Don’t Want Your Love" (Shep Pettibone 7" mix)
2. "I Don’t Want Your Love" (album version)
3. "I Don’t Want Your Love" (Big mix)
- CD 5: "All She Wants Is" (1988)
1. "All She Wants Is" (45 mix)
2. "I Believe/All I Need to Know"
3. "All She Wants Is" (US master mix)
4. "All She Wants Is" (Euro dub mix)
5. "Skin Trade" (Parisian mix)
- CD 6: "Do You Believe in Shame?" (1989)
1. "Do You Believe in Shame?"
2. "The Krush Brothers LSD Edit"
3. "God (London)"
4. "This Is How a Road Gets Made"
5. "Palomino" (edit)
6. "Drug" (original version)
7. "Notorious" (live – Ahoy Rotterdam 1987)
- CD 7: "Burning the Ground" (1989)
1. "Burning the Ground"
2. "Decadance"
3. "Decadance" (2 Risk E remix 12")
- CD 8: "Violence of Summer (Love's Taking Over)" (1990) [33:47]
1. "Violence of Summer (Love's Taking Over)" (7" mix) – 3:30
2. "Violence of Summer (Love's Taking Over)" (The Story mix) – 3:18
3. "Violence of Summer (Love's Taking Over)" (Power mix) – 4:56
4. "Violence of Summer (Love's Taking Over)" (album version) – 4:20
5. "Violence of Summer (Love's Taking Over)" (The Rock mix) – 4:23
6. "Violence of Summer (Love's Taking Over)" (The Dub Sound of a Powerful mix) – 4:45
7. "Violence of Summer (Love's Taking Over)" (Power Cutdown) – 4:01
8. "Throb" – 4:25
- CD 9: "Serious" (1990) [16:27]
1. "Serious" (single version) – 3:56
2. "Yo Bad Azizi" – 3:03
3. "Water Babies" – 5:35
4. "All Along the Water" – 3:47
- CD 10: "Ordinary World" (1993) [36:38]
1. "Ordinary World" (single version) – 4:43
2. "My Antarctica" – 5:00
3. "Ordinary World" – 5:39
4. "Save a Prayer" (single version) – 5:25
5. "Skin Trade" – 4:25
6. "The Reflex" (7" version) – 4:25
7. "Hungry Like the Wolf" (130 B.P.M. version) – 3:25
8. "Girls on Film" – 3:30
- CD 11: "Come Undone" (1993) [41:15]
1. "Come Undone" (Edit) – 4:15
2. "Ordinary World" (acoustic version) – 5:05
3. "Come Undone" (FGI Thumpin' 12") – 8:14
4. "Come Undone" (La Fin De Siecle) – 5:25
5. "Come Undone" (album version) – 4:31
6. "Rio" (album version) – 5:33
7. "Is There Something I Should Know?" – 4:05
8. "A View to a Kill" – 3:33
- CD 12: "Too Much Information" (1993) [60:22]
1. "Too Much Information" (album version) – 4:56
2. "Come Undone" (live) – 7:35
3. "Notorious" (live) – 5:31
4. "Too Much Information" (Ben Chapman 12" mix) – 6:18
5. "Drowning Man" (D:Ream 12" mix) – 6:29
6. "Drowning Man" (Ambient mix) – 6:45
7. "Too Much Information" (Ben Chapman instrumental 12" mix) – 6:00
8. "Too Much Information" (Deptford dub) – 6:01
9. "Too Much Information" (album version edit) – 3:59
10. "Come Undone" (12" mix Comin' Together) – 7:21
- CD 13: "Perfect Day" (1995) [30:25]
1. "Perfect Day" – 3:53
2. "Femme Fatale" (alternative mix) – 4:14
3. "Love Voodoo" (remix) – 7:36
4. "The Needle and the Damage Done" – 2:03
5. "911 Is a Joke" (alternate version) – 3:49
6. "Make Me Smile (Come Up and See Me)" – 4:56
7. "Perfect Day" (acoustic version) – 3:44
- CD 14: "White Lines" (1995) [39.52]
1. "White Lines" (album version) – 5:26
2. "Save a Prayer" (single version) – 5:25
3. "None of the Above" (drizabone mix) – 4:38
4. "White Lines" (70's club mix) – 7:56
5. "White Lines" (Oakland Fonk mix) – 5:30
6. "White Lines" (Junior Vasquez mix) – 5:37
7. "Ordinary World" (acoustic version – Simon Mayo Show) – 5:16

== Charts ==
Chart (2004)	Peak position
Italy (FIMI)	19
