= Dreaming (Aurora song) =

Single by Aurora

from the album Dreaming
- Released: 2002
- Genre: Pop; dance
- Length: 3:56
- Label: EMI
- Songwriter: Pete Kearney
- Producers: Sacha Collisson; Simon Greenaway; Steve Robson

Aurora singles chronology
"The Day It Rained Forever" (2002)	"Dreaming" (2002)	"Summer Sun" (2006)

"Dreaming" is a single by British electronic dance music group Aurora with vocals by Lizzy Pattinson. It reached number 24 on the UK Singles Chart in 2002.

== Music video ==
There were two video versions for the single. One features Lizzy on a charter bus and singing with an acoustic band.

The other version features Lizzy in a room with mahogany flooring and ceiling. She is singing with a band.

== Track listing ==
UK CDS (2002)

1. Dreaming (3:56)
2. Ordinary World (Acoustic Version) (4:37)
3. Hear You Calling (Acoustic Version) (3:47)

UK 12" Vinyl (2002)

1. Dreaming (Lullaby Mix)
2. Dreaming (Stella Browne Dub Mix)

UK 12" Vinyl Promo (2002)

1. Dreaming (LTI Mix)
2. Dreaming (LTI Instrumental Dub Mix)
3. Dreaming (LTI Radio Edit)

UK DVD Single (2002)

1. Dreaming (The Video)
2. Dreaming (Radio Edit)
3. Aurora Album Medley (In My Skin, Your Mistake, The Day It Rained Forever, This Can't Be Love)
4. Dreaming (Lullaby Mix)
