= In My Skin =

In My Skin may refer to:

- In My Skin (film), a 2002 French horror film created by Marina de Van
- In My Skin (TV series), a 2018 British comedy drama series following a Welsh teenager
- "In My Skin", song by Aurora from the 2002 UK enhanced CD "The Day It Rained Forever"
