= My Antarctica =

1990 song by Duran Duran

- "Ordinary World" UK single B-side label

Song by Duran Duran

from the album Liberty
- Released: 20 August 1990
- Studio: Olympic (London)
- Genre: Synth-pop
- Length: 5:01
- Label: Parlophone
- Songwriters: Simon Le Bon; John Taylor; Nick Rhodes; Warren Cuccurullo; Sterling Campbell
- Producer: Chris Kimsey

Audio video
- "My Antarctica" on YouTube

"My Antarctica" is a song by the English pop rock band Duran Duran from their sixth studio album Liberty, released by Parlophone on 20 August 1990. A mid-tempo synth-pop ballad, the song features glacial synthesisers, ambient reversed guitars, and one of the lead vocalist Simon Le Bon's "most haunting vocal performances".

Although not released as a single, "My Antarctica" has been singled out by both critics and band members as a highlight of Liberty, and has continued to receive retrospective acclaim. It was later included as a B-side to the 1992 single "Ordinary World". Despite its critical recognition, the song has rarely been performed live.

== Composition ==
"My Antarctica" is a mid-tempo synth-pop ballad that the author Steve Malins described as "pulsing" and "ethereal", featuring a "fine vocal performance" by the lead vocalist Simon Le Bon. Jon O'Brien of Classic Pop noted that the producer Chris Kimsey allowed Duran Duran "room to breathe" on the track, which combines "glacial synths and a desolate piano hook" with "one of Le Bon's most haunting vocal performances". The keyboardist Nick Rhodes highlighted the guitarist Warren Cuccurullo's contributions, describing his "ambient reversed guitars" as "incredibly beautiful", and calling Cuccurullo "a magician, as well as a musician". Lyrically, Le Bon has chosen not to reveal the song's meaning, stating that "the song is the statement" and that other people's interpretations are what matter.

== Release ==
"My Antarctica" was released by Parlophone on 20 August 1990 as the sixth track on Duran Duran's sixth studio album, Liberty. It was not issued as a single, though both Kimsey and Paul Sinclair of SuperDeluxeEdition later expressed the view that it should have been. Kimsey stated that "My Antarctica" and "Serious" should have been chosen as singles instead of "Violence of Summer (Love's Taking Over)". Sinclair similarly wrote that while EMI Records may have been reluctant to release a slower song as a lead single, choosing "Violence of Summer" over "My Antarctica" was "madness". An instrumental variation of the song, titled "Throb", was used as the B-side to the "Violence of Summer" single. "My Antarctica" was later selected as a B-side to the 1992 single "Ordinary World", which helped revive the band's commercial success.

== Legacy ==
Although Liberty is often regarded as one of Duran Duran's weaker albums, "My Antarctica" has been singled out by both critics and band members as a highlight, continuing to receive praise. Malins identified it as one of the three standout tracks on the album, while Le Bon described it as "one of my favourite Duran Duran songs, ever", calling it "a beautiful and emotional song". Rhodes referred to it as "a beautiful ballad", and while noting some reservations about the mix, described the song itself as "exquisite". Sinclair called it "THE best song from Liberty by a country mile", suggesting it "could have been a classic in the vein of 'Save A Prayer'" had it been released as a single, and praised Le Bon's lyrics as "brilliant". Rik Flynn of Classic Pop ranked it as the 26th best Duran Duran song, writing that "The Durans know how to nail a good ballad". O'Brien noted that despite the band's apparent appreciation for the song, it has been largely absent from their live performances.

== Personnel ==
Duran Duran

- Simon Le Bon – lead vocals
- Nick Rhodes – keyboards, synthesisers
- John Taylor – bass guitar
- Warren Cuccurullo – guitar
- Sterling Campbell – drums

Technical

- Chris Kimsey – producer
- Christopher Marc Potter – engineer
- Michael Butterworth – assistant engineer
- Ted Jensen – mastering
