= The Day It Rained Forever =

Single by Aurora

from the album Dreaming
- Released: 2002
- Length: 4:14
- Label: EMI
- Songwriter(s): Steve Robson
- Producer(s): Sacha Collisson; Simon Greenaway

Aurora singles chronology
"Ordinary World" (2000)	"The Day It Rained Forever" (2002)	"Dreaming" (2002)

"The Day It Rained Forever" is a single by British electronic dance music group Aurora with vocals by Lizzy Pattinson. It reached number 29 on the UK Singles Chart in 2002.

== Music video ==
The video for the single features Sacha Collisson and Simon Greenaway playing guitar and keyboard with Pattinson singing in a house that is floating on a seemingly infinite ocean. Filmed in Cape Town, South Africa.

== Track listing ==
UK CDM (2002)

1. The Day It Rained Forever (Radio Edit) (4:14)
2. The Day It Rained Forever (Lasgo Vocal) (8:09)
3. The Day It Rained Forever (Flip & Fill Vocal) (6:46)

UK CD (Enhanced) (2002)

1. The Day It Rained Forever (Radio Edit) (4:14)
2. Your Mistake (Radio Edit 2) (2:54)
3. In My Skin (3:52)
4. Video - The Day It Rained Forever

UK 12" Vinyl (Double) (2002)

1. The Day It Rained Forever (Thick Club Mix)
2. The Day It Rained Forever (Deep In My Head Mix)
3. The Day It Rained Forever (Thick Dub)
4. The Day It Rained Forever (Deep In My Dub Mix)

UK 12" Vinyl (Double) Promo (2002)

1. The Day It Rained Forever (Lasgo Vocal)
2. The Day It Rained Forever (Flip & Fill Vocal)
3. The Day It Rained Forever (Monoboy Dubstramental)
4. The Day It Rained Forever (Monoboy Vocal)
5. The Day It Rained Forever (Flip & Fill Instrumental)
6. The Day It Rained Forever (Radio Edit)
7. The Day It Rained Forever (Flip & Fill Radio Edit)

UK 12" Vinyl (2002)

1. The Day It Rained Forever (Lasgo Vocal) (8:09)
2. The Day It Rained Forever (Flip & Fill Vocal) (6:46)
