= Hear You Calling =

2000 single by Aurora

Single by Aurora

from the album Aurora
- Released: 1999 / 24 January 2000
- Recorded: UK
- Genre: Progressive trance
- Length: 3:42
- Label: Positiva
- Songwriter(s): Sacha Collisson, Simon Greenaway

Aurora singles chronology
"Hear You Calling" (1999)	"Ordinary World" (2000)

"Hear You Calling" is the debut single by English electronic duo Aurora, released in 1999. It initially reached No. 71 on the UK Singles Chart, but a re-release the following year charted higher, reaching the top 20 at No. 17 in January 2000. It also reached No. 1 on the UK Dance Singles Chart.

== Track listing ==
- Germany CDM (2000)
1. "Hear You Calling" (Radio Cut) (3:44)
2. "Hear You Calling" (Dark Moon Radio Cut) (3:15)
3. "Hear You Calling" (Fire and Ice Radio Cut) (3:10)
4. "Hear You Calling" (Dark Moon Remix) (6:22)
5. "Hear You Calling" (Condor Mix) (10:33)
6. "Hear You Calling" (Fire and Ice Remix) (6:58)
- Germany 12" #1 (2000)
1. "Hear You Calling" (Dark Moon Remix) (6:23)
2. "Hear You Calling" (Original Mother Earth Mix) (8:44)
3. "Hear You Calling" (Fire and Ice Remix) (6:55)
- Germany 12" #2 (2000)
1. "Hear You Calling" (En Motion Remix) (7:25)
2. "Hear You Calling" (Condor Remix) (10:35)
- UK 12" #1 (1999)
1. "Hear You Calling" (Original Mother Earth Mix) (8:45)
2. "Hear You Calling" (Fire & Ice Remix) (6:56)
- UK 12" #2 (1999)
1. "Hear You Calling" (Origin Remix) (9:48)
2. "Hear You Calling" (Blue Room Remix) (9:36)
- UK CDM (2000)
1. "Hear You Calling" (Radio Cut) (3:44)
2. "Hear You Calling" (En Motion Remix) (7:25)
3. "Hear You Calling" (Origin Remix) (9:36)
- Australia CDM (1999)
1. "Hear You Calling" (Radio Cut) (3:42)
2. "Hear You Calling" (Original Mother Earth Mix) (8:45)
3. "Hear You Calling" (En Motion Remix) (7:25)
4. "Hear You Calling" (Origin Remix) (8:38)
5. "Hear You Calling" (Blue Room Remix) (9:36)
- Australia 12" promo (1999)
1. "Hear You Calling" (En-Motion Mix) (7:26)
2. "Hear You Calling" (Blue Room Mix) (8:37)

== Charts ==
Chart (2000)	Peak position
UK Singles Chart (OCC)	17
UK Dance Chart (OCC)	1
