= Ordinary World (song) =

1992 single by Duran Duran

Single by Duran Duran

from the album Duran Duran
- B-side: "My Antarctica"
- Released: 19 December 1992
- Studio: Privacy (Battersea, England); Maison Rouge (London, England)
- Genre: Soft rock
- Length: 5:39 (album version); 4:43 (single version)
- Label: Parlophone
- Songwriter: Duran Duran
- Producers: Duran Duran; John Jones

Duran Duran singles chronology
"Serious" (1990)	"Ordinary World" (1992)	"Come Undone" (1993)

Music video
- "Ordinary World" on YouTube

"Ordinary World" is a song by the English pop rock band Duran Duran, released on 19 December 1992 by Capitol Records as the first single from their second self-titled album (1993), commonly known as the Wedding Album. It was later released in the UK by EMI and Parlophone on 18 January 1993. The ballad, both written by the band and co-produced with John Jones, topped the US Billboard Top 40/Mainstream chart, the Canadian RPM 100 Hit Tracks chart, the Italian and Israeli Singles Chart. It also peaked at number three on the Billboard Hot 100, number two in Iceland and Sweden, and number six on the UK Singles Chart. The song's music video was directed by Nick Egan and filmed in California.

The song was nominated for Ivor Novello Award for Best Song Musically and Lyrically and won the Performing Right Society award for the year's most performed song in May 1994. Lead vocalist Simon Le Bon sang the song with Luciano Pavarotti at a benefit concert for War Child. "Ordinary World" remains one of Duran Duran's most popular songs and, in October 2021, was their second-most streamed song in the UK.

== Background ==
By the early 1990s, Duran Duran's career was in decline following the underwhelming reception of their 1990 album Liberty. The album and its singles struggled both commercially and critically, while internal challenges added to the uncertainty. Drummer Sterling Campbell departed, bassist John Taylor and keyboardist Nick Rhodes faced personal difficulties, and singer Simon Le Bon considered stepping away from music. Amid these struggles, guitarist Warren Cuccurullo took the lead in revitalising the band, converting his Battersea home into a makeshift studio to provide creative control without the high costs of a traditional studio they used to record all of their albums.

== Development and recording ==
The group wanted to have the time to be creative without spending hundreds of thousands of pounds in a studio. They asked me if I thought we could make a record in a living room. My response was that we certainly could.

— John Jones, April 1993

In January 1991, Duran Duran began working on their next album at Cuccurullo's home studio, Privacy. Equipped with a sequencer, drum machine, synthesisers, and Cuccurullo's extensive guitar setup, the band, along with producer John Jones who joined later sessions, started composing and demoing songs. As they began working on new material, the band faced lingering low morale from Liberty's failure, but the development of "Ordinary World" became a turning point, restoring confidence in their musical direction following the uprising of other genres like grunge. It was one of the first ideas they worked on in the studio. Pre-production involved recording on an Akai MG1214 console and 12-track recorder, with live demos captured using Shure SM58 microphones. The intention was to produce about 15 song demos to receive early feedback from their record label Capitol-EMI. One of these songs was "Ordinary World". The setup was later upgraded with two Akai ADAM digital 12-track recorders and a DDA DMR12 console to facilitate using demo recordings in the final tracks.

The writing process for "Ordinary World" began with Rhodes playing chords that Cuccurullo altered, leading Le Bon to quickly develop the chorus melody. The verse took longer, with Cuccurullo refining the chord structure. The musical composition was completed within three days. Rhodes reflected on the process that "It came from air, from space. You know, we were just playing and it came out and somehow all these bits that make up the song came together in one instant." Le Bon's lyrics, built around the phrase "ordinary world," were inspired by the desire to regain a familiar and comfortable reality. The initial demo featured straightforward elements: stereo drums, single bass, doubled acoustic guitar, a stereo pad, and a simple vocal. Jones managed programming, engineering, and instrumental contributions. Overdubs included bass guitar through a Zoom processor, raunchy power chords from Cuccurullo's Steinberger guitar, and keyboard parts from an Ensoniq VFX, Akai S1000, and Roland D-50. Le Bon recorded the lead vocal while standing in the room with the rest of the band, creating a collaborative environment where harmonies and spontaneous ideas were sometimes incorporated. The vocal arrangement became a composite due to changes in song structure. The DDA DMR12 console, known for its quiet performance and effective EQ, was used extensively during recording.

After initially using a drum machine rhythm throughout the recording process, the band relocated to Maison Rouge Studios in London, where Steve Ferrone, engineered by Tony Taverner, recorded live drums for "Ordinary World" and other tracks in just a few hours. Due to track limitations, Jones prepared by mixing the songs without the programmed drum parts and transferring them to an Akai DD1000 digital recorder synchronised with SMPTE timecode. At Maison Rouge, they used a 24-track Dolby SR analogue tape striped with the same timecode, allowing Ferrone to record his live drum performances in perfect synchronisation with the existing tracks. Following the drum sessions, Rhodes and Jones refined the string and keyboard parts, making final adjustments to the arrangements. Additional tweaks to the drum and acoustic guitar parts were made using the Akai DD1000.

=== Mixing ===
After the bulk of the recording was completed, the song entered the mixing stage. Initially, the band attempted to mix the track themselves using home studio equipment and the newly installed DDA DMR12 desk at Privacy Studios. However, they struggled to achieve the desired sound, prompting a move to professional studios like Maison Rouge. Despite multiple mixing attempts by Steve MacMillion in the US, Jones and Dee Long in the UK, and Queen's producer David Richards at Mountain Studios in Montreux, the band remained unsatisfied. Cuccurullo, however, recalled: "[G]etting the mixes back from [D]avid's [M]ontreaux [sic] studio was one of the most amazing memories [I] have of the entire project. [D]avid made stuff sound like you'd taken drugs before having a listen... obviously, much healthier than actually taking drugs." They finally found a satisfactory mix when David Leonard's version was cut at Townhouse Studios. Unexpectedly, Richards later created another mix while in London for the Freddie Mercury Tribute Concert for AIDS Awareness in April 1992. The band preferred this version, which became the final release of "Ordinary World".

== Lyrics ==
"Ordinary World"
Sample of "Ordinary World" from Duran Duran's 1993 album Duran Duran.

The lyrics of "Ordinary World" address themes of grief, resilience, and the search for normality following personal loss. Written by Simon Le Bon, the song reflects his emotional response to the death of his close friend David Miles, who died from a drug overdose in 1986. It is the second of three Duran Duran songs Le Bon wrote about Miles, following "Do You Believe in Shame?" from Big Thing (1988) and preceding "Out of My Mind" from Medazzaland (1997). Le Bon stated that it is about "somebody who feels that he's suddenly woken up in a bit of a crazy world and wants to regain the ordinary world that he once knew—something that he can recognise and feel comfortable with". Kristi York Wooten of Paste described the lyrics as a "desire to find normalcy after the shock and grief of loss". According to Al Melchior of American Songwriter, the lyrics express the depth of Le Bon's sorrow while maintaining a sense of hope for eventual healing. AllMusic's Donald A. Guarisco observed that the lyrics of "Ordinary World" portray a man coping with the pain of a breakup by reconnecting with the outside world. He also highlighted that it adopts a straightforward and mature tone, differing sharply from the vibrant and playful language found in their earlier hits like "The Reflex".

== Release and reception ==
"Ordinary World" was first leaked by Capitol Records to a few US radio stations in mid-1992, months ahead of its intended release date. In August 1992, Radio & Records reported that a Tampa station received a cease and desist order after playing the song before its official debut. Despite this, the response to the leak was overwhelming, with DJs reporting hundreds of listener calls within the first day. Capitol decided to rush-release the track, and it officially debuted in the US on 19 December 1992. The song made its first chart appearance at number 23 on Billboard's Modern Rock Tracks chart the week of 26 December, eventually peaking at number two. It reached number three on the Billboard Hot 100, number one on the Top 40/Mainstream chart, and number six on the UK Singles Chart following its release in the UK by EMI and Parlophone on 18 January 1993.

Among contemporary reviews, J. D. Considine of The Baltimore Sun remarked on the song's unexpected success, calling it "nothing short of miraculous." The Independent described the track as "a classic of transcendent beauty," while Cathi Unsworth of Melody Maker characterized it as "sober, melancholy, and absurdly touching." Tony Fletcher for Newsday stated that the "excellently crafted" ballad shows the group "to be capable of delivering the goods. And as an added irony for a band that was introduced by MTV when radio wouldn't touch it, this particular song exploded across radio's many formats before a video was even made." Ann Powers from The New York Times declared it as "a smooth yet pathos-ridden ballad". Sam Wood from Philadelphia Inquirer called it a "sober ballad". Peter Howell from Toronto Star remarked that the "ethereal" debut single "has all the earmarks of an unstoppable radio hit". Mark Jenkins from The Washington Post found that such ballads as "Ordinary World" "achieve melodic sufficiency".

In a retrospective review, Donald A. Guarisco of AllMusic described it as having "a warm ballad feel," blending "elegant verses full of entrancing repeating-note hooks with a rousing chorus built on soaring runs of ascending notes." Guarisco also highlighted Simon Le Bon's vocal delivery as "rich in emotion but tastefully restrained". Andrea Odintz of Rolling Stone described the song as "dreamy" and compared its emotional effect to Duran Duran's earlier hit "Save a Prayer".

== Music video ==
The music video for "Ordinary World" was commissioned by Dilly Gent for Parlophone and directed by Nick Egan, with Nina Dluhy producing for Limelight Films in Los Angeles. It was released on 18 January 1993.

Filming took place in two stages during December 1992. The first stage captured footage of the band performing on a white stage and walking through the Huntington Gardens in San Marino, California, all in a single day. Afterward, a performance cut was edited for projection, and the production team returned to the location a week later. The exterior scenes were filmed using the gardens' various themed sections as backdrops. During the second stage of filming, projections of the band were incorporated into the garden scenes. Egan stated that these projections were intended to give the band an "omnipresent, almost dreamlike" presence over a couple's wedding day. Music Week described the location as a "vast botanical garden" featuring flora representing different countries, such as roses for England and cacti for Australia. The publication also reported that large flower projections were layered over performance footage using a light painting technique. Production concluded amid a sudden rainstorm that flooded the set with nearly a foot of water as the crew worked to protect cables and equipment.

Egan cited the film director Federico Fellini's Juliet of the Spirits as an influence on the video's visual style, explaining that the bride's hat was inspired by the film rather than, as some speculated, a lampshade. The tuxedo-style wedding dress, based on a Giorgio Armani fashion design and changed from black to white, became one of the stylist's most requested recreations. Another change involved a scene showing a wedding band composed of older musicians intended to represent Duran Duran in the future that was removed. Egan explained that the idea of the band members performing at weddings was not viewed as a favorable depiction of their legacy.

== Track listings ==
- UK 7-inch and cassette single
1. "Ordinary World" (single version) – 4:41
2. "My Antarctica" – 5:06
- UK CD1
1. "Ordinary World" (single version)
2. "Save a Prayer"
3. "Skin Trade"
4. "My Antarctica"
- UK CD2
1. "Ordinary World" (single version)
2. "The Reflex"
3. "Hungry Like the Wolf"
4. "Girls on Film"
- US CD single
1. "Ordinary World" – 5:39
2. "My Antarctica" – 5:06
3. "Save a Prayer" – 5:33
4. "UMF" – 5:31
- US and Canadian cassette single
1. "Ordinary World" – 5:39
2. "Ordinary World" (acoustic version) – 5:05
3. "Save a Prayer ('Til the Morning After)" (live) – 6:12
- Australian CD single
1. "Ordinary World" (single version) – 4:41
2. "My Antarctica" – 5:06
3. "Save a Prayer" – 5:33
4. "The Reflex" – 4:25
- The Singles 1986–1995 box set
1. "Ordinary World" (single version) – 4:43
2. "My Antarctica" – 5:00
3. "Ordinary World" – 5:39
4. "Save a Prayer" (single version) – 5:25
5. "Skin Trade" – 4:25
6. "The Reflex" (7-inch version) – 4:25
7. "Hungry Like the Wolf" – 3:25
8. "Girls on Film" – 3:30

== Personnel ==
Adapted from Duran Duran's liner notes, except where noted:

Duran Duran

- Simon Le Bon – vocals
- John Taylor – bass guitar
- Nick Rhodes – keyboards
- Warren Cuccurullo – acoustic and electric guitar

Additional musicians

- John Jones – keyboards
- Steve Ferrone – drums

Production

- Duran Duran – production
- John Jones – production
- David Richards – mixing
- Tony Taverner – live drum session engineering
- Stuart Every – assistant live drum session engineer
- Kevin Metcalfe – mastering

== Charts ==
=== Weekly charts ===
1993 weekly chart performance for "Ordinary World"
Chart (1993)	Peak position
Australia (ARIA)	18
Austria (Ö3 Austria Top 40)	15
Belgium (Ultratop 50 Flanders)	20
Canada Retail Singles (The Record)	2
Canada Top Singles (RPM)	1
Canada Adult Contemporary (RPM)	10
Denmark (IFPI)	7
Estonia (Eesti Top 20)	7
Europe (Eurochart Hot 100)	10
Europe (European Hit Radio)	1
Finland (Suomen virallinen lista)	18
France (SNEP)	6
France Airplay (SNEP)	1
Germany (GfK)	16
Iceland (Íslenski Listinn Topp 40)	2
Ireland (IRMA)	3
Israel (Israeli Singles Chart)	1
Italy (Musica e dischi)	1
Netherlands (Dutch Top 40)	14
Netherlands (Single Top 100)	16
New Zealand (Recorded Music NZ)	3
Norway (VG-lista)	5
Spain Airplay (Top 40 Radio)	1
Sweden (Sverigetopplistan)	2
Switzerland (Schweizer Hitparade)	11
UK Singles (Official Charts)	6
UK Airplay (Music Week)	1
US Billboard Hot 100	3
US Adult Contemporary (Billboard)	14
US Modern Rock Tracks (Billboard)	2
US Top 40/Mainstream (Billboard)	1
US Cash Box Top 100	1

2026 weekly chart performance for "Ordinary World"
Chart (2026)	Peak position
Israel International Airplay (Media Forest)	20
Norway Airplay (IFPI Norge)	93

=== Year-end charts ===
1993 year-end chart performance for "Ordinary World"
Chart (1993)	Position
Canada Top Singles (RPM)	7
Canada Adult Contemporary (RPM)	72
Europe (Eurochart Hot 100)	26
Europe (European Hit Radio)	6
France Airplay (SNEP)	9
Germany (Media Control)	69
Iceland (Íslenski Listinn Topp 40)	19
Israel (Israeli Singles Chart)	13
Netherlands (Dutch Top 40)	94
Netherlands (Single Top 100)	84
Sweden (Topplistan)	42
UK Singles (OCC)	65
UK Airplay (Music Week)	25
US Billboard Hot 100	34
US Cash Box Top 100	13

== Certifications ==
Certifications and sales for "Ordinary World"
Region	Certification	Certified units/sales
Denmark (IFPI Danmark)	Gold	45,000^{‡}
Italy (FIMI) sales since 2009	Gold	35,000^{‡}
New Zealand (RMNZ)	Platinum	30,000^{‡}
Spain (Promusicae)	Gold	30,000^{‡}
United Kingdom (BPI)	Platinum	600,000^{‡}
United States (RIAA)	Gold	500,000
^{‡} Sales+streaming figures based on certification alone.

== Release history ==
Release dates and formats for "Ordinary World"
Region	Date	Format(s)	Label(s)	Ref.
United States	19 December 1992	CD; cassette	Capitol	
United Kingdom	18 January 1993	7-inch vinyl; CD; cassette	Parlophone; EMI	
Japan	24 February 1993	Mini-CD	EMI	

== Aurora version ==
"Ordinary World"

Single by Aurora featuring Naimee Coleman

from the album Dreaming
- B-side: "Hear You Calling" (remix)
- Released: 11 September 2000
- Genre: Trance
- Length: 4:26
- Label: Positiva
- Songwriters: Nick Rhodes; Simon Le Bon; Warren Cuccurullo; John Taylor
- Producers: Sacha Collisson; Simon Greenaway

Aurora singles chronology
"Hear You Calling" (1999)	"Ordinary World" (2000)	"The Day It Rained Forever" (2000)

British electronic music group Aurora released a trance version of "Ordinary World" featuring Irish singer-songwriter Naimee Coleman in 2000. This version, released on 11 September that year, charted at No. 5 in the United Kingdom, No. 6 in Ireland, and No. 47 in Germany. In the United States, it appeared on the Billboard Hot Dance Club Play chart, peaking at No. 37 in June 2001.

=== Track listings ===
- UK CD and cassette single
1. "Ordinary World" (radio edit) – 4:26
2. "Ordinary World" (Above & Beyond remix) – 8:25
3. "Hear You Calling" (Dark Moon remix) – 6:23
- UK 12-inch single

A1. "Ordinary World" (Condor remix edit) – 8:01
AA1. "Ordinary World" (Above & Beyond remix edit) – 6:45
AA2. "Ordinary World" (Gizeh remix edit) – 4:54

- European CD single
1. "Ordinary World" (radio edit) – 4:26
2. "Ordinary World" (Condor remix) – 9:08
- German maxi-CD single
1. "Ordinary World" (original radio mix) – 4:24
2. "Ordinary World" (Floorfilla radio cut) – 3:47
3. "Ordinary World" (club mix) – 9:06
4. "Ordinary World" (Floorfilla remix) – 6:50
5. "Ordinary World" (Gizeh mix) – 7:01
6. "Ordinary World" (DJ Janis vs. Plus One remix) – 8:04
- Australian CD single
1. "Ordinary World" (radio edit) – 4:26
2. "Ordinary World" (extended mix) – 8:16
3. "Ordinary World" (Condor remix) – 9:08
4. "Ordinary World" (Above & Beyond remix) – 8:25
5. "Hear You Calling" (Dark Moon remix) – 6:23

=== Charts ===
==== Weekly charts ====
Chart (2000–2001)	Peak position
Europe (Eurochart Hot 100)	26
Germany (GfK)	47
Ireland (IRMA)	6
Ireland Dance (IRMA)	2
Scottish Singles Sales (Official Charts)	4
UK Singles (Official Charts)	5
UK Dance (Official Charts)	5
US Dance Club Play (Billboard)	37

==== Year-end charts ====
Chart (2000)	Position
UK Singles (OCC)	178

== Other Covers ==
- American Christian rock band Red covered the song on their 2009 album Innocence & Instinct
