= This Time Tomorrow =

British game show

- Genre: Game show
- Presented by: Tess Daly
- Country of origin: United Kingdom
- Original language: English
- No. of series: 1
- No. of episodes: 8

Production
- Running time: 35-38 minutes
- Production company: BBC Scotland

Original release
- Network: BBC One
- Release: 5 July – 23 August 2008

Related
- The National Lottery Draws

This Time Tomorrow is a BBC National Lottery game show broadcast on BBC One from 5 July to 23 August 2008, hosted by Tess Daly.

== Ratings ==
Episode no.	Airdate	Viewers (millions)	BBC One weekly ranking
1	5 July 2008	5.25	14
2	12 July 2008	4.41	16
3	19 July 2008	4.26	18
4	26 July 2008	3.95	20
5	2 August 2008	4.77	12
6	9 August 2008	5.28	9
7	16 August 2008	—N/a	—N/a
8	23 August 2008	—N/a	—N/a
