= Gary De'Roux =

Personal information
- Nickname: Dynamite
- Nationality: British
- Born: Gary De'Roux; 4 November 1962 (age 63) Manchester
- Height: 5 ft 6 in (1.68 m)
- Weight: Featherweight

Boxing career
- Stance: Orthodox

Boxing record
- Total fights: 22
- Wins: 13
- Win by KO: 10
- Losses: 8
- Draws: 1

Gary De'Roux (born 4 November 1962) is a retired professional boxer, boxing trainer, manager and British Boxing Board of Control Ltd Inspector.

Boxed as an amateur for the Focus ABC, Peterborough - Trainer : Terry Shufflebottom and Raf Tuccillo. Made his amateur debut as an Eastern Counties Select squad member on 10 March 1984, aged 21 in Jersey, Channel Islands! Won KO round 1. His first five amateur fights were won by KO, earning him the nickname "Dynamite"

Gary De'Roux (Peterborough) amateur record Runner up Eastern Counties Featherweight Championships in 1985 and 1986. Winning 16 of 21 fights, including one exhibition fight.

Turned professional in 1986. Made his debut on Sept 25th 1986 against Manchester's Tony Carter in Peterborough at the Wirrina Stadium in a planned 6 rounder. He won in the second round with the referee stopping the contest, his following 2 fights ended in a similar fashion, making him one of the most exciting all action fighters to come out of Peterborough.

Historic Boxing Fact - Boxing historian Harold Alderman MBE. Gary De'Roux won the Southern Area Featherweight Title on 14 December 1990 and went on to make history, by becoming the only Peterborough boxer, to not only contest a British title but to actually win it. In what was seen as one of the most exciting British title fights of recent years on 5 March 1991. (Source, Harry Mullan, Boxing News 15 March 1991). Knocking out holder Sean Murphy (St Albans) and getting his name on the coveted Lord Lonsdale British Championship belt. Although losing in his first defence to Colin McMillan (Barking), Gary made his claim as Peterboroughs' best ever, the night he won the British Featherweight title. Gary De'Roux later revived amateur boxing in Peterborough in 1998 with the formation of the Phoenix ABC producing amateur champions of his own. (Source, Harold Alderman)

Gary De'Roux (Peterborough) professional record British Featherweight - 9 st (126 lbs) Champion, 5 March 1991 until 22 May 1991 Undefeated Southern Area Featherweight Champion, 14 December 1990 until 5 March 1991. Relinquished title on winning the British Title. Record : Bouts 22, won 13 (10), drew 1, lost 8 (6). Not including an exhibition with former World Champion Naseem Hamed at Watford Town Hall. Retired December 1993.

Managed by : 1. Ken Whitney (Weldon, Northamptonshire) 2. Billy Aird (Eltham, London) 3. Terry Toole (Hackney, London) 4. Ken Whitney (Northants) for a second time. 5. Self managed 6. Frank Maloney (London) 7. Self managed (Note, for final fight of his career, he was advised by Brendan Ingle, whose gym he trained out of.)

Trained by : 1. Terry Shufflebottom (Peterborough) 2. Terry Toole (Hackney, London) 3. Kevin Sanders (Peterborough) 4. Jimmy Tibbs & Dean Powell (London) 5. Brendan & John Ingle (Sheffield)

He was born in Manchester, though is most closely associated with Peterborough. The peak of his boxing career was becoming the British featherweight champion in 1991. He knocked out Sean Murphy in the fifth round to win the title on 5 March 1991. He went on to run an amateur boxing club in Peterborough and in 2006 started work as a professional trainer.

== See also ==
- List of British featherweight boxing champions
