= Violence of Summer (Love's Taking Over) =

1990 single by Duran Duran

Single by Duran Duran

from the album Liberty
- B-side: "Throb"
- Released: 23 July 1990
- Studio: Olympic (London)
- Genre: Pop rock; pop-soul
- Length: 4:20 (album version)
- Label: EMI; Capitol
- Songwriters: Simon Le Bon; John Taylor; James Bates; Warren Cuccurullo; Sterling Campbell
- Producers: Duran Duran; Chris Kimsey

Duran Duran singles chronology
"Burning the Ground" (1989)	"Violence of Summer (Love's Taking Over)" (1990)	"Serious" (1990)

Music video
- "Violence of Summer" on YouTube

"Violence of Summer (Love's Taking Over)" is a song by the English pop rock band Duran Duran, released on 23 July 1990 by EMI and Capitol Records as the first single from their sixth studio album, Liberty (1990). The single reached number two in Italy, number eight in Luxembourg and number 20 in the UK. In the US, it peaked at numbers 64 and 56 on the Billboard Hot 100 and Cash Box Top 100.

== Release ==
"Violence of Summer" was released on 23 July 1990 in the United Kingdom as a 7-inch single, a 12-inch single, a CD single, and a cassette single. Two weeks later, on 6 August, another 12-inch single featuring "Throb" as a B-side was issued. In Japan, a mini-CD single was issued on 10 August. On 3 September, "Violence of Summer" was released as a 7-inch and cassette single in Australia, while a 12-inch single was issued on 10 September.

== B-sides and remixes ==
Across various singles seven remixes of "Violence of Summer" were released. Initial copies of the UK 12-inch included a limited edition poster. The B-side, "Throb", is an ambient instrumental remix of Liberty album track "My Antarctica". The use of a remixed album track would be repeated with the inclusion of "Water Babies", a remix of "All Along the Water" on the "Serious" single.

== Track listings ==
UK 7-inch and cassette single

1. "Violence of Summer (Love's Taking Over)" (7-inch mix) – 3:30
2. "Violence of Summer (Love's Taking Over)" (The Story mix) – 3:14

UK 12-inch single

A1. "Violence of Summer (Love's Taking Over)" (The Power mix) – 5:02
AA1. "Violence of Summer (Love's Taking Over)" – 4:19
AA2. "Violence of Summer (Love's Taking Over)" (The Story mix) – 3:14

UK remix 12-inch single

A1. "Violence of Summer (Love's Taking Over)" (The Rock mix) – 4:24
B1. "Violence of Summer (Love's Taking Over)" (The Dub (Sounds of a Powerful mix)) – 4:52
B2. "Throb" – 4:27

UK CD single

1. "Violence of Summer (Love's Taking Over)" (LP version) – 4:20
2. "Throb" – 4:27
3. "Violence of Summer (Love's Taking Over)" (The Power Cut Down) – 4:01
4. "Violence of Summer (Love's Taking Over)" (The Story mix) – 3:14

US and Canadian cassette single

1. "Violence of Summer (Love's Taking Over)"
2. "Yo Bad Azizi"

US 12-inch and CD single

1. "Violence of Summer (Love's Taking Over)" (The Power mix) – 4:56
2. "Violence of Summer (Love's Taking Over)" (dub mix) – 4:47
3. "Violence of Summer (Love's Taking Over)" (rock mix) – 4:23
4. "Violence of Summer (Love's Taking Over)" (The Story mix) – 3:14
5. "Throb" (instrumental) – 4:25

Japanese mini-CD single

1. "Violence of Summer (Love's Taking Over)" (LP version)
2. "Violence of Summer (Love's Taking Over)" (The Power Cut Down)

The Singles 1986–1995 box set

1. "Violence of Summer (Love's Taking Over)" (7-inch mix) – 3:30
2. "Violence of Summer (Love's Taking Over)" (The Story mix) – 3:18
3. "Violence of Summer (Love's Taking Over)" (The Power mix) – 4:56
4. "Violence of Summer (Love's Taking Over)" (album version) – 4:20
5. "Violence of Summer (Love's Taking Over)" (The Rock mix) – 4:23
6. "Violence of Summer (Love's Taking Over)" (The Dub (Sounds of a Powerful mix)) – 4:45
7. "Violence of Summer (Love's Taking Over)" (Power Cut Down) – 4:01
8. "Throb" – 4:25

== Personnel ==
- Simon Le Bon – vocals
- Nick Rhodes – keyboards
- John Taylor – bass guitar
- Warren Cuccurullo – guitar
- Sterling Campbell – drums

== Charts ==
Weekly chart performance for "Violence of Summer (Love's Taking Over)"
Chart (1990)	Peak position
Australia (ARIA)	59
Belgium (Ultratop 50 Flanders)	43
Canada Top Singles (RPM)	82
Europe (Eurochart Hot 100)	34
Germany (GfK)	69
Ireland (IRMA)	21
Israel (IBA)	12
Italy (Musica e dischi)	2
Luxembourg (Radio Luxembourg)	8
Netherlands (Dutch Top 40 Tipparade)	12
Netherlands (Single Top 100)	43
Spain Airplay (Top 40 Radio)	30
Switzerland (Schweizer Hitparade)	29
UK Singles (Official Charts)	20
US Billboard Hot 100	64
US Dance Club Play (Billboard)	36
US Modern Rock Tracks (Billboard)	13
US Cash Box Top 100	56
