= Lizzy Pattinson =

English singer (born 1983)

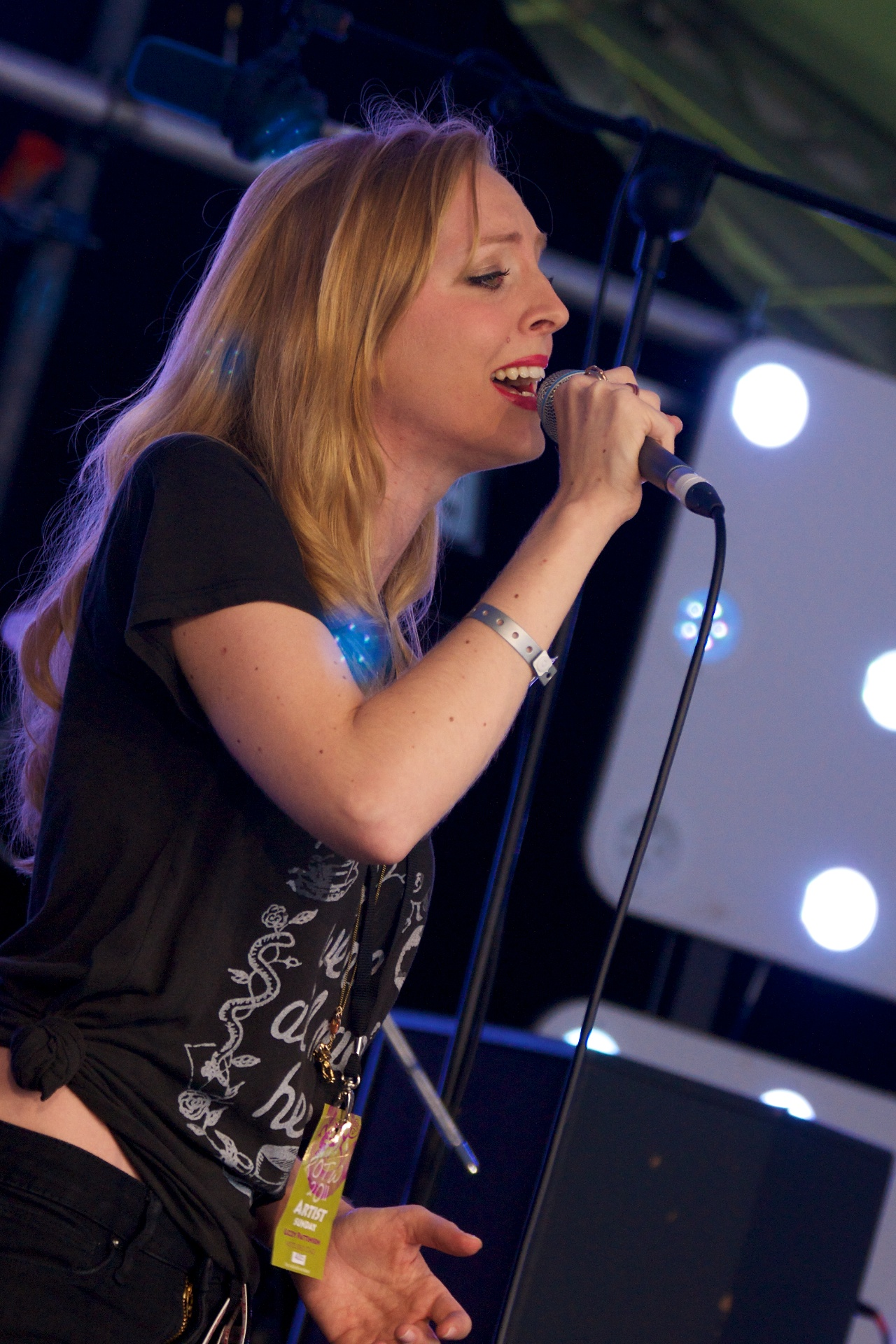
- Pattinson in 2011
- Born: Elizabeth Alice Pattinson; 14 November 1983 (age 43); London, England
- Occupations: Singer; songwriter
- Years active: 2002–present
- Relatives: Robert Pattinson (brother)
- Musical career
- Genres: Alternative rock; pop

Elizabeth Alice Pattinson (born 14 November 1983) is an English singer.

== Early life ==
Pattinson was born on 14 November 1983 in London. She is the second of three children to her parents. Pattinson has an elder sister, Victoria, and younger brother, Robert, who is an actor. She attended Wimbledon High School, London.

== Career ==
Pattinson has performed with the UK dance act Aurora and German duo Milk & Sugar, for which she was lead vocalist on the latter's No. 1 Billboard Hot Dance Club Play track "Let The Sun Shine".

In 2008, Pattinson recorded background vocals for the movie Twilight, in which her brother Robert had starred as vampire Edward Cullen. Her vocals can be heard on the track "Who Are They?" by Carter Burwell. In 2011, Pattinson recorded vocals once again with Burwell for The Twilight Saga: Breaking Dawn – Part 1 at Abbey Road Studios.

In 2014, she participated in the eleventh series of The X Factor. She reached the top 6 in her category (the contestants older than 25 years old, the "Over 25s" group, mentored by Simon Cowell) but was eliminated from the show at the judges' houses.

== See also ==
- List of number-one dance hits (United States)
- List of artists who reached number one on the US Dance chart
