= Serious (Duran Duran song) =

1990 single by Duran Duran

Single by Duran Duran

from the album Liberty
- B-side: "Yo Bad Azizi"; "Water Babies"; "All Along the Water"
- Released: 5 November 1990
- Studio: Olympic (London)
- Genre: Sophisti-pop
- Length: 4:21 (album version); 3:56 (radio edit)
- Label: Parlophone
- Songwriters: Simon Le Bon; John Taylor; James Bates; Warren Cuccurullo; Sterling Campbell
- Producers: Duran Duran; Chris Kimsey

Duran Duran singles chronology
"Violence of Summer (Love's Taking Over)" (1990)	"Serious" (1990)	"Ordinary World" (1992)

Music video
- "Serious" on YouTube

"Serious" is a song by the English pop rock band Duran Duran. It was released on 5 November 1990 as the second single from their sixth studio album, Liberty (1990), reaching number three in Italy and number 48 in the United Kingdom.

== Music video ==
The black and white video, set at a circus, was directed by the duo Big TV! and features model Tess Daly. The video is a favourite among fans for the relaxed, natural attitude among the band members as they play their instruments, sometimes prompting each other into laughter. A multi-angle version of the video is available on the Greatest DVD in 2003, taking advantage of the multiple angle feature available on certain DVD players.

== Track listing ==
UK 7-inch and cassette single

1. "Serious" (7-inch edit) – 3:56
2. "Yo Bad Azizi" – 3:03

UK 12-inch and CD single

1. "Serious"
2. "Yo Bad Azizi"
3. "Water Babies"

US and Canadian cassette single

1. "Serious"
2. "Yo Bad Azizi"
3. "Liberty" (fade—album edit)
4. "First Impression" (fade—album edit)

The Singles 1986–1995 box set

1. "Serious" (single version) – 3:56
2. "Yo Bad Azizi" – 3:03
3. "Water Babies" – 5:35
4. "All Along the Water" – 3:47

== Personnel ==
- Simon Le Bon – vocals
- Nick Rhodes – keyboards
- John Taylor – bass guitar
- Warren Cuccurullo – guitar
- Sterling Campbell – drums

== Charts ==
Weekly chart performance for "Serious"
Chart (1990)	Peak position
Germany (GfK)	69
Italy (Musica e dischi)	3
UK Singles (OCC)	48

== Release history ==
Release dates and formats for "Serious"
Region	Date	Format(s)	Label(s)	Ref.
United Kingdom	5 November 1990	7-inch vinyl; 12-inch vinyl; cassette	Parlophone	
United Kingdom	12 November 1990	12-inch etched vinyl	Parlophone	
Japan	5 December 1990	Mini-CD	EMI	
Australia	25 February 1991	7-inch vinyl; 12-inch vinyl; cassette	Parlophone	
