= Liberty (Duran Duran album) =

1990 studio album by Duran Duran

Studio album by Duran Duran
- Released: 20 August 1990
- Recorded: May 1989 – March 1990
- Studio: Olympic (London)
- Genre: Pop rock; dance-rock; pop-soul
- Length: 50:26
- Label: Parlophone
- Producer: Chris Kimsey; Duran Duran

Duran Duran chronology
Decade (1989)	Liberty (1990)	Duran Duran (1993)

Singles from Liberty
- 1. "Violence of Summer (Love's Taking Over)" Released: 23 July 1990; 2. "Serious" Released: 5 November 1990

Liberty is the sixth studio album by the English pop rock band Duran Duran, released on 20 August 1990 by Parlophone. The album reached number eight on the UK Albums Chart, and spawned the singles "Violence of Summer (Love's Taking Over)" and "Serious". The album has received negative reviews from critics, citing poor songwriting and a lack of musical direction.

== Background ==
Duran Duran had emerged as one of the most successful bands of the 1980s, helping to both spearhead the so-called 'Second British Invasion' of the American charts and making increasingly striking music videos to promote their singles via MTV. By the mid 1980s, however, the band had lost both Roger and Andy Taylor, who had quit shortly after their 1985 Live Aid performance. Subsequent studio albums Notorious and Big Thing produced Top 10 singles and were critically well-received, but sold fewer quantities than their predecessors. Whilst the 1989 Decade compilation managed to chart in the Top 10 around the world, it was seen as a temporary stop-gap and an opportunity for the band to decide what musical direction they wanted to explore in the 1990s.

== Writing and recording ==
Vocalist Simon Le Bon commented, "We went into a barn in Sussex and started jamming away, and before we got finished, it was like, 'Right we've got the album, let's go and record it now.' And I don't think we got it right; I don't think we were paying enough attention. We were quite self-conscious at the time as well, the way things had been going, and it kind of made us stand outside of ourselves to do the album. But out of that came two of the best songs Duran's ever come up with, 'Serious' and 'My Antarctica', they're really, really beautiful songs. I don't think it's a bad album, but there's definitely weak spots on it, definitely. I mean, something like 'Violence of Summer', it just didn't have a proper chorus, great verse though. Just not paying enough attention, we just lost our concentration." Ultimately though, he proved to be quite sanguine about the album as a whole, stating on its 25th anniversary in 2015: "I wouldn't go back and change anything though, I'd rather spend two weeks writing a new song than making changes to Liberty. It was a point in time for Duran Duran. I really do look back on Liberty with a lot of fondness."

According to John Taylor, the recording sessions dragged as the band members were unsure of the album's direction. Le Bon also suffered from writer's block and devoted more time to his wife and newborn daughter than recording. Liberty was the first Duran Duran album to credit guitarist Warren Cuccurullo as an official member. It is also drummer Sterling Campbell's sole credit as an official member of the band, as he left following the album's release.

A bootleg recording of the demo sessions for the album, titled Didn't Anybody Tell You? surfaced in 1999. Many unreleased, scrapped songs from the Liberty sessions were heard by the public for the first time:

- "Bottleneck"
- "Money on Your Side"
- "Dream Nation"
- "In Between Woman"
- "Worth Waiting For"
- "My Family" (played live 1989)

When asked about the bootleg, John Taylor said, "I like coming across things that I've forgotten about. That I've forgotten that we recorded. That's what's really exciting about the Didn't Anybody Tell You bootleg, because there's so many songs on there that never got finished. They just take me back to that moment. Actually, what I like about that album is that the Liberty album—when we were rehearsing it, when we were writing it was gonna be a great album. I really felt it was gonna be a great album. When we got in the studio I fell apart and the production just wasn't right. It turned out to be a very mediocre album, but at the demo stage, which is what that [bootleg] album is all about, I think there's a great album in there. Could have been great songs."

In an interview discussing the album's 25th anniversary, Le Bon looked back on Liberty fondly, giving high praise to songs such as "Serious", "My Antarctica" and "Venice Drowning", ultimately saying, "I think the issue with Liberty is that we were in a transition and there were some tracks that didn't have our whole heart in it."

== Release ==
The lead single, "Violence of Summer (Love's Taking Over)", was released on 23 June 1990, debuting at number 23 in the UK but failing to reach the top 60 in the US. The band themselves did not have faith in the single. In a 2020 interview with Paul Sinclar, the editor of website Super Deluxe Edition, Kimsey noted that either the songs "Serious" or "Liberty" should have been lead singles and the whole album may have seen more commercial success.

Released on 20 August 1990, Liberty reached number eight in the UK before falling off the chart quickly. It fared similarly in the US, reaching number 46 before dropping off. "Serious" was released as the second single on 5 November 1990, failing to break the UK top 40. The band did not tour for Liberty, instead making brief promotional trips to Australia, New Zealand and Florence. Four months after the album's release, Capitol Records scrapped plans for music videos for proposed singles "First Impression" and "Liberty".

== Reception ==
Professional ratings
Review scores
Source	Rating
AllMusic	1.5/5 stars
The Encyclopedia of Popular Music	1/5 stars
Entertainment Weekly	C−
Rolling Stone	3/5 stars
The Rolling Stone Album Guide	2/5 stars
Select	1/5 medals
Spin Alternative Record Guide	2/10

Critical reception to Liberty was mainly negative with a number of music journalists slating the album; Trouser Press magazine described it as "a senseless collision of tuneless guitar raunch, Motown-inflected soul-pop and numbing dance grooves" whilst Q Magazine's reviewer Andrew Martin suggested that only three tracks—"Liberty", "Serious" and "My Antarctica"—were worthy of inclusion, a view echoed in 2020 by producer Chris Kimsey, who said: "if you took all the crap off this album and had an EP, it would have been huge[...] the other stuff was, like, panic, pressure."

A positive review appeared in Spin in November 1990. Reviewer Mark Blackwell wrote "Liberty shows the band in its most appealing form in years (...) Duran Duran once again successfully straddle the line between dance and rock". Blackwell noted that "the new songs are characteristically slick, yet stripped-down. Effects and samples are minimal. The guitar is prominently back and the music is diverse", while admitting that "a couple of the songs, like 'Hothead', are stupid and meaningless."

Later reviews have been mostly negative, with the author Steve Malins calling Liberty Duran Duran's worst album. AllMusic's Stephen Thomas Erlewine said the album lacked direction and featured no material that lives up to the band's best work, arguing that it failed to meet the finest moments on Big Thing. Classic Pop called the album "overproduced and underwritten" and a record that even hardcore Duran Duran fans fail to defend.

== Track listing ==
All tracks are written by Duran Duran, except where noted. As with the previous release of Big Thing, Toshiba-EMI would release Liberty in a two-disc set, with a 3-inch CD (CD3) consisting of two b-side songs and a remix of Violence of Summer.

No.	Title	Length
1.	"Violence of Summer (Love's Taking Over)"	4:22
2.	"Liberty"	5:01
3.	"Hothead"	3:31
4.	"Serious"	4:21
5.	"All Along the Water"	3:50
6.	"My Antarctica"	5:01
7.	"First Impression"	5:28
8.	"Read My Lips"	4:30
9.	"Can You Deal with It"	3:47
10.	"Venice Drowning"	5:13
11.	"Downtown"	5:23

Bonus disc (Japan only)
No.	Title	Length
1.	"Yo Bad Azizi"	3:03
2.	"Throb"	4:25
3.	"Violence of Summer (Love's Taking Over)" (The Story mix)	3:18

== Personnel ==
Duran Duran

- Simon Le Bon – lead vocals
- Nick Rhodes – keyboards
- John Taylor – bass guitar
- Warren Cuccurullo – guitars
- Sterling Campbell – drums

Additional musicians

- John Jones – programming and additional keyboards
- Tessa Niles – background vocals
- Carol Kenyon – background vocals
- Bernard Fowler – background vocals
- Stan Harrison – saxophone
- Roddy Lorimer – trumpet
- Luís Jardim – percussion
- Spike Edney – additional keyboards, engineer

== Charts ==
Chart performance for Liberty
Chart (1990)	Peak position
Australian Albums (ARIA)	86
Dutch Albums (Album Top 100)	37
European Albums (Music & Media)	37
Italian Albums (Musica e dischi)	6
Swiss Albums (Schweizer Hitparade)	36
UK Albums (OCC)	8
US Billboard 200	46

== Certifications ==
Certifications for Liberty
Region	Certification	Certified units/sales
United Kingdom (BPI)	Silver	60,000^{^}
^{^} Shipments figures based on certification alone.
