= Aurora (electronic music group) =

British electronic dance music group

- Also known as: Aurora UK
- Origin: Weybridge, Surrey, England
- Genres: Electronic; house; trance
- Years active: 1999–present
- Members: Sacha Collisson; Simon Greenaway

Aurora, also known as Aurora UK, are a British electronic dance music group, consisting of keyboardist/guitarist Sacha Collisson (born 14 November 1970) and fellow keyboardist Simon Greenaway (born 4 July 1969). Five of their singles charted on the UK Singles Chart; their biggest hit is their cover of Duran Duran's "Ordinary World" at No. 5.

Their first and only self-titled album was released in 2002 by EMI Records.

== Discography ==
=== Albums ===
- Aurora (2002) (US release renamed Dreaming, credited to "Aurora UK", and contains two additional tracks, "Dreaming (LTI radio edit)" and "Ordinary World (radio mix)")

=== Singles ===
- "Hear You Calling" (1999) - UK No. 71
- "Hear You Calling" (re-issue) (2000) - UK No. 17
- "Ordinary World" (2000) - UK No. 5 (originally by Duran Duran)
- "Dreaming" (2002) - UK No. 24
- "The Day It Rained Forever" (2002) - UK No. 29
- "If You Could Read My Mind" (2002) (originally by Gordon Lightfoot)
- "Sleeping Satellite" (2003) – AUS No. 60 (originally by Tasmin Archer)
- "Real Life" (2005)
- "Summer Son" (2006) - UK No. 82 (originally by Texas)
- "Love Resurrection" (2009) (originally by Alison Moyet)
