= Malpass =

Malpass is a surname. Notable people with the surname include:

- Billy Malpass (1867–1939), English association football player
- David Malpass (born 1956), American economist and politician
- Eric Malpass (1910–1996), English novelist
- Johnny Malpass, English rugby league player
- Malcolm Malpass (born 1947), British Olympic rower
- Michael Malpass (1946–1991), American sculptor and artist
- Monica Malpass (born 1961), American journalist and television anchor
- Sam Malpass (1918–1983), English association football player
- Steve Malpass, English language voice actor of Fox McCloud, a fictional character and the protagonist of the Star Fox video game series

== See also ==
- MILPAS
- Malbas
- Malpais (disambiguation)
- Malpas (disambiguation)
- Malpaso (disambiguation)
- Malpasse
- Malpaís (disambiguation)
