= Isabel Ely Lord =

American librarian, author and researcher

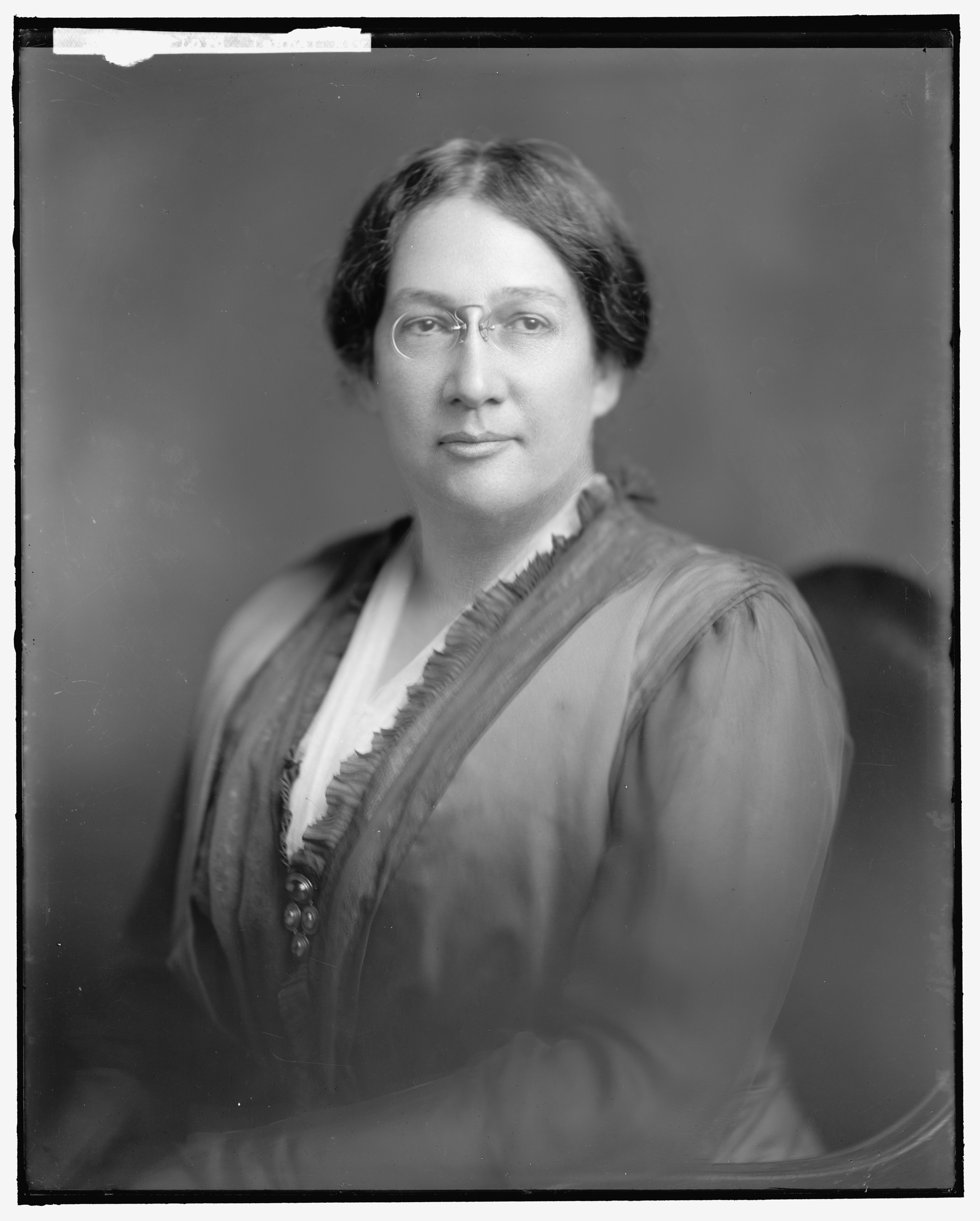
- Born: 1871
- Died: 1959, Age 88; Brooklyn, NY
- Occupations: Librarian, Home Economist, Author

Isabel Ely Lord (1871 – 1959) was an American librarian, author and researcher. She graduated from the New York State Library School with a bachelor's degree in library science in 1897. From 1897 to 1903 Lord worked at Bryn Mawr College. Lord was active in the New York State Library Association, serving as secretary/treasurer in 1898, 1899, 1900, 1901, and 1902. She served as the librarian for Pratt Institute from 1904 until 1910, and was the director of the School of Household Sciences and Arts at Pratt from 1910 to 1920. Lord wrote and edited several books on home economics, including Everybody's Cook Book and Getting Your Money's Worth, and conducted research for Carl Sandburg's biography of Abraham Lincoln.

== Research ==
Lord gave lectures and wrote about the role of libraries in public life and their impact on education. In 1900 she spoke about the influence of open library stacks on public morals. She also wrote a chapter for the American Library Association's Manual of Library Economy (1914) on the topic of the free public library at Pratt.

== Selected works ==
- The free public library (American Library Association Publishing Board, 1914)
- Everybody's cook book, a comprehensive manual of home cookery (H. Holt, 1924)
- The household cookbook (Harcourt, Brace and Company, 1936)
- The modern woman's cook book (Sun dial Press, 1939)
