= Phyllis Baker Hammond =

American sculptor (1930–2024)

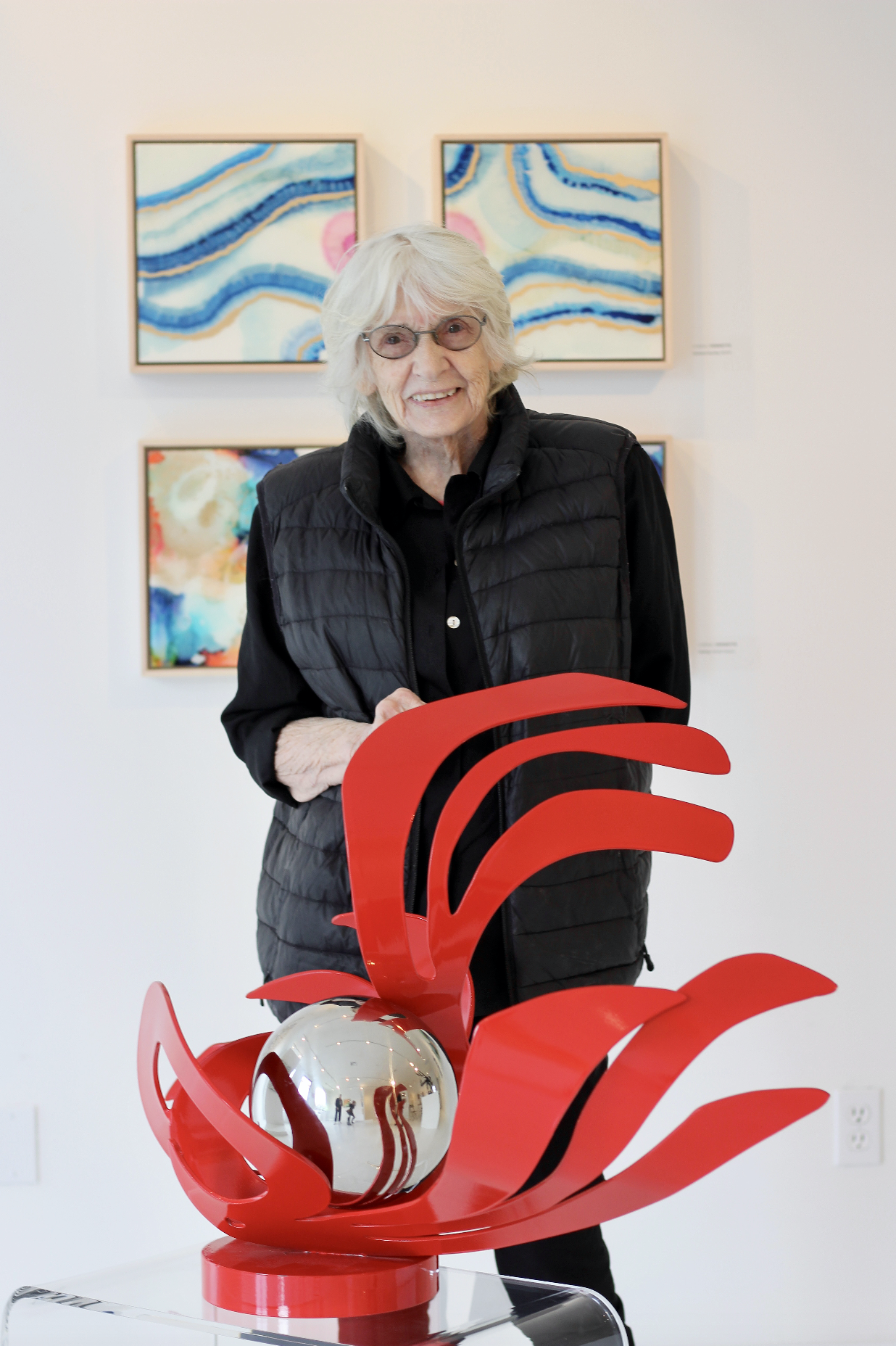
Hammond with her sculpture Swirl at J. Mackey Gallery in East Hampton

Phyllis Baker Hammond (born Mary Phyllis Baker; April 13, 1930 – October 23, 2024) was an American sculptor, artist, designer, and educator.

== Early life and education ==
Phyllis Baker Hammond was born in Elizabeth, New Jersey on April 13, 1930 to John Willis Baker and Margaret McElarney and grew up in Melrose, Massachusetts. At the age of eight, she travelled alone to the Museum of Fine Arts, Boston to sketch Greek and Roman sculptures.

Hammond attended the School of the Museum of Fine Arts at Tufts University, where she earned her BA and an MFA degree. Later, she earned a BS in Education from Tufts University. In 1960, she received a traveling scholarship from the trustees of the Museum of Fine Arts.

Hammond became the first American woman to study at Kyoto City College of Fine Arts in Japan, supported by the Clarissa Bartlett Traveling Scholarship. From 1960 to 1962, she attended the Haystack Mountain School.

== Artistic career and mediums ==
Hammond's early work focused on ceramics and clay sculpture.

In her later years, she transitioned to creating sculptures with aluminium and developed a process that began with spontaneous doodles, which were then digitized, cut by water jet machines, and refined through hammering and powder coating.

== Public art commissions ==
Hammond designed the William Shakespeare Award for Classical Theatre ("The Will Award"), a 14-inch cast bronze piece honoring Shakespeare and his work.

Her other commissions included works for the Connecticut Commission for the Arts, American Savings Bank's corporate headquarters in White Plains, New York, Guest Quarters Hotel in Bethesda, Maryland and Connecticut State University. Her sculpture Maze I (2011) was commissioned for the Pratt Institute Sculpture Park. In 2017, her installation Beyond the Edge, a series of five large-scale works, was displayed in Dag Hammarskjold Plaza near the United Nations in New York City.

== Personal life ==
Hammond divorced at age 24, and in 1985, married Aldo Perotto, a professor at the Albert Einstein College of Medicine. She had two daughters.

== Exhibition history and recognition ==
Hammond's work has been shown in over 30 group exhibitions and numerous solo shows. Her solo exhibitions included shows at the Pindar Gallery and 112 Greene Street Gallery in SoHo, Howard Wise Gallery on West 57th Street, Hudson River Gallery, Osilas Gallery in Bronxville, Westlake Gallery in White Plains, and the Noyes Museum, which featured a retrospective of her work. Her international exhibitions included shows in Japan and Switzerland. In 2023, a retrospective of her work titled "Take Flight" was held at J. Mackey Gallery in East Hampton.

== Awards and achievements ==
Hammond received a National Endowment for the Arts Grant in 1981, a Ragdale Artists Community Fellowship in 1990, and the Women in Design International Compendium Certificate of Outstanding Achievement in 1986. She was a finalist for the Sculpture Garden at the University of West Florida in 1991 and received multiple sculpture and art awards from various institutions. In 2009, she was awarded the Museum of Greenery, Flowers, and Sculpture Prize at the Ube Tokiwa Museum's International Biennale sculpture competition in Japan for her 10-foot piece Redefining Space.

== Later life and legacy ==
In 1998, Hammond relocated from Scarborough, New York, to East Hampton, New York, where she worked in a custom-built studio and sculpture garden designed by Charles Forberg, architect of LongHouse Reserve. She was also an early advocate for art therapy and taught young women at Bellevue Hospital how to create forms in clay.

== Death ==
Hammond died on October 23, 2024, in Los Angeles, California. Private services were held at the Getty Center in Los Angeles and on Cape Cod, and she was buried at Oak Grove Cemetery in Falmouth, Massachusetts.
