= Frances Bronet =

Canadian architect and academic administrator

12th President of the Pratt Institute
- Incumbent
- Assumed office January 2, 2018
- Preceded by: Thomas F. Schutte

Personal details
- Education: McGill University (BS, BArch, BEng); Columbia University (MS)
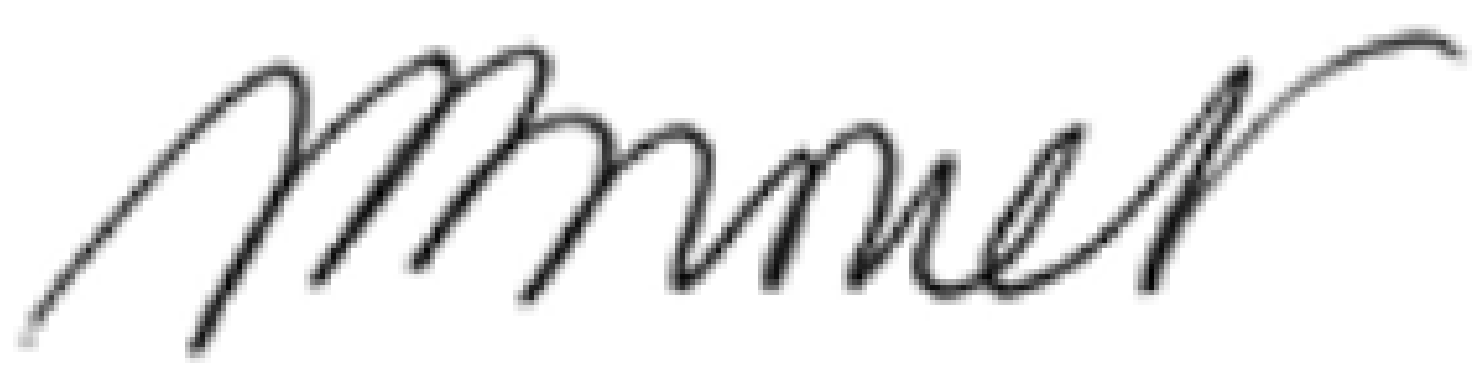
- Signature

Frances Bronet is a Canadian architect and academic administrator who has been serving as the 12th president of Pratt Institute in New York City since January 2018. She previously served as provost of the private Illinois Institute of Technology in Chicago from 2015 to 2018 and as acting provost of the University of Oregon from 2014 to 2015.

== Education ==
Graduated from McGill University in Canada, Bronet received a Bachelor of Science in Architecture (1977), a professional Bachelor of Architecture (1978), and a Bachelor of Engineering in civil engineering. Bronet received a Master of Science in Architecture from Columbia University. She is a member of the Order of Architects of Quebec.

== Career ==
Bronet began her academic career as a faculty member at the Rensselaer Polytechnic Institute in Troy, New York, in 1985. She served as dean of the University of Oregon College of Design from 2005 to 2014 and acting provost of the University of Oregon from 2014 to 2015. Bronet served as senior vice president and provost at the private Illinois Institute of Technology in Chicago from 2015 to 2018. On January 2, 2018, Bronet was named the 12th president of Pratt Institute.
