= Pratt Institute Libraries =

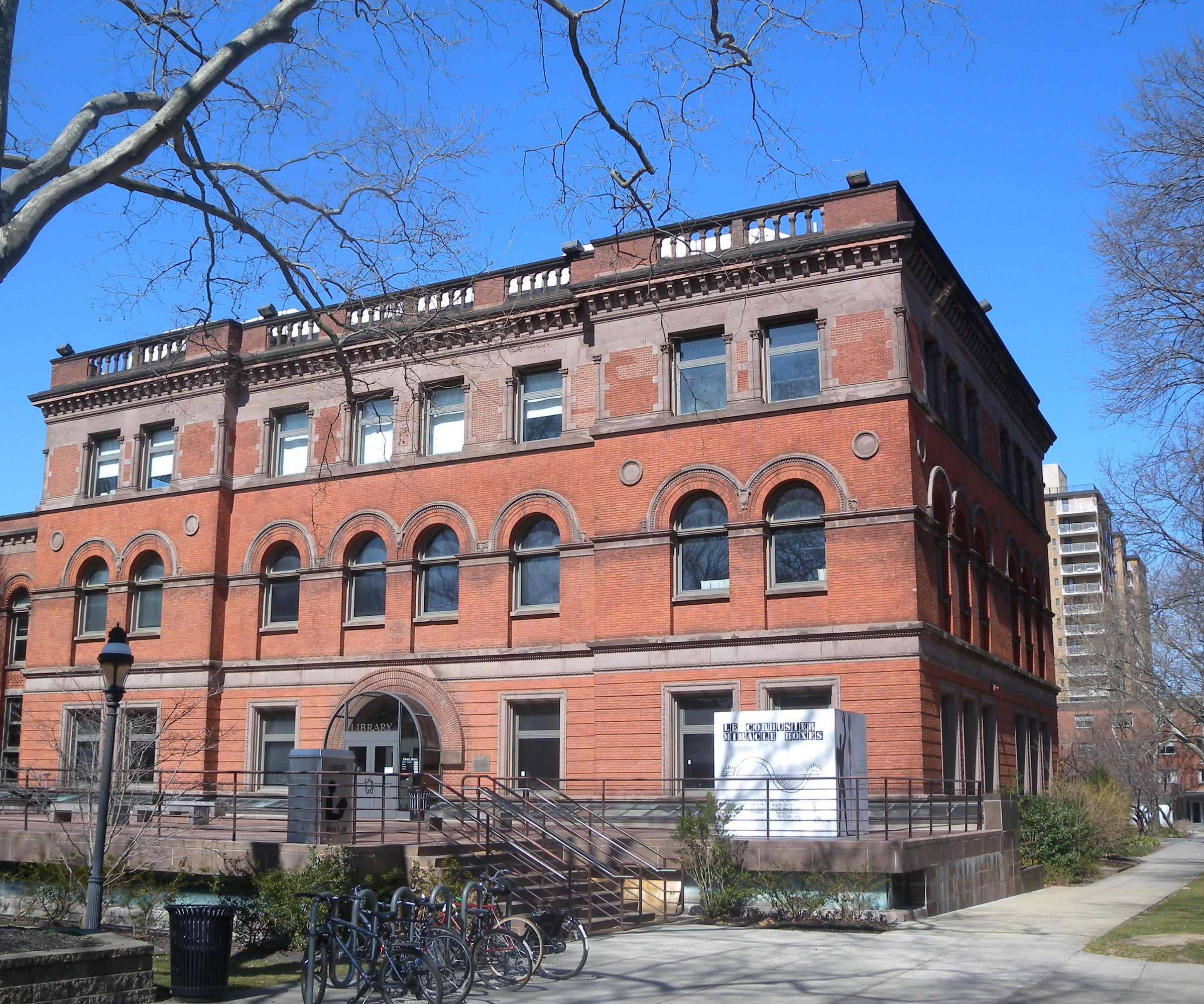
- Main Library at Pratt Institute in Brooklyn, NY
- 40.69086°N 73.96502°W
- Location: 224-228 Ryerson Street, Brooklyn, NY, United States
- Type: Academic library
- Scope: Art, architecture, design, library science
- Established: 1888
- Architect: William Tubby
- Branches: 1

Other information
- Website: library.pratt.edu

Pratt Institute Libraries is the academic library system of Pratt Institute. The main Pratt Library is located on the main campus in the Clinton Hill neighborhood of Brooklyn, NY. A branch library is located at the Pratt Manhattan Center in Greenwich Village. The Library collections focuses on the arts, architecture, design, library and information science, and allied fields. Holdings include 200,000 printed volumes, over 600 periodicals, rare books, digital images resources including Pratt Institute specific Digital Image Collection, and the Institute's Archives. It was the “first free public library in Brooklyn” and its Brooklyn building is a New York City designated landmark.

== History ==
Copper shelf decoration and glass floors, designed by Tiffany and Glass Decorating Company in 1896, Pratt Library Brooklyn

The Library at Pratt Institute, originally called the Pratt Institute Free Library, was founded in 1888 on Pratt's Brooklyn campus. The opening day of the Library was January 4, 1888. At the time, the reading room contained 150 periodicals and a collection of reference materials. Patrons were able to check out one book at a time. The Pratt Institue Free Library was initially open to anyone who lived or worked in Brooklyn over fourteen. In 1891, the age limit was removed. Branch libraries of the Pratt Institute Free Library included the Astral Branch—located on the ground floor of the Astral Apartments (another Charles Pratt initiative), and the Long Island Branch at 571 Atlantic Ave.

The Library moved into its present building located on Ryerson Street on the main campus in May 1896, with a reported building cost of $190,000 An opening ceremony was held on May 26th, 1896 and included addresses by Charles Pratt, Margaret Deland, Truman J. Backus, and Melvil Dewey, then State Librarian of New York, and music by the Daunreuther Quartet.

By 1940 the Pratt Libraries closed to the public, partly because the Brooklyn Public Library was able to support the needs of the community.

From 1996-2001, the Pratt Manhattan Center was located at the Puck Building. In 2001, the Pratt Manhattan Center Library moved to its present location at 144 West 14th Street in Greenwich Village.

Historic photographs of the Pratt Institute Library, Brooklyn
Pratt Institute Library interior n.d., circa 1887-1895

Reading room in the Pratt Institute Library, 1890

Interior view of the Pratt Institute Library circulation department, 1903

Pratt Institute Free Library exterior, 1913

Pratt Institute Library, Library Park, 1919, Brooklyn, NY

Children's Portico (porch), Pratt Institute Library, n.d., c. 1914

== Architecture ==
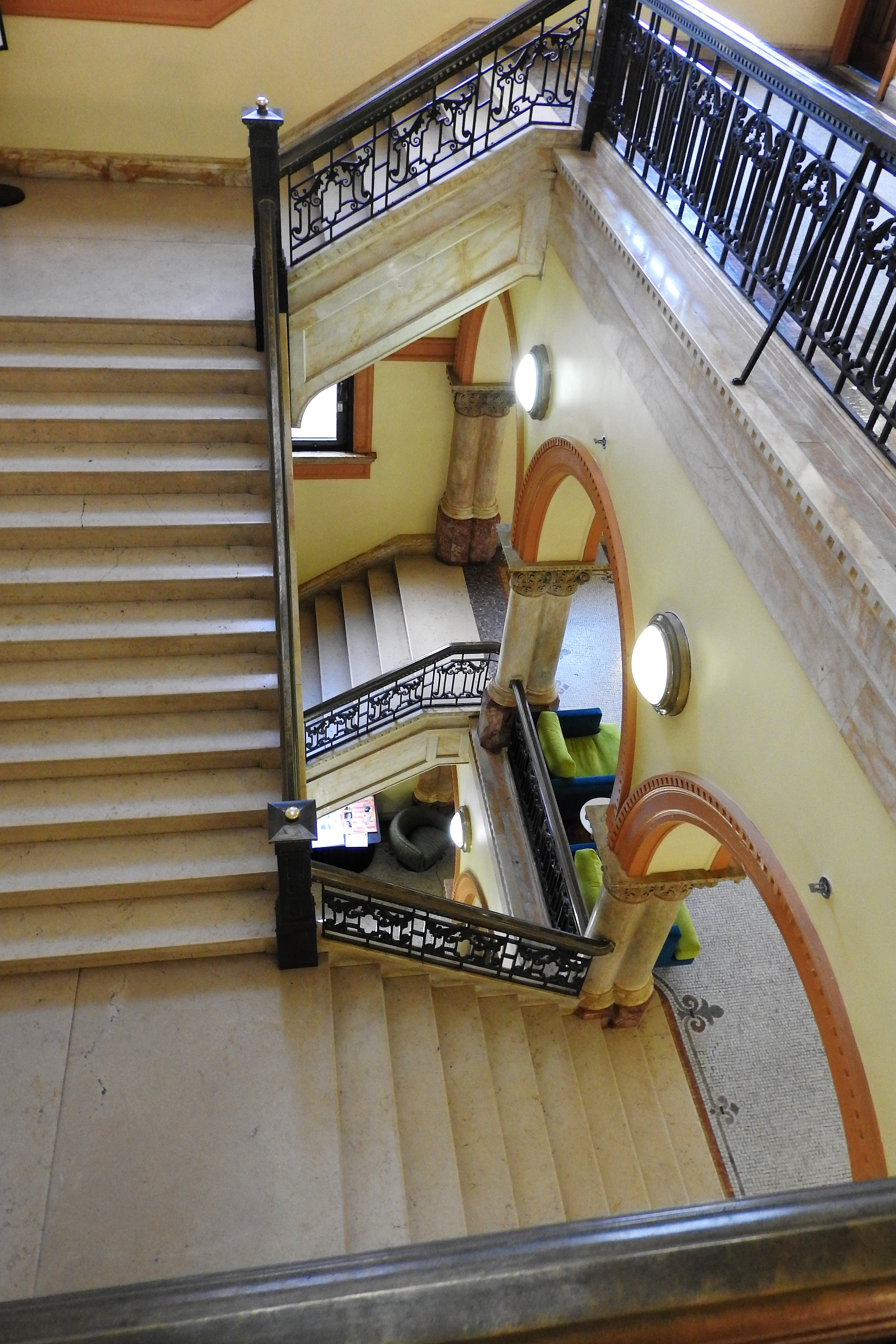
Stairwell of the Pratt Institute Brooklyn Library

The three-story rose brick and Belleville brownstone Pratt Library building in Brooklyn, opened in 1896, was designed by William B. Tubby in a Renaissance Revival style. The landscaped grounds in front of the Library was designated Library Park. Tiffany and Glass Decorating Company designed interiors, including glass floors designed to bring in natural light to the building. The building includes a signature marble staircase and pillars, iron railings, and balusters. The stacks are a design by Library Bureau, which include oak shelves and copper-plated iron shelf supports, designed to house 200,000 volumes.

The original library contained a children's room, with early renovations in 1912 including the addition of a Children's portico to provide direct access to the Children's Room, "fashioned after the Norman staircase of Canterbury Cathedral."

The north porch, by architect John Mead Howells, was added in the 1936. The north porch is now sealed off.

Renovations in the early 1980s by architects Giorgio Cavaglieri and Warren Gran included a new wing—an underground extension including additional stacks, study areas, and classroom with an outdoor mall above, the removal of the Children's portico, and the addition of a climate-control system.

In 1981 the Main Library building in Brooklyn was officially designated a New York City Landmark by the New York City Landmarks Preservation Commission.

From 1999 and 2002, renovations were done by Rogers Marvel Architects, with a budget of $2.4 million.

== Notable librarians ==
- Mary Wright Plummer - Founder of the Pratt Library School, director of the Pratt Libraries beginning in 1895, and director of ALA for the 1915-16 year.
- Isabel Ely Lord - Author, editor and Head Librarian for Pratt Institute from 1904 until 1910, and director of the School of Household Sciences and Arts at Pratt.
- Anne Carroll Moore - Librarian at Pratt Library from 1896-1906, and early advocate for children's libraries.
- Josephine Adams Rathbone - President of the American Library Association in 1931–32, "chief instructor" in the Pratt Institute Library School from 1895-1911, and vice-director of the Pratt Institute school from 1911-1938.
- Edward Francis Stevens - Head of Applied Sciences Reference Department at Pratt Institute Free Library from 1903-1910, and Librarian at Pratt Library and Director of Pratt School of Library Science from 1911-1938.
- Wayne Shirley - Director of Pratt Library, Dean of the Pratt Library School and co-founder of the ALA American Library History Round Table.
- Rice Estes - Director of Pratt Institute Libraries from 1955-1972, and husband of librarian and Newbery Award winning children's author Eleanor Estes.

== Pop culture ==
- Some scenes from the 1978 adult film Debbie Does Dallas were filmed in the library without the Library's knowledge of the nature of the film.
