= Caroline Ladd Pratt House =

Historic home in Brooklyn, New York

Coordinates: 40°41′28.4″N 73°58′04.2″W

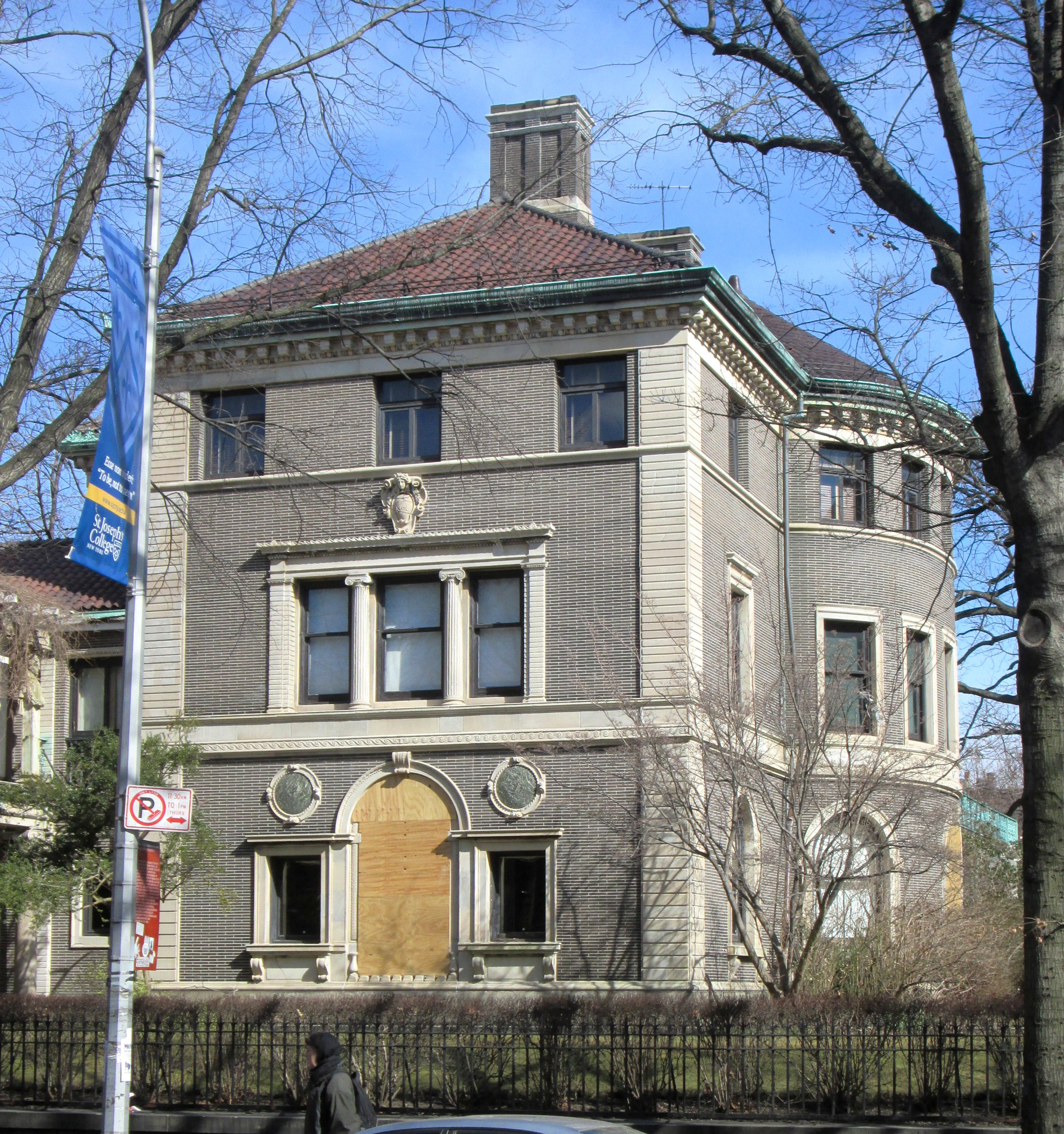
Caroline Ladd Pratt House

The Caroline Ladd Pratt House is a mansion at 229 Clinton Avenue, Brooklyn, New York, United States. It was formerly known as the Frederic B. Pratt House, as it was built for Pratt as the family home with his wife Caroline Ladd Pratt. Completed in 1898, it was designed by architects Babb, Cook and Willard in a neo-Georgian style.

Caroline Ladd Pratt survived her husband. She bequeathed the mansion to the Pratt Institute, which the family had long supported. It was later used as the residence of the college president.

In 2017, Matiz Architecture and Design completed a restoration project that addressed many facade and window elements, bringing the historic residence back to its more elegant appearance. The exterior trellis was also restored.
