= Malpas =

Malpas may refer to:

== Places ==
=== France ===
- Malpas, Doubs, a commune in the Doubs department
- Malpas Tunnel, a tunnel on the Canal du Midi

=== United Kingdom ===
- Malpas, Berkshire, a location in south-east England
- Malpas, Cheshire, north-west England
- Malpas, Cornwall, south-west England
- Malpas, Newport, south-east Wales

== Other uses ==
- Malpas (surname), people with the name
- Malpas (band), an English folktronica duo
- MALPAS Software Static Analysis Toolset for safety critical applications
