= Stephen Hilger =

American photographer (born 1975)

- Born: Los Angeles, California
- Education: Columbia University
- Occupation: Photographer

Stephen Hilger (born in Los Angeles, California in 1975) is an American photographer, writer, and educator who lives in Brooklyn, New York.

== Career ==
Hilger received his BA and MFA degrees from Columbia University in 1998 and 2003. He participated in the Whitney Museum of American Art’s Independent Study Program in 2003-2004.

Hilger’s photographs trace historical narratives visible in American cities. Beginning in 2001, his photographs focused on visual motifs at the intersection of public and private spaces throughout LA. From 2004 to its razing in 2006, Hilger documented the Ambassador Hotel, the site of the assassination of Robert F. Kennedy in 1968. During 2008-2012, Hilger lived in New Orleans, LA during which time he photographed the Back of Town, a historic district devastated during Hurricane Katrina, partially rebuilt then marked for demolition. Hilger’s book of photographs, entitled Back of Town, depicts the neighborhood during its last days. Hilger has said of his working approach, “I don’t think of documentary photography as being about truth, but rather viewing and experiencing the world.”

Hilger teaches at Pratt Institute in Brooklyn, NY where he is an Associate Professor and previously was Photography Chair. Previously, Hilger taught at Tulane University in New Orleans, LA; and at Columbia University, New York University Steinhardt School, and Pace University, all in New York, NY. Hilger writes about photography, photography books, and contemporary art for periodicals including Aperture and BOMB. He has written critical essays for books about artists including Sue de Beer and Lee Friedlander.

== Collections ==
Hilger’s photographs are included in the permanent collections of the Los Angeles County Museum of Art and New Orleans Museum of Art.

== Publications ==
=== Photography books ===
- Hilger, Stephen; Back of Town. Brooklyn, NY: SPQR Editions, 2016. ISBN 978-0997530629
- Hilger, Stephen; BLVD. Brooklyn, NY: Roman Nvmerals, 2017.

=== Other publications ===
- Sue de Beer, Hans und Grete, Essays by Alissa Bennett, Dennis Cooper, Stephen Hilger. Künstlerhaus Bethanien, Berlin, Philip Morris GmbH, Munich, American Academy in Berlin, 2002. ISBN 978-3932754326
- Lee Friedlander: The Printed Picture. Edited with essays by Stephen Hilger and Peter Kayafas. Eakins Press Foundation and Pratt Institute Photography Department and Libraries, 2014. OCLC 898196377
