= Richardson Pratt Jr =

Richardson Pratt Jr.

10th President of Pratt Institute
- In office 1972–1990

Personal details
- Born: March 25, 1923
- Died: May 1, 2001 (aged 78) Cold Spring Harbor, New York, U.S.
- Spouse: Mary Esterbrook Offutt
- Children: 3
- Education: Williams College; Harvard Business School
- Occupation: Businessman and educational administrator

Richardson Pratt Jr. (March 25, 1923 – May 1, 2001) was an American businessman and educational administrator. He was the president of the Pratt Institute in Brooklyn from 1972 to 1990, and chairman of Charles Pratt & Company.

== Early life ==
Richardson Pratt Jr. was born on March 25, 1923, and grew up in Brooklyn and Glen Cove, New York. He was the son of Richardson Pratt (1894–1959) and his wife, Laura Cecilia Parsons, and the grandson of Charles Millard Pratt. He was a great-grandson of the founder of the Pratt Institute, Charles Pratt.

He was educated at the Choate School and earned a bachelor's degree from Williams College in 1946, and a master's degree from the Harvard Business School in 1948.

== Career ==
He was president of the Pratt Institute in Brooklyn from 1972 to 1990, and chairman of Charles Pratt & Company.

== Personal life ==
In 1944, Pratt married Mary Esterbrook Offutt, the daughter of Mr and Mrs Caspar Yost Offutt, a former diplomat, in Omaha, Nebraska. Her uncle was the aviator Jarvis Offutt. She was educated at Shipley School and Vassar College.

They had three children, Laura P. Gregg of Bryn Mawr, Pennsylvania, Thomas R. Pratt of Coconut Grove, Florida, and David O. Pratt of Chestnut Hill, Pennsylvania.

Pratt died from pancreatic cancer on May 1, 2001, at his home in Cold Spring Harbor, New York, aged 78.
