= Carole Rosenthal =

Carole Rosenthal (born 13 December 1940) is a fiction writer, the author of It Doesn't Have To Be Me, a collection of short stories.

She was a professor of English and Humanities at Pratt Institute in Brooklyn, and was honoured in 2015 as a professor emeritus.

== Written works ==
Carole Rosenthal's fiction has been published in many commercial and literary magazines. Her first story, The Star, was published in the Transatlantic Review. Her work has been published in magazines that range from the experimental, such as The Cream City Review and the Minnesota review, to the mainstream, including Other Voices, Confrontation, Another Chicago Magazine, Ellery Queen's Mystery Magazine and Alfred Hitchcock Magazine, to the political, with Mother Jones and Ms.. Frequently anthologized (Not Somewhere Else but Here, Powers of Desire, Masterpieces of Mystery, Love Stories by New Women), her writing has also been dramatized for radio, television, and stage.

Rosenthal is working on a memoir with the tentative title of Close Finishes.
