= Malpaís =

Malpaís or Malpais may refer to:

- Malpaís (landform)
- The Malpais Legate, a.k.a. Joshua Graham, character in Fallout: New Vegas, a video game

== Place names, real and fictional ==
- Malpaís in Brave New World
- Casa Malpaís
- Malpais, Costa Rica
- Malpais-Sint Michiel, a wildlife area in Curaçao
- A beach on the Pacific coast of Costa Rica, which is also the namesake of a short story by S. K. Azoulay

== Other ==
- Malpaís (group)
- 6370 Malpais, a main-belt asteroid
