= Thomas F. Schutte =

American academic administrator (1935–2025)

Thomas Frederick Schutte

11th President of Pratt Institute
- In office 1993–2017
- Preceded by: Warren F. Ilchman
- Succeeded by: Frances Bronet

14th President of Rhode Island School of Design
- In office August 1983 – 1992
- Preceded by: Lee Hall
- Succeeded by: Louis A. Fazzano

President of Philadelphia College of Art
- In office 1975–1982

Personal details
- Born: December 19, 1935 Rochester, New York, U.S.
- Died: March 26, 2025 (aged 89) Buffalo, New York, U.S.
- Spouse: Tess Lansing
- Children: 2
- Education: Valparaiso University (BA); Indiana University Bloomington (MBA); University of Colorado (PhD)
- Occupation: Academic administrator, teacher, college president

Thomas Frederick Schutte (December 19, 1935 – March 26, 2025) was an American academic administrator and educator. He served as the 11th president of Pratt Institute in New York City from 1993 to 2017, the 14th president of the Rhode Island School of Design from 1983 to 1992, and the president of the Philadelphia College of Art from 1974 to 1982.

== Early life and education ==
Thomas Frederick Schutte was born on December 19, 1935, in Rochester, New York, to parents Marion Healy and Lindsley R. Schutte.

Schutte received a Bachelor of Arts in 1957 from Valparaiso University in Indiana, a Master of Business Administration in 1958 from Indiana University School of Business (Bloomington), and a Doctor of Philosophy in 1963 in marketing and management from the University of Colorado.

== Career ==
Schutte's first role was as a professor and assistant dean at the Wharton School of the University of Pennsylvania in Philadelphia. He edited the book The Art of Design Management, Design in American Business (1975, University of Pennsylvania Press), which was created based on the six Tiffany–Wharton Lectures series on design management in 1973.

He was president of the Philadelphia College of Art (now University of the Arts) in Philadelphia from 1975 to 1982.

Schutte served as 14th president of the Rhode Island School of Design (RISD) in Providence from 1983 to 1992. During his time at RISD, he led the opening of the Design Center in Hope Block and Cheapside (1986) and acquired 20 Washington Place (1988).

His final and longest role as 11th president was at the Pratt Institute in Brooklyn, from 1993 to 2017. At Pratt, Schutte worked to eliminate the deficit, revitalized the campus, and doubled the enrollment.

== Death ==
Schutte died at Erie County Medical Center in Buffalo, New York, on March 26, 2025, at the age of 89.

== Publications ==
- Schutte, Thomas F. (1963). An Exploratory Study of Executives' Perceptions Toward Business Ethics (Thesis). University of Colorado.
- Schutte, Thomas F., ed. (1975). The Art of Design Management, Design in American Business (1 ed.). Philadelphia, PA: University of Pennsylvania Press. ISBN 0812276868.
