= Michael Malpass =

American sculptor (1946–1991)

- Born: 1946; Yonkers, New York, US
- Died: 1991 (aged 44–45)
- Spouse: Cathleen Malpass

Michael Allen Malpass (1946–1991) was an American artist, best known for his large, intricate sphere sculptures forged and welded from discarded metals.

Malpass experimented with multiple visual media to find his way as an artist, leaving behind an expansive record of creative development. As he came of age, it was the manipulation of metal shapes, extracted from the earth, manufactured by unknown persons for any number of purposes, and left behind for salvage, that caught Michael's imagination. Passion for transforming metal shapes into beautiful objects led him to hone welding and traditional blacksmithing techniques required to exert his will over steel, bronze, copper, brass, or any combination of metals that he could find with intent to purge the industrial life out of them. Freed, revitalized, time to become art. Malpass was among the most creative and prolific artists of his generation.

In 2018, the book Humdinger was published. Written by his son of the same name, Humdinger is considered to be the definitive record of the artwork and life of the artist.

== Life ==
Michael Malpass was born on August 18, 1946, in Yonkers, New York. In 1965, he enrolled at Pratt Institute in Brooklyn, where he would ultimately earn his BFA (1969), MFA (1973), and MS (1977). Malpass was drafted and served in the US Army in 1970, where he was a Spec 4 Sergeant stationed in Berlin, and earned a medal of commendation for creating a part welded to the howitzer that extended its firing range. After his military service, he returned to NY and became an Instructor (Welding & Forge, 1972–1975), Assistant Professor (Sculpture, 1975–1980), and Associate Professor (Sculpture, 1980–1987) at Pratt, before deciding in 1987 to concentrate on his sculpture full-time from his home in Brick Township, NJ. Through the remainder of the 1980s, he enjoyed an especially productive period with simultaneous commissions, gallery shows, exhibits, and museum interest. Michael Malpass died at the age of 44 on February 13, 1991 at Brooklyn College, where he was filling in for a friend by teaching a sculpture class. He was survived by his wife, Cathleen Malpass, and four children.

== Exhibitions ==
Malpass' first exhibition was in 1977, a solo show at The Betty Parsons Gallery in Manhattan.

One of his works was among several pieces pictured on the cover of the March 1979 issue of ARTnews magazine that featured Betty Parsons.

Several of his spheres were included in the 1997 Pete Hamill book, "Tools as Art: The Hechinger Collection."

His work has been extensively exhibited. Particularly notable was the Michael Malpass Retrospective ant Monmouth University's Pollak Gallery in 2016.

In addition to a large body of installations and commissions, his work can be found in museums and public and private collections around the world.

Cathleen Malpass represents the work of her late husband through the Cathleen Malpass Gallery, that she constructed in his former studio space in Brick Township, NJ

== Sculpture ==
Michael Malpass produced hundreds of sculptures that both challenged and adhered to classical aesthetic standards.

Malpass focused much of his effort on creating spherical shapes, primarily using found metal objects. He would often say, “The sphere is the most perfect form. The sphere is whole. The form is simple, yet the surface is complicated. The structure is animated, yet peaceful.”

He worked with other forms as well, including one departure that morphed into an important and comprehensive body of work he dubbed "chicken men." The chicken men were reviewed in ARTnews in May 1984, and were often exhibited along with the spheres.

Believing as he did in the process of creating, Malpass also left a body of sculptural works that cannot be categorized as spheres nor chicken men, yet were created with the same exquisite technique and emotional content that Malpass employed in creating all of his artwork.
