= Pratt Institute =

Private university in Brooklyn, New York, US

- Motto: Be true to your work, and your work will be true to you
- Type: Private university
- Established: 1887 (139 years ago)
- Founder: Charles Pratt
- Endowment: $371 million (2025)
- President: Frances Bronet
- Academic staff: 880 (full-time); 1,086 (part-time)
- Students: 5,232 (fall 2023)
- Undergraduates: 3,814 (fall 2023)
- Postgraduates: 1,418 (fall 2023)
- Location: New York City, New York, 11205, United States; 40°41′28″N 73°57′50″W
- Campus: Large city, urban, 25 acres (10.1 ha)
- Colors: Yellow, black, gray, and white
- Nickname: Cannoneers
- Sporting affiliations: NCAA Division III - Atlantic East
- Mascot: Charlie the Cannoneer
- Website: pratt.edu

Pratt Institute is a private university with its main campus in Brooklyn, New York. It has an additional campus in Manhattan and an extension campus in Utica, New York at the Munson-Williams-Proctor Arts Institute. The institute was founded in 1887 with programs primarily in engineering, architecture, and fine arts. Comprising six schools, the institute is primarily known for its programs in architecture, graphic design, interior design, industrial design, and fine arts.

== History ==
=== Inception ===
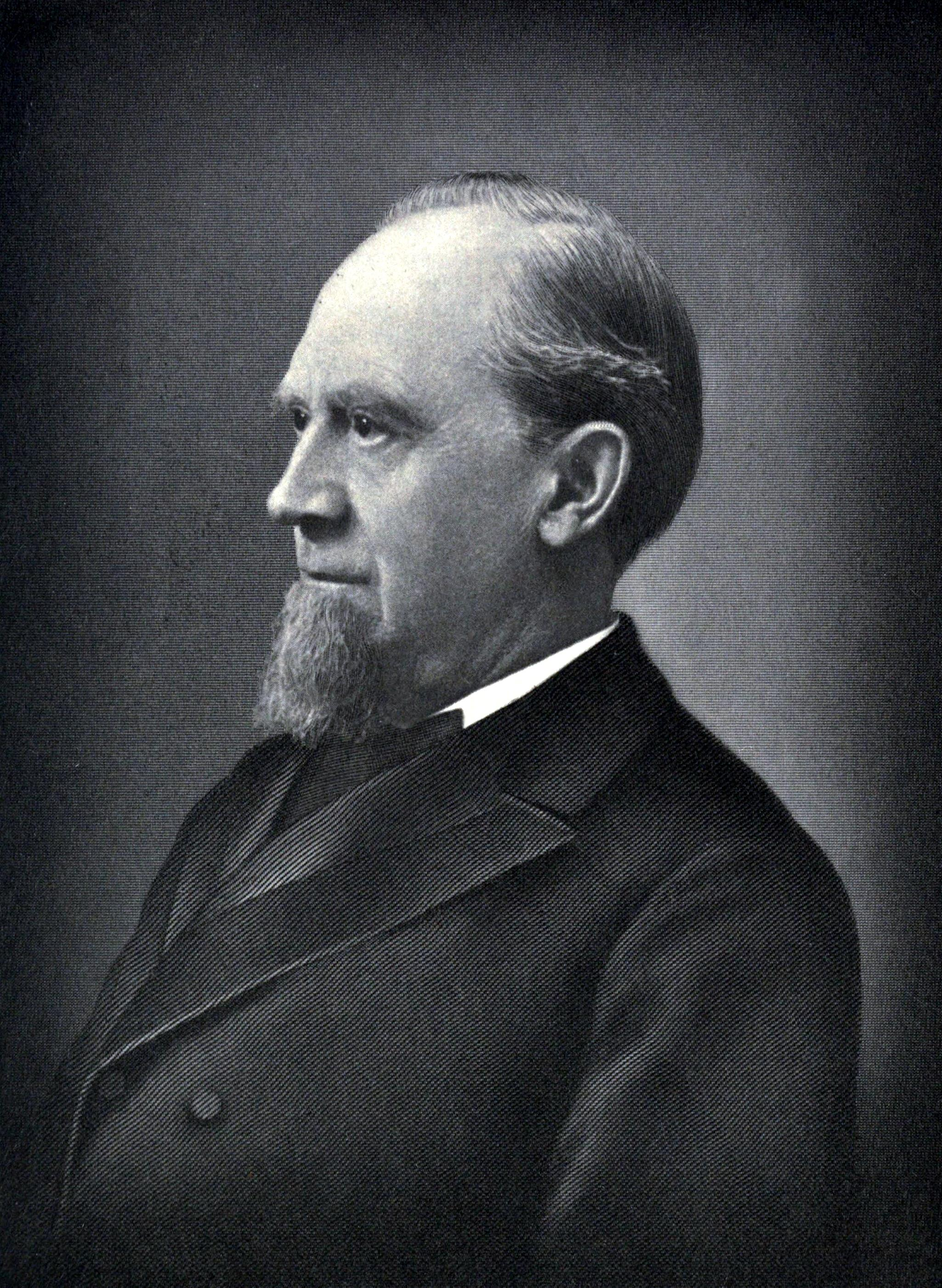
Charles Pratt, founder of Pratt Institute

Pratt Institute was founded in 1887 by American industrialist Charles Pratt, a successful businessman, oil tycoon, and one of the wealthiest men in the history of Brooklyn. He was an early pioneer of the oil industry in the United States. He was the founder of Astral Oil Works based in the Greenpoint section of Brooklyn, which was a leader in replacing whale oil with petroleum. In 1867, he established Charles Pratt and Company, and in 1874, his companies amalgamated with John D. Rockefeller's companies. They became part of the Standard Oil trust, where Pratt continued his active involvement on the board and the running of it.

Pratt, an advocate of education, wanted to provide working men and women the opportunity to better their lives through education. He had never had the chance to go to college himself, and wanted to create an affordable college accessible to the working class. In 1884 he purchased large plots of land near his home in Clinton Hill to open a school. It would end up being built only two blocks from his residence on Clinton Avenue.

Utilizing his fortunes with Astral Oil and Charles Pratt and Company, in 1886 he endowed and founded Pratt Institute. In May 1887, the New York State Legislature granted Charles Pratt a charter to open the school. On October 17, 1887, the institute opened to 12 students in the Main Hall. Tuition was $4 per class per term (approximately equivalent to $143.3 in 2025).

The college was one of the first in the country open to all people, regardless of class, color, and gender. In the early years, its mission was to offer education to those who never had it offered to them before.

Pratt believed that teaching technical skills - drawing, building, designing - promoted intellectual thought and creativity. Many programs were tailored to the growing need to train industrial workers in the changing economy with training in design and engineering. Early programs sought to teach students a variety of subjects, such as architectural engineering, mechanics, dressmaking, and furniture making. Graduates of the school were taught to become engineers, mechanics, and technicians. Drawing, whether freehand, mechanical, or architectural, thought of as being a universal language, united such diverse programs, and thus all programs in the school had a strong foundation in drawing. The curriculum was complemented by a large liberal arts curriculum. Students studied subjects such as history, mathematics, physics, and literature to better understand the world in which they would be working, which is still used in Pratt's curriculum.

=== Early years ===
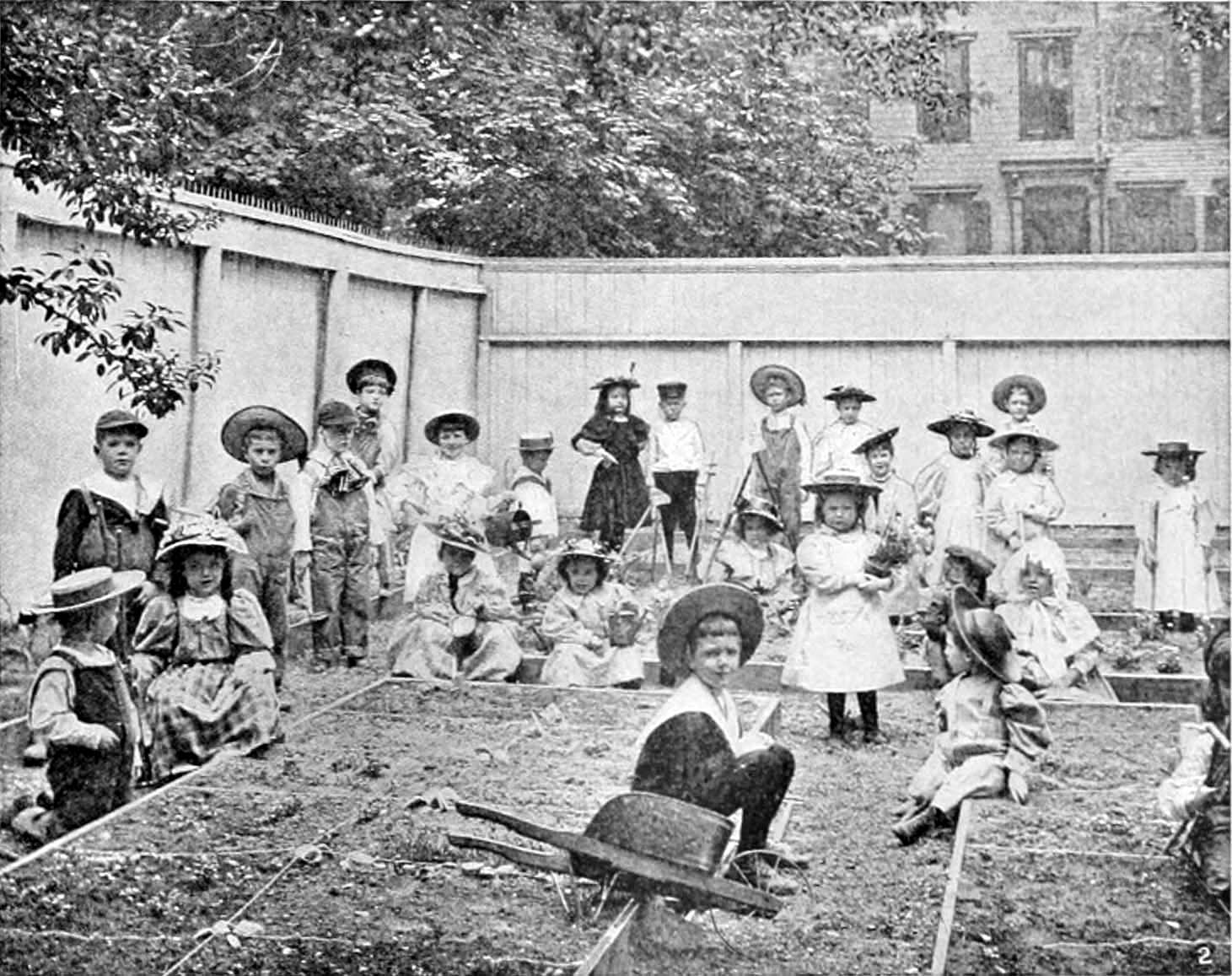
Pratt Institute Kindergarten, 1905

Enrollment grew steadily from its inception. Six months after opening, the school had an enrollment of nearly 600 students. By the first anniversary of the school, there were 1,000 students in attendance. In five years, there were nearly 4,000. In 1888, Scientific American said that the school was "undoubtedly the most important enterprise of its kind in this country, if not in the world". Andrew Carnegie visited Pratt for inspiration and used the school as a model in developing Carnegie Technical Schools, now Carnegie Mellon University. At the first Founder's Day celebration in 1888, Charles Pratt addressed what would become the school's motto: "be true to your work and your work will be true to you"—meaning that students should educate and develop themselves diligently and go out into the world working hard, giving all of themselves.

As public interest grew and demand increased, the school began adding new programs, including the Pratt High School, Library School, Music Department, and Department of Commerce. Because of the overwhelming popularity of the Department of Commerce, the department broke off from the main institute and formed its own school, under the guidance of Norman P. Heffley, personal secretary to Charles Pratt. The Heffley School of Commerce, the former Pratt Department of Commerce, originally having shared facilities with Pratt, evolved into Brooklyn Law School.

In 1891, Charles Pratt died, and his eldest son, Charles Millard Pratt, became president of the school. In 1923, Pratt's other son, Frederic B. Pratt, was elected president of Pratt Institute, taking over from his brother. Because Charles Pratt Snr. died so soon after the college was founded, Frederic Pratt is ascribed with guiding the college through its early decades. Under the direction of Pratt's sons, the institute thrived both financially and critically, with many new construction projects and courses. By 1892, the number of students enrolled was 3,900. In 1897, the most popular major was domestic arts.

In 1896, the school opened its monumental Victorian-Renaissance Revival Library, with interiors designed by the Tiffany Decorating and Glass Company, and sprawling gardens. The library was open to students and the general public. The Pratt Institute Library was the first and only public library in Brooklyn for nearly 15 years. It served as a working classroom for the training of librarians, and was one of the first schools of library science. It also had the first reading room for children in New York City.

By the turn of the century, the School of Science and Technology had become Pratt's most prestigious and well-known school, and constituted most of the school's enrollment. Across from East Building on Grand Avenue, the institute constructed a new quad for the engineering school over a quarter of a century. The Chemistry, Machinery, and Engineering buildings were constructed in the same architectural style, unifying all disciplines offered by the school. Pratt also had a variety of courses dedicated specifically to women. The 25 courses women could partake in included library science, nursing, home economics, and fashion.

By 1910, all of the departments of the institute were organized as individual schools, including the Library School, School of Domestic Science, School of Fine and Applied Arts, and School of Science and Technology.

=== Degree-granting status and increase in enrollment ===
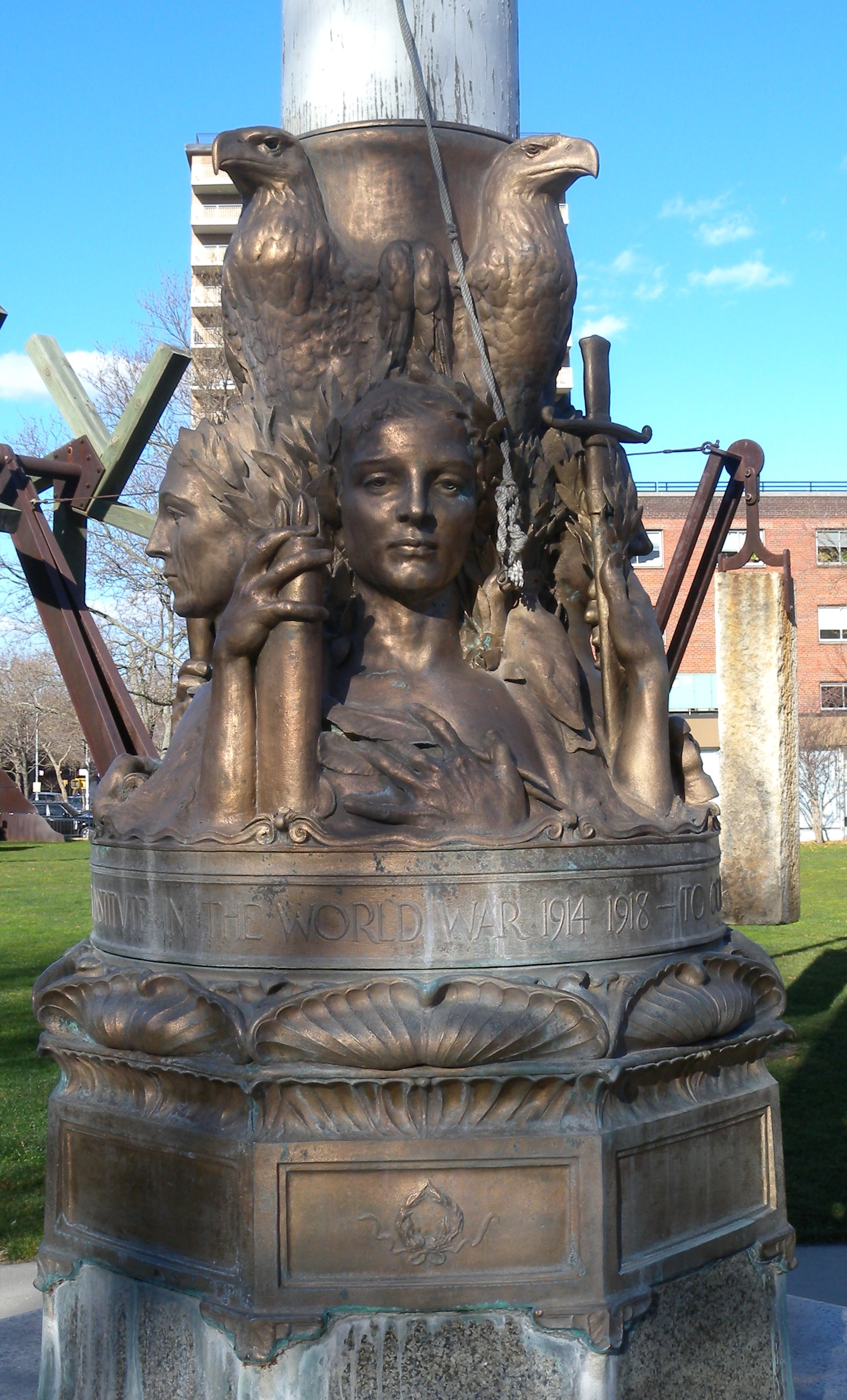
World War I memorial in the Rose Garden

As World War I loomed in 1914, Pratt partnered with the United States government to aid the war effort. The School of Science and Technology had its own Student Army Training Corps, which taught enlistees engineering skills needed for the war. Students designed aircraft used in the war. In 1927, mechanical engineering alumnus Donald A. Hall designed the Spirit of Saint Louis, used by Charles Lindbergh in the first transatlantic flight.

By 1938, most programs at the school had begun offering four-year Bachelor of Science degrees, and Pratt transformed itself from a technical school to a college. By granting bachelor's degrees, Pratt had to revise its curriculum from two years to four. The changes also reflected New York State requirements for granting degrees and stricter government and professional licensing regulations for graduates. During this decade, the basic program for all Art School students was founded. In 1940, Pratt began granting graduate degrees.

During World War II, Pratt's engineering school trained servicemen before they were deployed. Students helped to design camouflage for soldiers, buildings, and weapons. Following the war, the school saw a large influx of veterans enrolling as part of the GI Bill.

In the 1940s, the School of Science and Technology changed its name to the School of Engineering. In 1946, it established its own honor society. Mechanical engineering became the most popular major at Pratt.

In 1953, Francis H. Horn became the first president of Pratt who was not a member of the Pratt family.

Enrollment continued to climb throughout the decade, and in 1948 the institute reached an all-time high, with 6,000 students.

By 1950, Pratt had become accredited by the Middle States Association of Colleges and Schools.

In 1954, the architecture department split from the Engineering School to become its own school.

=== Campus reorganization ===
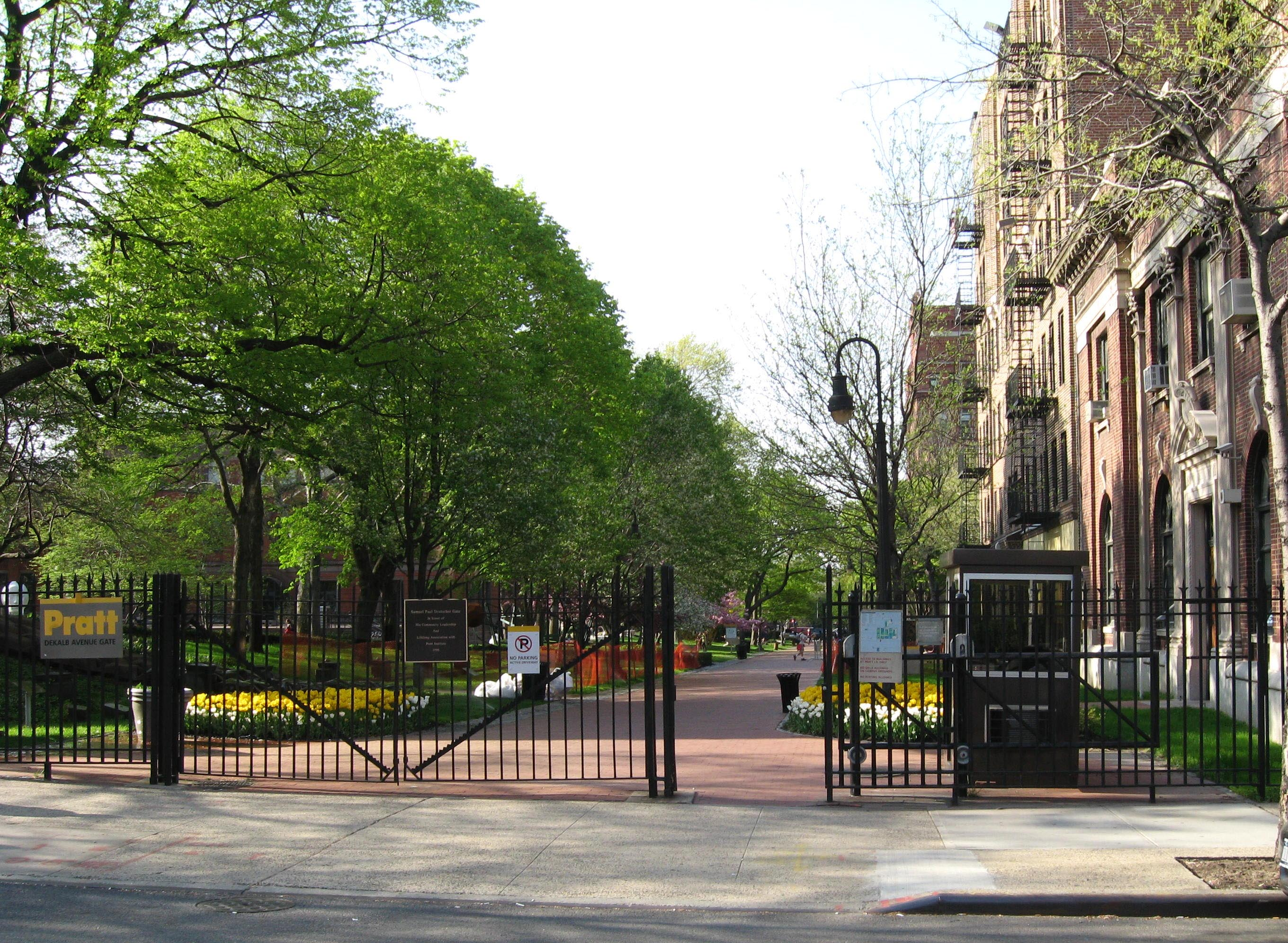
DeKalb Avenue gate of enclosed campus

As part of white flight in the 1950s and 1960s, which affected the majority of New York City the neighborhood of Clinton Hill began to see a transformation from an upper-class, affluent, white community to one chiefly populated by poor and working-class people of color. Pratt considered moving its campus to more affluent Long Island or Manhattan to increase its attractiveness, but decided to stay at its original Brooklyn campus due to its history and Charles Pratt's mission.

As a consequence of Robert Moses' plan for urban renewal in New York City, Pratt's physical campus saw the greatest amount of change in its history. Before the 1950s, the school was located in separate buildings located on several public streets. However, after Moses' clearance of many structures located between Pratt's buildings, including homes, the land was given over to the school, and a true campus was established. Ryerson Street, Grand Avenue, Steuben Street, and Emerson Place were closed to automobile traffic, and the campus was enclosed, forming the Grand Mall to connect the institute's buildings. The elevated train running along Grand Avenue between the East Building/Student Union and the Engineering Quad was dismantled. On the new real estate, the school was able to build several new structures, Dekalb Hall, Information Science Center and North Hall, all designed by the firm of McKim, Mead & White, including the Information Science Center and Dekalb Hall, as well as a new student union. Moses' construction projects around the school helped to build the School of Architecture. Research funds were granted to the school to help discover new building techniques. By 1963, the urban planning department formed the Pratt Center for Community Development in an attempt to revitalize Pratt's surrounding neighborhood and Brooklyn.

=== Enrollment decline and financial issues ===
In the 1970s and continuing well into the 1980s, New York City and Brooklyn faced large amounts of crime and poverty. Enrollment fell, and the school had a budget deficit. Prospective students and faculty felt uneasy about the safety of the campus and community.

In 1974, the men's basketball team came to the attention of national media outlets when Cyndi Meserve joined the team, becoming the first woman to play men's NCAA basketball.

More students earned architecture degrees than mechanical engineering degrees in 1975. Architecture degrees became the most popular degrees at Pratt, and remain so.

In anticipation of the institute's centennial in 1987, several capital improvements were made to the campus, in an attempt to restore many dilapidated buildings. The Grand Mall was re-landscaped with new plantings, brick pathways, and lighting. The Newman Amphitheater was built in 1988.

President Richardson Pratt Jr retired in 1990 after nearly twenty years as president. He was the last president descended from founder Charles Pratt.

In 1993, Thomas F. Schutte was appointed as president, and became the longest-serving president not from the Pratt family.

In the same year, Pratt controversially closed its School of Engineering, as announced in 1991. The School of Engineering had been an integral part of founder Charles Pratt's long-term vision. Historically, the school was Pratt's most successful, and many associated the school with its engineering program. In response to the institute-wide decrease in enrollment and school-wide budget issues, closing the School of Engineering was thought to be the only feasible option to keep the school's other programs afloat, and to address the budget. Students in the Engineering program were transferred to Polytechnic Institute of New York University, while tenured professors were relocated to the School of Architecture and the science and math departments in the School of Liberal Arts and Sciences.

=== Revitalization and growth ===
By closing the costly School of Engineering, the school was able to clear its debt and get on the track to financial success. Funds were allocated for campus-wide beautification projects and restoration and modernization of historic buildings, starting with Memorial Hall. This included adding the Pratt Institute Sculpture Park in 1999, placing contemporary art sculptures throughout the campus lawns and gardens, making it the largest contemporary sculpture park in New York City.

Pratt began a partnership with the Pratt Munson College of Art and Design (Utica, New York) and the Delaware College of Art and Design (Wilmington, Delaware) for art students to study for two years at either campus and finish their degrees at Pratt's School of Art and Design in Brooklyn.

During the 1990s, the school increased enrollment by twenty-five percent, from approximately 3,000 students in 1990 to 4,000 students in 2000.

Vincent A. Stabile, a 1940 graduate of the School of Engineering, donated about $13 million to Pratt, the largest donation made by any alumnus in the college's history, with the request to President Schutte that the funds be used to reopen the School of Engineering. President Schutte rejected Stabile's request, and allocated his funds to construct a new residence hall named in his honor.

From the mid-1980s to the 2000s, Pratt transitioned from being mainly a commuter school to a residential school, through the construction of new residence halls Cannoneer Court, Pantas Hall, and Stabile Hall.

== Organization ==
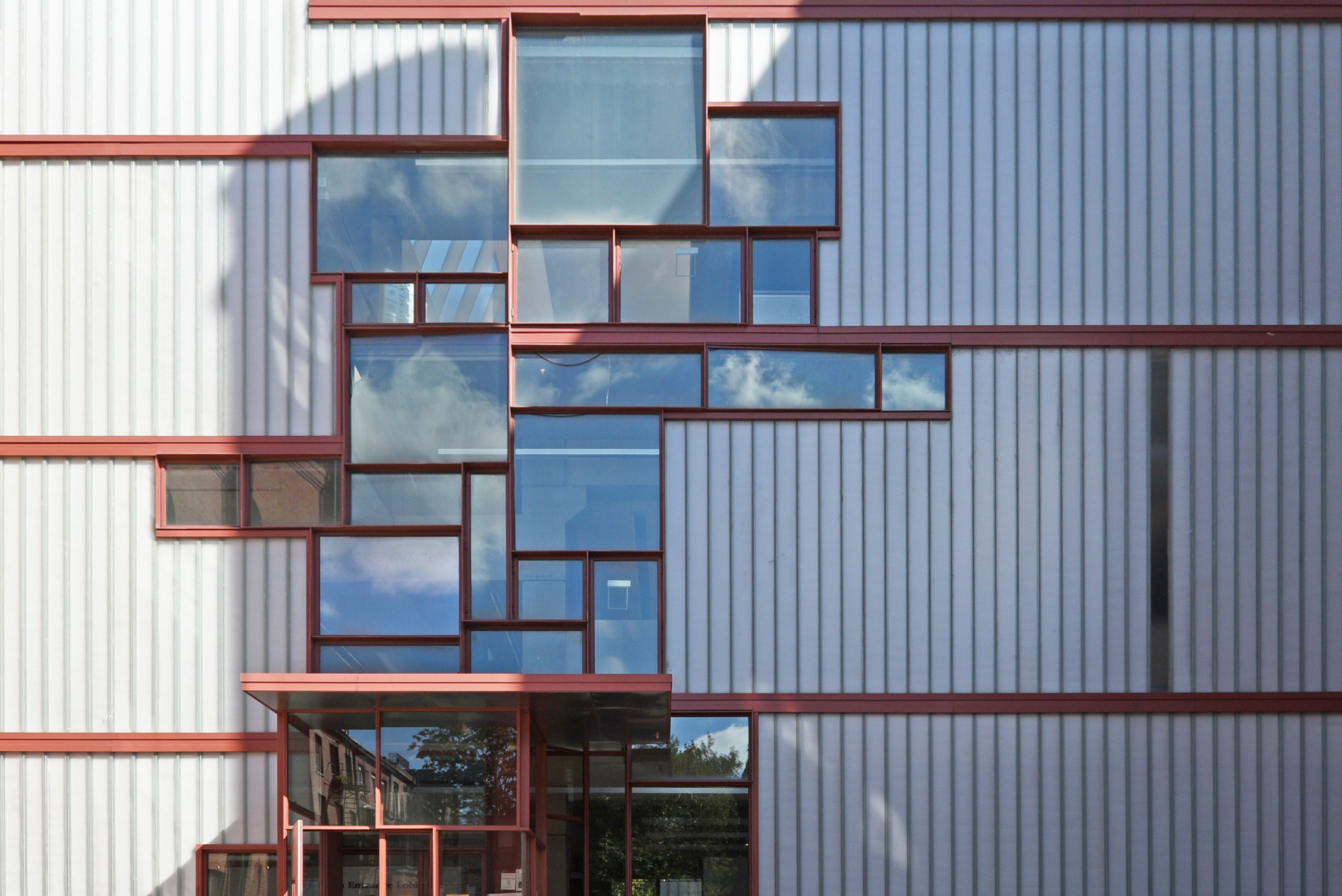
Higgins Hall main façade of the School of Architecture

The Pratt Institute is divided into six schools and more than 28 departments and divisions, offering over 22 undergraduate majors and 25 graduate majors. The schools are:

- School of Architecture
- School of Art
- School of Design
- School of Liberal Arts and Sciences
- School of Information
- School of Continuing and Professional Studies

The Pratt Institute also operates the Pratt Institute Libraries.

Former schools of the Pratt Institute include:

- School of Domestic Arts and Sciences
- School of Engineering

== Academics ==
=== Joint degree programs ===
Brooklyn Law School and Pratt Institute jointly sponsor a program leading to the degrees of Juris Doctor (J.D.) and Master of Science (M.S.) in City and Regional Planning.

=== Accreditation ===
Pratt Institute is accredited by the Middle States Commission on Higher Education, and is authorized to award academic degrees by the State of New York, following guidelines established by the New York State Department of Education.

The Bachelor of Architecture degree and the Master of Architecture degree at the School of Architecture are accredited by the National Architectural Accrediting Board. The undergraduate interior design program is accredited by the Council for Interior Design Accreditation.

Graduate programs in library and information science, art therapy, and art education are all accredited by the Committee on Accreditation of the American Library Association, Education Approval Board of the American Art Therapy Association, and RATE, respectively. The School of Art and Design is part of the Association of Independent Colleges of Art and Design.

=== Rankings ===
In its 2025 list, U.S. News & World Report ranked several Pratt Institute's graduate programs highly: #15 in Best Fine Arts Programs, #11 in Painting/Drawing, #29 in Best Library and Information Studies Program, and #10 in Archives and Preservation. The Bachelor of Architecture program has been ranked as being in the top fifteen programs in the United States consistently since 2000, according to Architectural Record.

While Kiplinger's Personal Finance previously named Pratt as one of the country's best values in private colleges and universities, it was no longer listed in their rankings as of 2019. It was previously included as one of the top values for academic quality and affordability, out of more than 600 private institutions.

In 2023 and 2024, Pratt Institute was ranked sixth globally, according to the QS World University Rankings by the subject Art and Design.

== Campus ==
=== Brooklyn campus ===
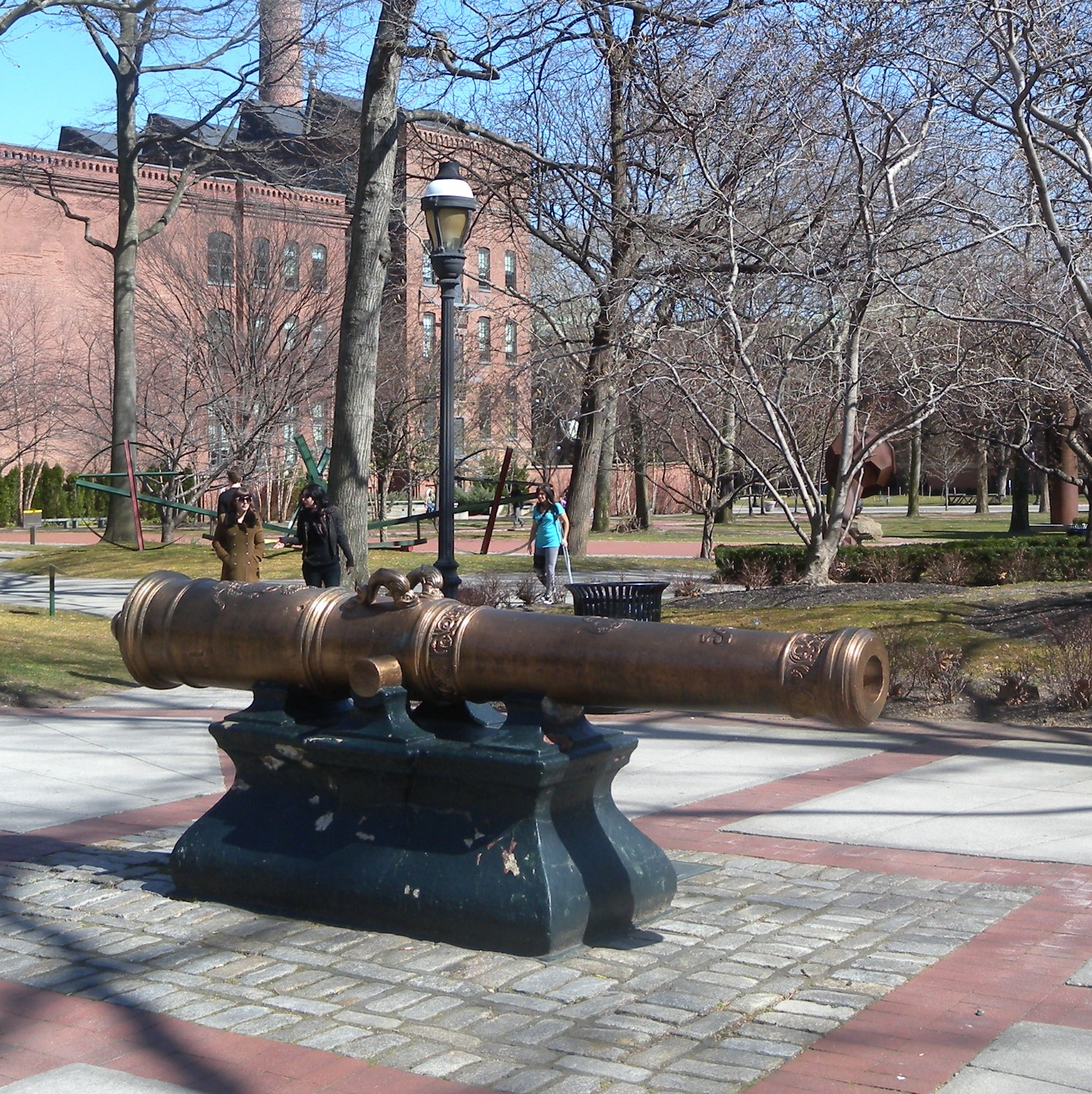
Cannon Court

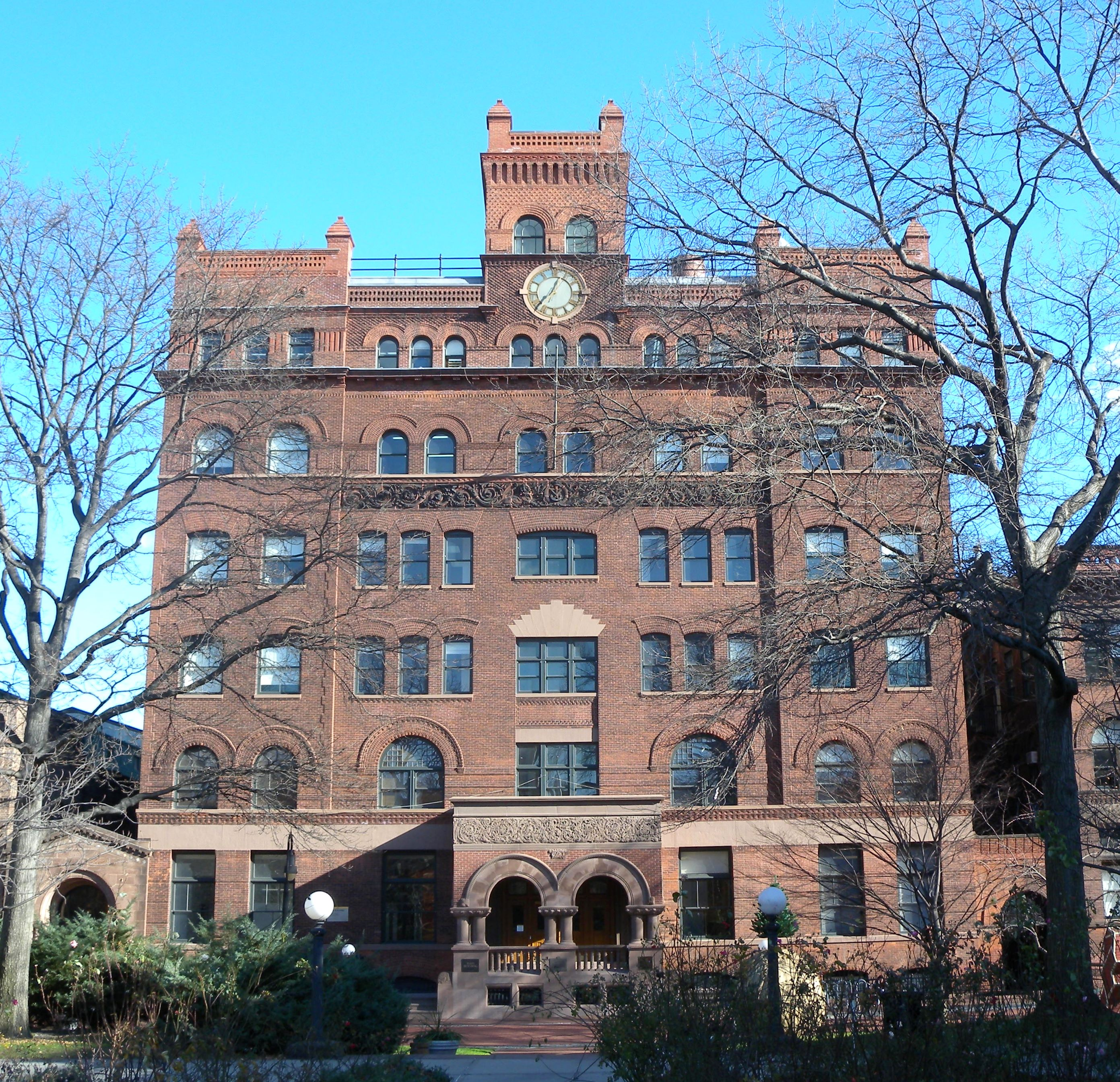
Main building as viewed from Rose Garden

Pratt Institute's main campus is located on a historic, esteemed, enclosed 25-acre (100,000 m^{2}) campus located in the Clinton Hill neighborhood in Brooklyn, 2 miles from Downtown Brooklyn and 3 miles from Lower Manhattan. Midtown Manhattan is just 5 miles from the campus.

The campus is accessible by two public entrances, both of which close in the evening hours and are guarded by security 24 hours a day. The main gate located at Willoughby Avenue on the north side of campus is accessible for pedestrians and vehicles, while the secondary pedestrian-only gate located at the corner of Hall Street and DeKalb Avenue at the southwest part of campus is convenient for commuters and for students to get to Higgins Hall. Three other swipe card access gates are only for student use. The campus is very park-like and fully landscaped, and provides a stark contrast to the urban neighborhood that surrounds the school.

The four main areas of the campus include the Library Rose Garden, Cannon Court, Newman Mall and Amphitheater, and the Engineering Quad:

- The historically significant Rose Garden is located directly north of the library and was built as a part of the library acting as a public park. At the center of the garden is a 1926 World War I memorial to commemorate the men and women of Pratt Institute in the war.
- The Cannon Court is located directly south of the library and serves as the main entrance from the Hall Street gate. A central feature of the court is a large bronze Spanish cannon from 1720, originally from Seville, Spain, and brought to Pratt from Morro Castle in Havana, Cuba in 1899. Trees and meandering pathways lead to the library and Newman Mall.
- The Newman Mall takes up the center of the campus, with many of the academic buildings alongside the mall. The mall is characterized by brick pathways with mature trees lining a central lawn. To the north of the mall is a small amphitheater, designed by Skidmore, Owings and Merrill.
- The Engineering Quadrangle, which is recognized as a historic landmark, is located north of the Newman Mall toward the eastern side of campus. The Chemistry, Machinery, and Engineering buildings enclose the quad, which has terraced landscaping and gardens with many mature trees.

The entire campus is open to the public as park space during the daytime. Throughout the campus, many contemporary sculptures fill the gardens and landscape. The Pratt Sculpture Park, founded in 1999, is the largest contemporary sculpture park in New York City, and includes more than 40 pieces at any given time installed across the 25-acre campus in Brooklyn. Artists who have loaned their work to the park include Shin Sang Ho, Mark di Suvero, Donald Lipski, Tom Otterness, Richard Serra, Takashi Soga, Gunnar Theel, and Allan Wexler.

=== List of sculptures on campus ===
Displayed since	Name of sculpture	Artist
2016	La Méditerranée	Philippe Anthonioz
1981	Accord Final	Arman
1999	Picnic Table	Siah Armajani
1993	Leaf	Ilan Averbuch
2005	The Book of Stone and Steel	Ilan Averbuch
2011	Maze 1	Phyllis Baker Hammond
1995	Image 95	Masaru Bando
2014	Whispering Bench— Texting	Cathey Billian
1995	Wind Reeds	Bill & Mary Buchen
2007	Seven of Hearts	Noël Copeland
2009	Brooklyn Blooms	Noël Copeland
2013	Half Story Mountain	Grayson Cox
2002	Jive	Mark di Suvero
2013	Learning	Anne Gillen
1988–1993	Leucantha	Philip Grausman
2004	Epistrophy, Straight No Chaser, Round Midnight	Richard Heinrich
2005	Skylark	David Henderson
2009	Silo	Tomasz Jan Groza
2001	Fourth Dimension	Ann Jon
2008	Segmented Flower Form Part 1	Mary Judge
2011	24M	Michael Kalish
2001	Lions at the Gate	Wendy Klemperer
1990–1999	6 Copper Spheres	Grace Knowlton
2003	Saratoga Winter	Harry E. Leigh
1996	F.R.S.B.	Donald Lipski
2000	Uplifting	Sandy Macleod
1979	Untitled	Michael Malpass
1988	Zinnia	Michael Malpass
1979	Tool Ball	Michael Malpass
1986	Trilogy (square)	Michael Malpass
2012	Ascent	Jackson Martin
2008–2009	Waiting for Coyote	Nao Matsumoto
1996	Manhole Covers	Brad Michael McCallum
2007	Pratt Pillows	Mark Mennin
2007	Untitled	Sung Ha No
Date unknown	Promise	Neil Noland
Date unknown	Spinoff	Neil Noland
2011	Sun	Avital Oz
2006	Object/Product	Mark Parsons
2012	Double Sbalzo	Beverly Pepper
2006	Ecstasy	Nova Mihai Popa
2004	Aerated Rectangles	Salvatore M. Romano
2009–2010	Five Equal Volumes	Salvatore M. Romano
Date unknown	Untitled	Tony Rosenthal
2007	Four Floating Disks	G.A. Ruda
2004	Particle/Wave, Time/Space Continuum	Karl Saliter
2006	Dream of Africa	Shin Sang-ho
2012	Scarce of Fishing	Arden Scott
1990	Chair	Alan Siegel
2014	Intersections: Gardens #4 #5 #6 #7 #8 #9	Arlene Slavin
2007	Block 700	Sean Slemon
2001	Guardian	Leon Smith
2004	Red Cabinet	Leon Smith
2002	Triangle	Leon Smith
2006	Black E.C. Tower	Kenneth Snelson
2003	Silent Beam	Takashi Soga
2000	Siting on His Laurels	Dana L. Stewart
Date unknown	Bench	George Sugarman
Date unknown	Right Angles	Gunnar Theel
2012	Brickhead: Yemanga	James Tyler
Date unknown	Three Cement Goats	Unknown artist
2002	Mier	Boaz Vaadia
2002	Sara	Boaz Vaadia
2002	Rebecca	Boaz Vaadia
2006	Ode to Miles Davis	Hans Van de Bovenkamp
1974	Undulation	Hans Van de Bovenkamp
2009	The End Justifies the Means, Justifies the End...	Martha Walter
2012	Pratt Desk	Allan Wexler
1979	Swirl	Jack Youngerman
1981	Wave	Jack Youngerman
1971	Blade	Jack Youngerman
2006	Welcome II	Raphael Zollinger
2012	Recall	Jean Shin

=== Buildings ===
Pratt is home to a diverse collection of buildings composed of several architectural styles. Most of the buildings at the school were built before World War II in the style of Romanesque Revival, Victorian, and Neoclassical styles, and were designed by prominent nineteenth- and twentieth-century architects. After the war, Pratt began building more contemporary-styled buildings.

In 2011, Architectural Digest named Pratt as one of the top ten most architecturally significant college campuses in the country, for its seamless collection of buildings dating from since the 1800s.

The Main Building, East Hall Building, and Student Union are adjacent to one another, and make up a complex of the original buildings, all built specifically for the institute in 1887:

- Located in the north-central part of campus, the Main Building is a six-story Romanesque Revival brick building designed by Lamb and Rich. It was the first building to open at the school. The roof features an iconic clock tower which overlooks the Rose Garden. The building houses administrative offices, classrooms, and art studios for the Arts Department of the School of Art and Design. In February 2013, a fire throughout the top floors destroyed much of the interior structure and students' work.
- East Hall is located directly behind Main Hall, and faces Grand Walk. Designed by William Windrim, a main feature of the brick building is the large smokestack which served the institute's power generation plant. The hall houses student services including Career Services, Student Activities, International Student Affairs, and the Pratt Chapel. Located in the lower level of the building is Pratt's continuously operating, privately owned, steam-powered electrical generating plant, built originally to serve the power needs of the school. In 1977 the facility was recognized by the American Society of Mechanical Engineers and named a National Mechanical Engineering Landmark. As part of its goal of reducing emissions 40 percent by 2040, Pratt plans to transition its steam-powered electrical generating plant away from burning natural gas or heavy oil. In 2023, Pratt Institute removed two combustion engineering water tube boilers, and replaced these boilers with two Cleaver Brooks fire tube boilers.
- The Student Union, by architect William Tubby, was originally built as the Trade School building. Soon after completion, it was remodeled as the Student Union, complete with a gymnasium and swimming pool. In 1982 the building was renovated again as the new Student Union. All three buildings wrap around an interior courtyard that connects with the Newman Mall and Library Rose Garden. The centerpiece of the courtyard is a 17th-century Italian marble well-head fountain purchased by the Pratt family in 1900. Renovated again in the summer of 2018, the Student Union is a place for the Pratt community to gather, study, relax, and innovate.

Other structures include:

- South Hall, located along Reyerson Walk to the direct south of Main Building, was finished in 1892 by William Tubby and was built as the Pratt High School. When the high school closed near the turn of the century, the building was used for the School of Domestic Arts and Sciences. The building is now home to classrooms, studios, and offices for programs in the Department of Fine Arts, part of the School of Art and Design.
- Pratt Institute Library, which was opened in 1888 to serve students and the general public, became the first free public library in Brooklyn. Its architect was William Tubby of Brooklyn. The interior in the building was done by the Tiffany Glass and Decorating Company.
- The Chemistry, Machinery, and Engineering Buildings are located across from Grand Walk and East Building, which are clustered around the Engineering Quad's lawn and gardens. They were built in phases between 1908 and 1928, and were designed by architecture firm Howells & Stokes. These buildings originally housed courses for Pratt's School of Engineering until it was dismantled in 1993. The machinery building includes a print lab, metal shop, ceramics studios, and wood shop. The second floor of the Engineering building now houses Pratt's largest computer lab on campus, with several classrooms of Mac and PC workstations, and a collection of scanners, printers, and plotters. The basement contains Pratt's Material Lab and Center for Sustainable Design Strategies.
- The school's auditorium, Memorial Hall, was built in 1927, with John Mead Howells serving as the architect. It is located across from the Rose Garden along Reyerson Walk, between the Main Building and North Hall.
- Built as part of the urban renewal project led by Robert Moses, North Hall is located directly north of Memorial Hall and was designed by McKim, Mead, and White in 1958. Ithouses Pratt's Main cafeteria and the school's bank. Classrooms for the School of Liberal Arts and Sciences are on the upper levels.
- DeKalb Hall and the Information Science Center were also designed by McKim, Mead, and White, in 1955. They originally served as men's and women's dormitories, until Pratt acquired Willoughby Hall. After the acquisition of Willoughby, the buildings were remodeled to serve classroom and administrative needs. DeKalb Hall, located to the far west of campus and south of the Library and Cannon Court, is home to administrative offices. The Information Science Center is also located to the far west of campus, north of the Library and Rose Garden, which was home to the School of Information.
- The Juliana Curran Terian Design Center is made up of two separate wings, Steuben Hall to the east and Pratt Studios to the west, which hold all of Pratt's design programs. Located at the southern edge of the campus between Pantas Hall and the Athletics and Recreation Center, this building is home to the Interior Design, Industrial Design, Communication Design, and Fashion Design Departments, as well as the givetake art supply recycling initiative. At the center of the building is a small courtyard. Originally the center was two separate buildings that were acquired by Pratt in 1962 and 1970, respectively. These were factories, originally built around the turn of the century. A new glass and metal entry pavilion, named in honor of architecture alumnus and donor Juliana Curran Terian, was constructed in 2007, and was designed to the two original, separate, brick buildings. The lead architect for the project was the School of Architecture's dean, Thomas Hanrahan.
- Myrtle Hall is Pratt's newest building, opened in 2010. The building, located one block north of campus, was designed by Pratt Institute School of Architecture alumnus Jack Esterson AIA of the New York City architecture and engineering firm WASA/Studio A, and has achieved LEED Gold Certification. The building houses Student Services (registrar, bursar, and financial aid), Admissions, the Pratt Center for Community Development, and the Digital Art Center.
- The Caroline Ladd Pratt House is owned by the school. It is used as the college president's mansion and for gala events. It was completed in 1898 and designed by architects Babb, Cook, and Willard for Frederic B. Pratt, the institute's third president, the son of Charles Pratt. It is four blocks west of the school on Clinton Avenue, near the other Pratt family mansions.
- Higgins Hall, one block south of the main campus, houses the entire School of Architecture, with the exception of Construction Management programs. The historic Romanesque Revival landmark building with a contemporary center wing houses the school's administrative offices, computer labs, student classrooms, laboratories, a lecture hall, a small café, and the Hazel and Robert H. Siegel Gallery. The building was originally built for the prestigious Adelphi Academy, now Adelphi University, in phases from 1868 through 1890, by Mundell and Teckritz and Charles C. Haight. Charles Pratt also partially funded the construction of the building as part of his philanthropic efforts. The building was given to Pratt Institute in 1965 by the wife of John Higgins, architect and alumni of Adelphi Academy. The School of Architecture was relocated here. In 1996, the building experienced a major fire, destroying the center wing and severely damaging the northern and southern wings. In 2005, the school replaced the center wing with a new sleek and contemporary glass structure, which linked the historic brick northern and southern wings, designed by Steven Holl, and incorporated complementary contrast to the original essence. As part of the rebuilding of Higgins Hall, Rogers Marvel Architects restored and renovated the original nineteenth-century wings to their former glory.
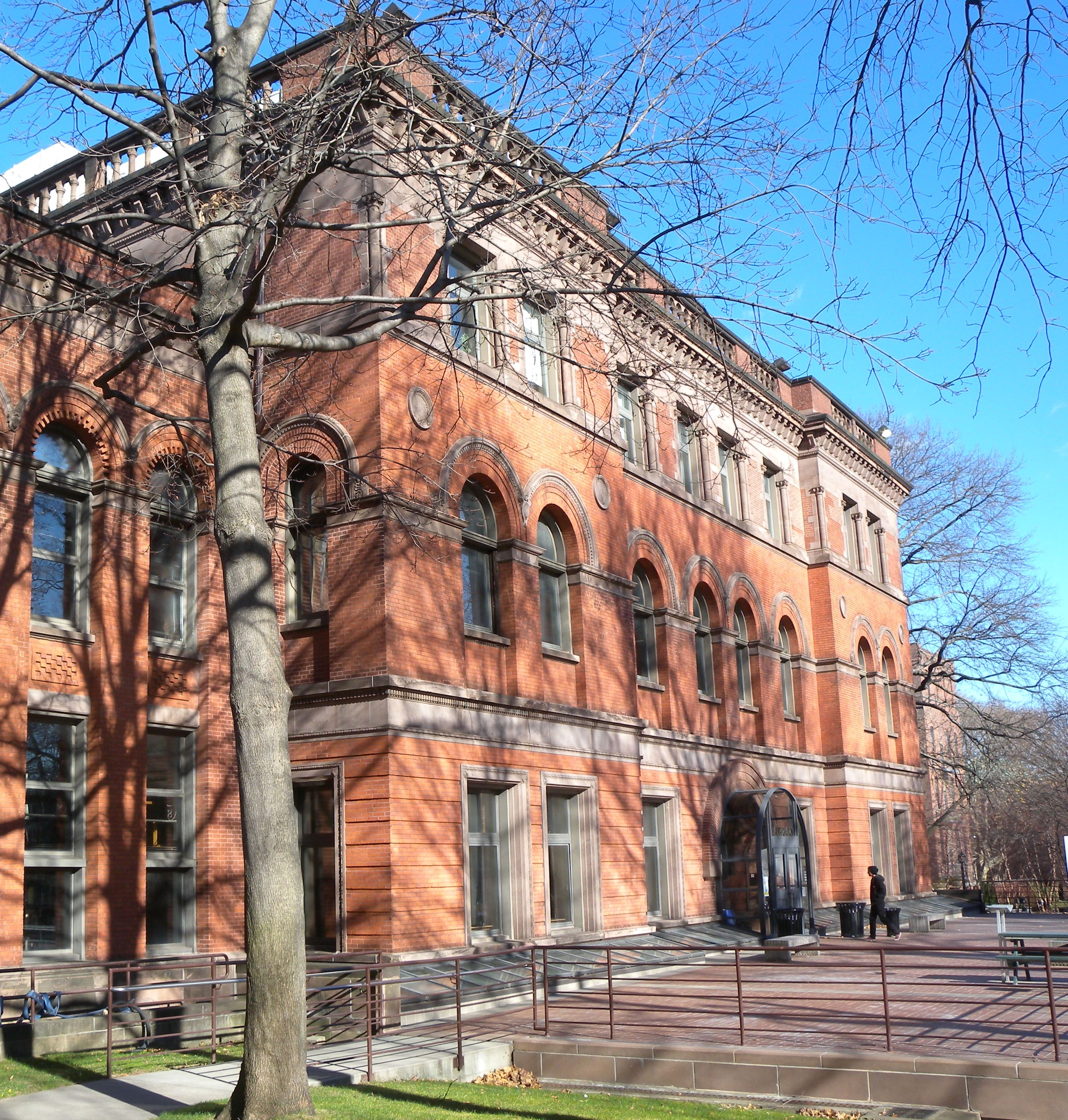
Library

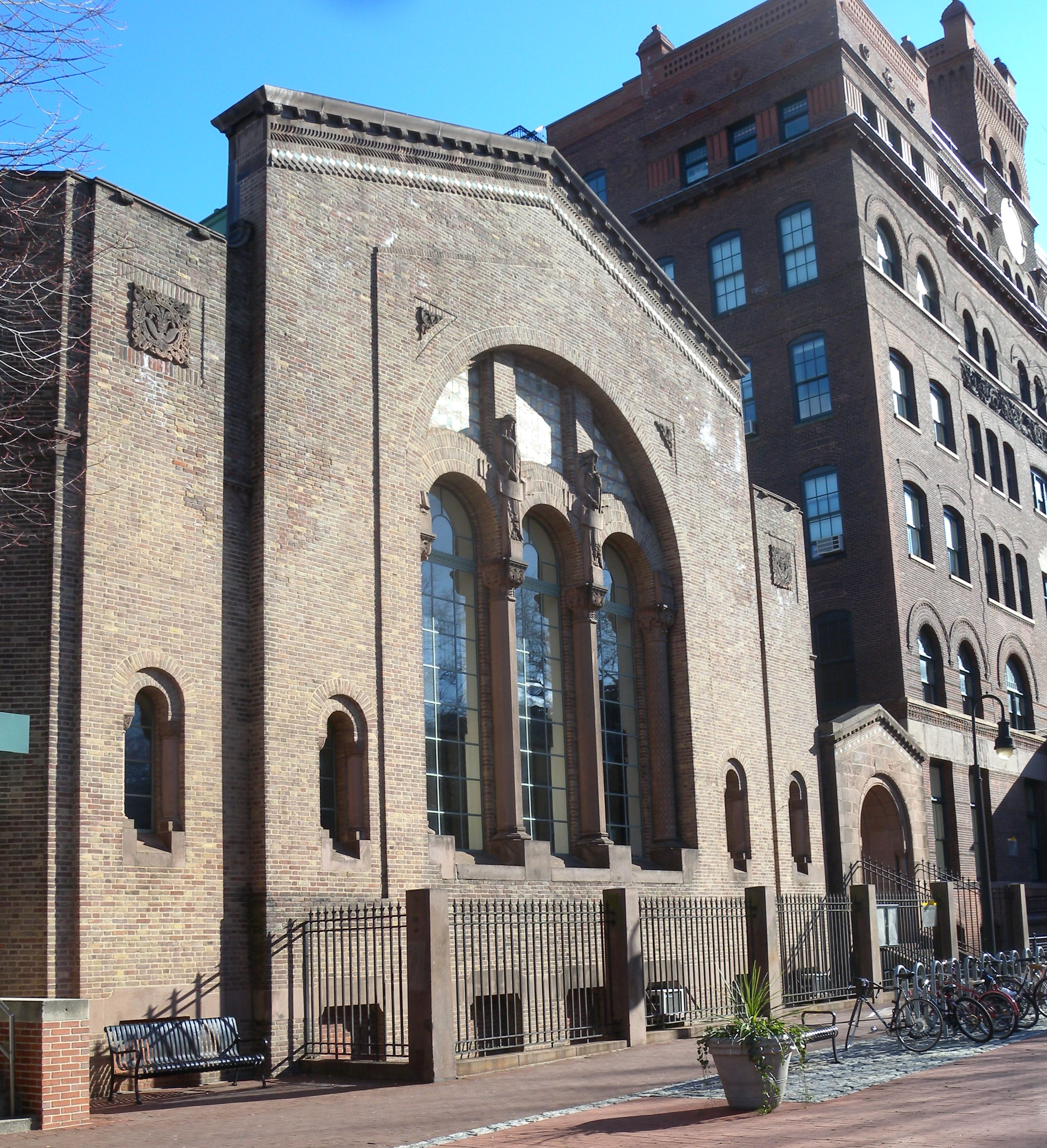
Memorial Hall

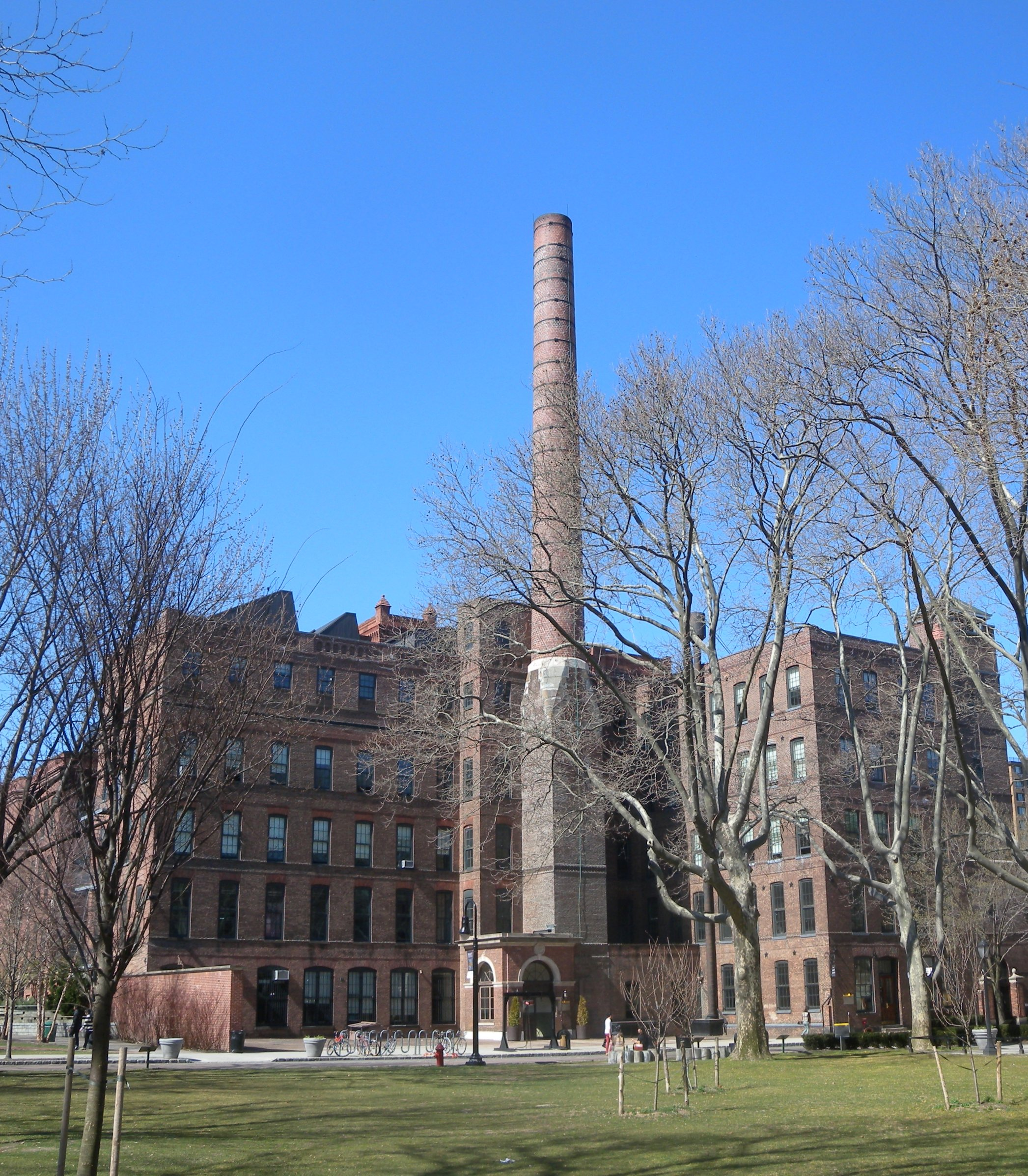
East Hall

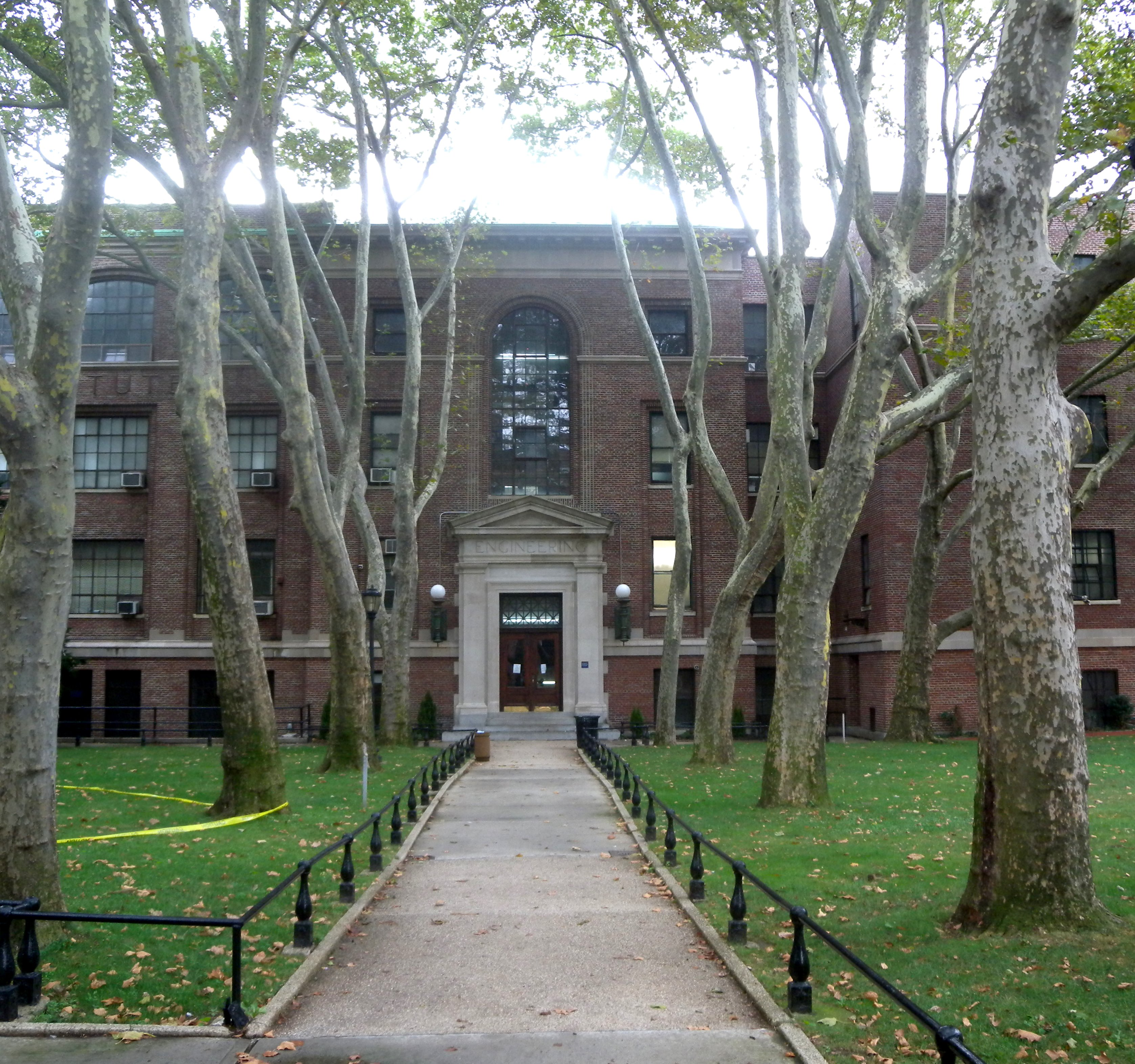
Engineering Building

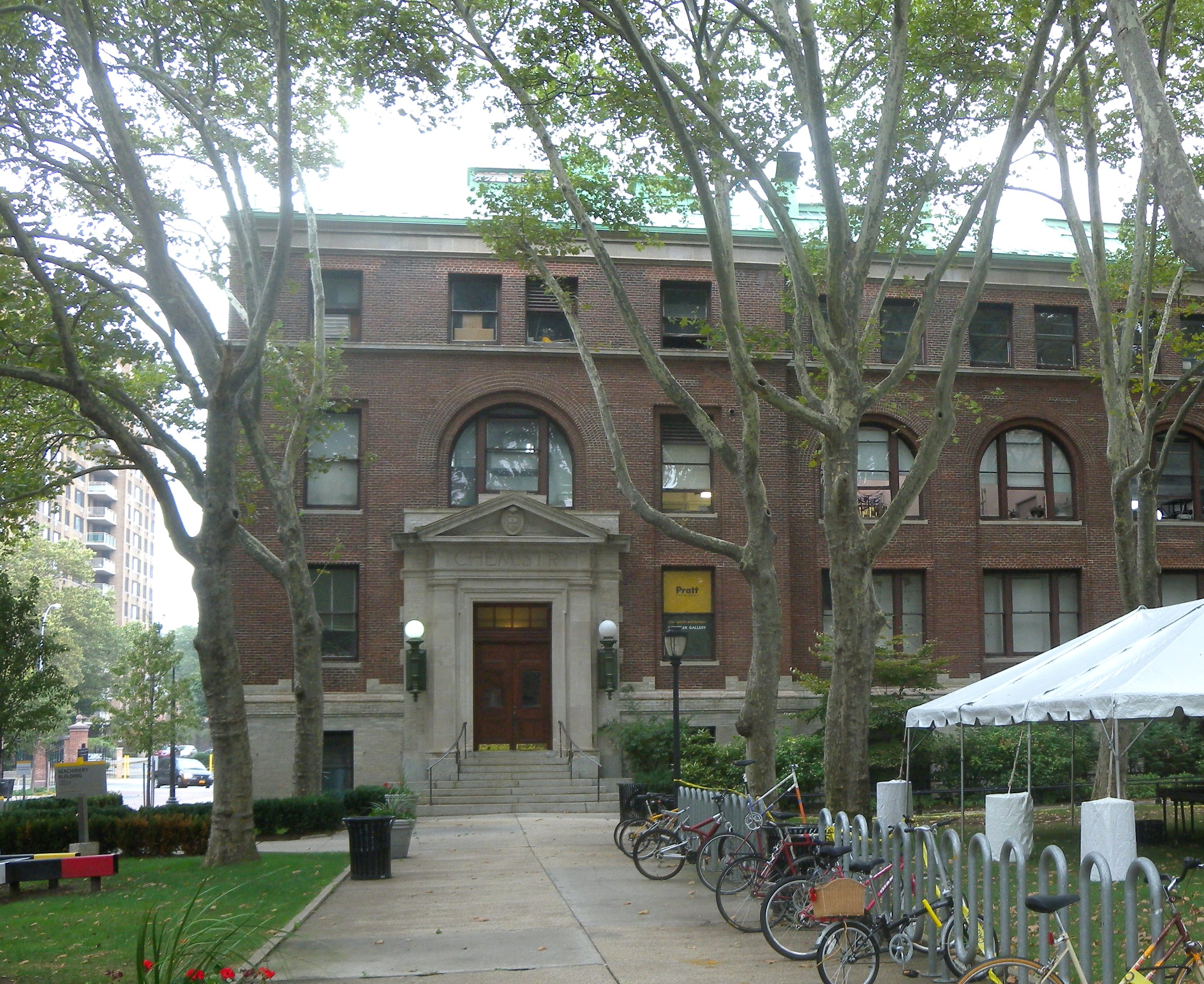
Chemistry Building

=== Historic sites ===
- Pratt Institute Historic District
- U.S. National Register of Historic Places
- U.S. Historic district
- New York State Register of Historic Places
- Location within New York City Location within New York Location within the United States
- Location: Roughly bounded by Hall St., Dekalb Ave., Willoughby St., and Emerson Pl., Brooklyn, New York
- Area: 9 acres (3.6 ha)
- Architect: Multiple
- Architectural style: Late 19th- and 20th-century revivals, Renaissance, Romanesque
- NRHP reference No.: 90001138

Significant dates
- Added to NRHP: March 23, 2005
- Designated NYSRHP: March 15, 1990

Several Pratt buildings and landscapes are historically significant. The Pratt Institute Historic District is a national historic district that comprises 10 contributing buildings built between 1885 and 1936. Several buildings are recognized as being New York City Designated Landmarks. The school was listed on the National Register of Historic Places in 2005, and was awarded the Getty Foundation Campus Heritage Grant. Two buildings outside the historic district, Higgins Hall and the Caroline Ladd Pratt House, are also listed on the historic register as being a part of the Clinton Hill Historic District. The buildings and structures listed on the U.S. National Register of Historic Places for their architectural or historical significance are:

- Caroline Ladd Pratt House
- Chemistry Building
- Children's Portico
- East Hall
- Engineering Building

- Engineering Quadrangle
- Higgins Hall
- Machinery Building
- Main Building
- Main Building Courtyard
- Memorial Hall

- Pratt Institute Library
- Pratt Institute Library Rose Garden
- South Hall
- Student Union

=== Residence halls ===
Pratt, a residential campus, offers seven residence options for its students. All residence hall students are provided with a bed (twin extra-long), desk, chair, and dresser. Students residing in a dorm without in-unit kitchens are required to be on a meal plan (Stabile, Emerson, ELJ, and Pantas), while those with in-unit kitchens can sign up for an optional meal plan (Willoughby and Grand Avenue). Emerson Place, Leo J. Pantas Hall, and Vincent A. Stabile Hall are the primary freshman dorms. In total, 51 percent of undergraduate students reside on campus, while 92 percent of incoming freshmen students reside on campus. Pratt offers the following residence halls for students:

- Esther Lloyd-Jones Hall is named for a trendsetter in modern American higher education. The building was originally a private apartment building built in 1921, and was acquired by Pratt in 1964 to use for dormitories. ELJ accommodates students in single and double rooms in apartment-style accommodations. It is occupied primarily by upperclassmen continuing students.
- Emerson Hall is the newest dorm on the Pratt campus, opening in the fall of 2019. It was built specifically as a freshman dorm. It was collaboratively designed by CannonDesign and Hanrahan Meyers Architects to encourage interaction. The dorm is off campus, across the street from the Film and Video Building. It contains double rooms, with several individual bathrooms and separate, individual shower rooms on each floor, to be shared by floor residents. Each floor also contains a large central common space with a small kitchen.
- Leo J. Pantas Hall was opened in 1987 and designed by Skidmore, Owings and Merrill. It is centrally located on campus. Students live in four-person suites, which consist of two double rooms (two people in each double room). Each suite has a bathroom. Suites are single-sex, but floors are co-ed. The building has work/study rooms and communal lounges. It was designed in brick with a clock tower, echoing the style of the original 1887 main building. Pantas is primarily a freshman residence hall.
- Vincent A. Stabile Hall opened in the fall of 1999 and was designed by Pasanella+Klein, Stolzman+Berg Architects. Named for the donor and graduate of the Engineering School, it was designed for new undergraduate students. It houses 240 students in four-person suites. Each suite consists of two double rooms with a shared bath. There are kitchenettes located on each floor. Stabile is primarily a freshman residence hall.

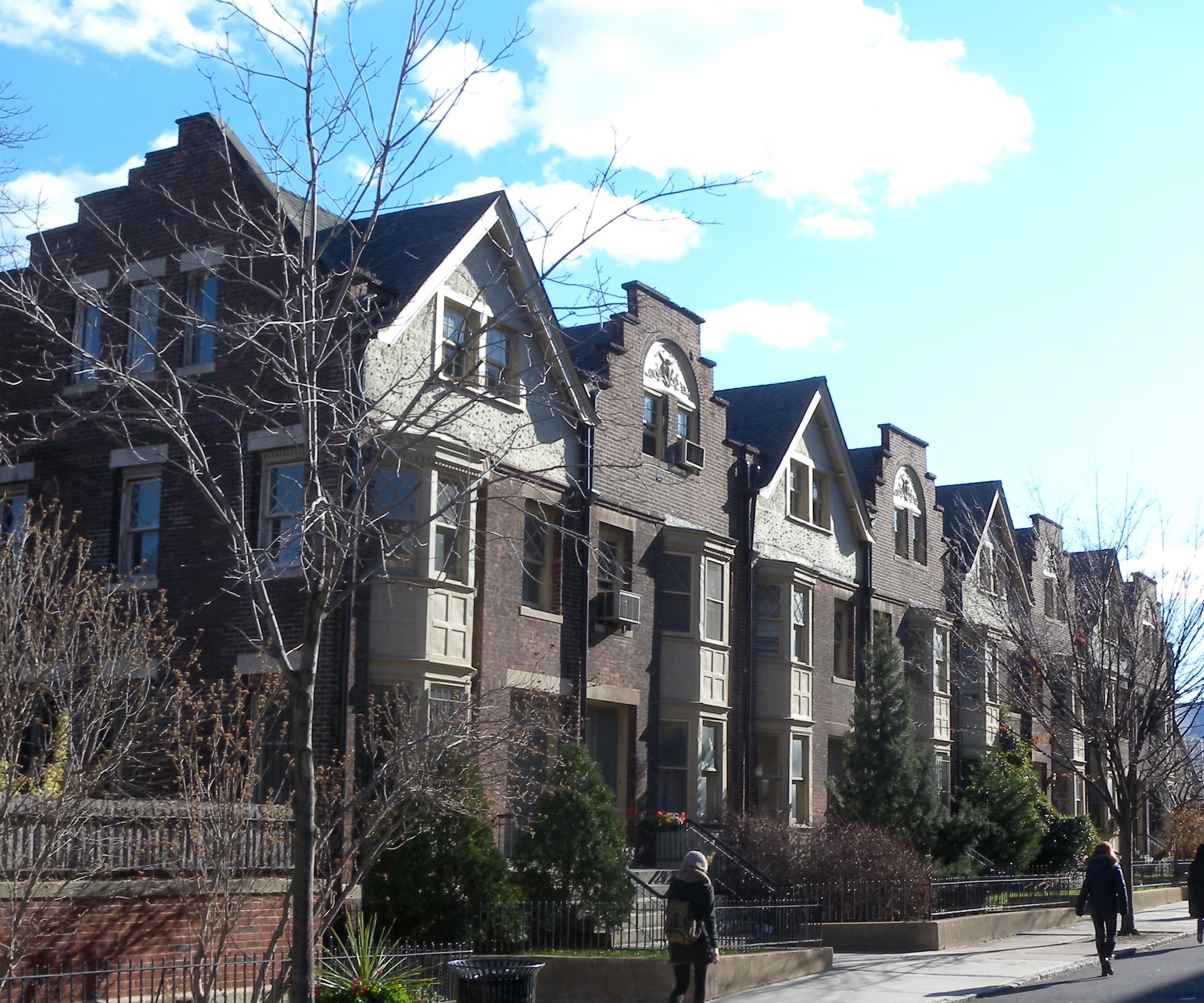
The historic Pratt Townhouses

- The Pratt Townhouses are historic landmarks that were originally constructed from 1901 to 1910 in the colonial revival style to serve as faculty housing. They were designed by Hobart C. Walker. After being neglected for several years, Pratt renovated the townhouses to be used by upperclassmen. Each unit consists of six single rooms spread across three stories, a full kitchen, living room, parlor, basement, and shared backyard.
- Willoughby Hall is a former private apartment building built as part of Robert Moses' urban renewal projects surrounding Pratt, and is the largest residence hall. Built in 1957 by architect John Mead Howells, the 16-story building accommodates 800 undergraduate men and women. In addition to the standard furniture, all apartments have a kitchen table, stove, and refrigerator. All students are assigned to double, triple, or single spaces. The converted apartments consist of at least one double or triple that occupies the former living-room space of the apartment. The number of students residing in a given apartment ranges from two to six, depending on the size of the converted apartment—studio, one, two, or three bedrooms.
- Grand Avenue Residence is home to new and continuing graduate students. The building can accommodate 50 students in efficiency apartments (double and single) and private single rooms within two- and three-bedroom apartments. A double-efficiency apartment is two students sharing a one-room apartment (with a kitchen and bath). A single-efficiency apartment is one student in a private one-room apartment with a kitchen and bath. A shared single is two or more students, each with a private bedroom, sharing a kitchen, bath, and living room. Each living room is furnished with a sofa, club chair, coffee table, kitchen table, and chairs. The building is located one block from campus.

=== Transportation ===
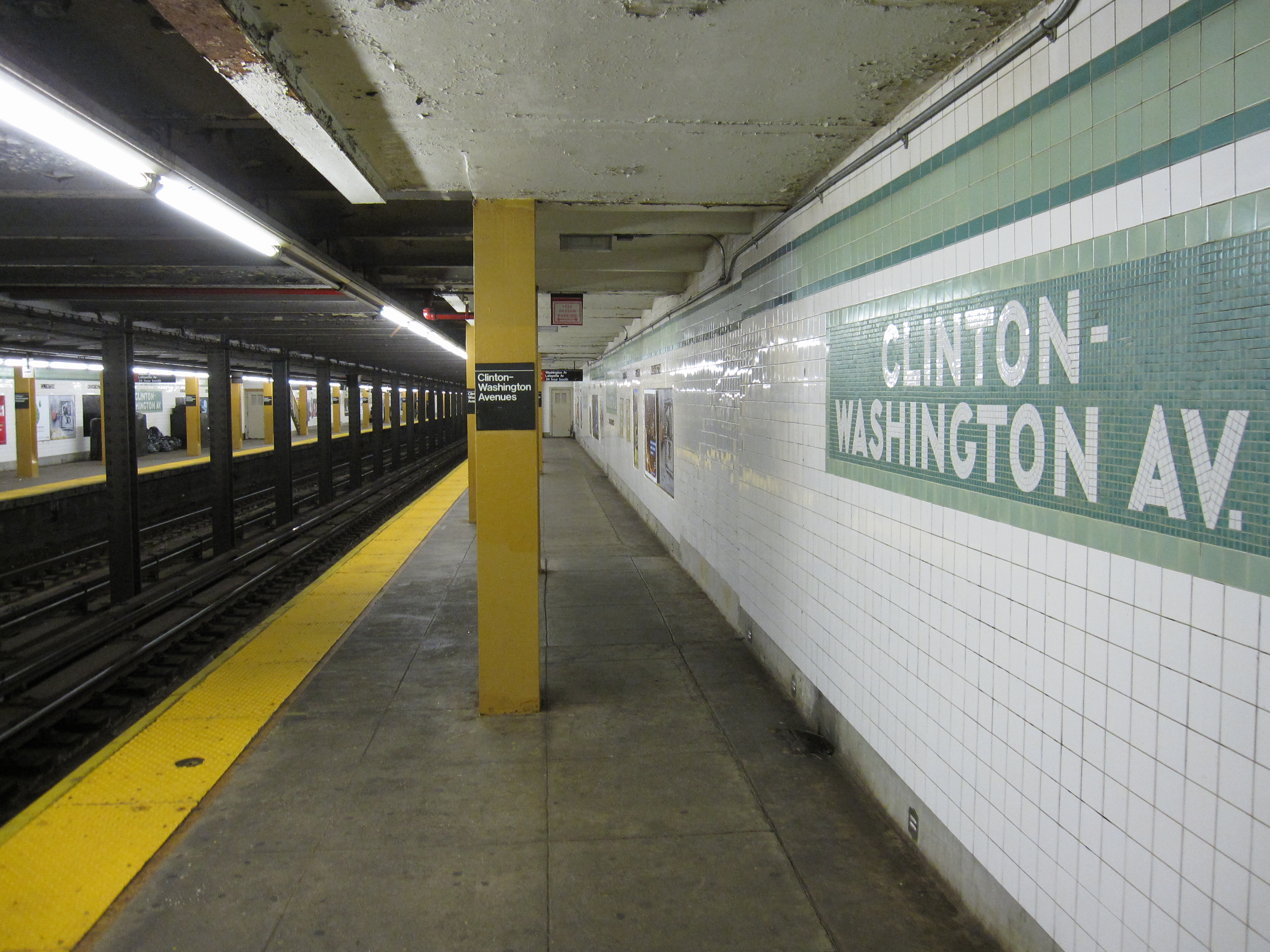
The Clinton-Washington Avenues subway station of the G train is close to Pratt's Brooklyn campus.

Pratt does not provide any official sponsored transportation options for its students, but there are several public transportation options located directly off the main campus.

The school is served by MTA New York City Bus routes, with the B38 bus route servicing the campus to the south with stations along DeKalb and Lafayette Avenues, and the B54 bus route serving the area north of the campus along Myrtle Avenue. In addition, the New York City Subway's G train has one station located at the intersection of Washington and Lafayette Avenues and another located at the intersection of Classon and Lafayette Avenues. The Clinton–Washington Avenues station (IND Crosstown Line) is located directly across the street from Higgins Hall. The Classon Avenue station (IND Crosstown Line) is located one block south of the southeast corner of campus. In addition, the C train has an entrance to Clinton–Washington Avenues station (IND Fulton Street Line) four blocks south of the Hall Gate entrance and three blocks south of Higgins Hall.

New York City's public bike-share program, Citi Bike, has stations nearby at Lafayette Avenue and Saint James Place, at Hall Street and Willoughby Avenue, and Emerson Place and Myrtle Avenue.

The Long Island Rail Road at Atlantic Terminal is located a short walk from the campus. Pratt participates in New Jersey Transit's University Partnership Program, through which students can receive a twenty-five percent discount on monthly passes based out of Penn Station in Manhattan.

=== Manhattan Center ===
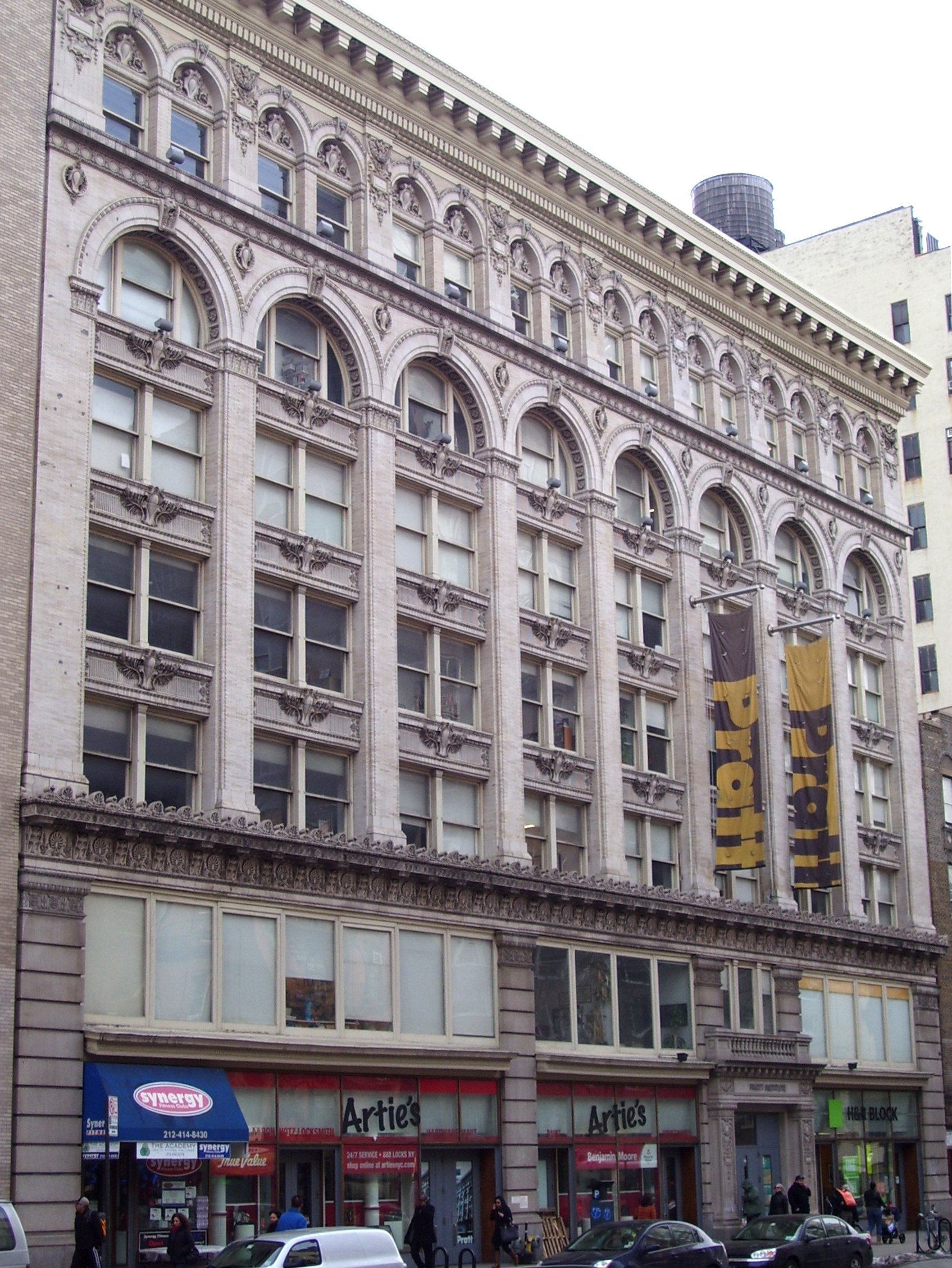
Pratt Manhattan

The Pratt Manhattan Center (PMC) building, located at 144 West 14th Street, between 6th and 7th Avenue, is home to associate degrees programs, a bachelor's degree program, and graduate programs. The School of Continuing and Professional Studies also offers non-credit courses and certificate programs. This seven-story historic building was acquired by Pratt in 2000. The institute restored the building's exterior to its original facade, highlighting its decorative architectural and design elements, and renovated the interior to feature its high ceilings and wood beams.

In 1974, the New York Phoenix School of Design, formerly the New York School of Applied Design for Women and the Phoenix Art Institute, merged with the Pratt Institute to form the Pratt-New York Phoenix School of Design, which offered three-year certificate programs in art and design at least into the late 1970s. It is located in the landmark New York School of Applied Design Building at 160 Lexington Avenue, at the northwest corner of Lexington and 30th Street.

== Student life ==
=== Demographics ===
Ethnic composition of undergraduates 2018–19
	Undergrads	U.S. Census
White (non-Hispanic)	38%	58.4%
African-American	4%	13.7%
Asian American	13%	6.4%
Native American	0%	1.3%
Hispanic American (of any race)	9%	19.5%
Two or more races, non-Hispanic	3%	3.1%
International students	32%	(N/A)
Unknown	1%	(N/A)

Pratt Institute students numbered 3,435 undergraduates and 1,381 graduate students in the fall of 2019 and came from 86 countries and 48 states. Women represented 71% of undergraduates and 74% of graduate students.

=== Clubs and student organizations ===
As of October 2022, Pratt was home to 122 clubs with a wide range of focuses. Clubs include the Pratt Photo League, Latinx Student Alliance, Pratt Institute Botanical Society, Aura Dance Crew, and Students for Socialist Revolution.

=== Student media ===
Pratt has several student media groups, including a film club.

- The Prattler is Pratt's quarterly student magazine/newspaper, established in 1940.
- Static Fish is a comic book publication established over 20 years ago.
- Ubiquitous is Pratt's literary and arts magazine, published twice a year. It holds reading events on campus per semester, and also maintains a blog.
- Pratt's yearbook, Prattonia, is designed by selected students.
- Pratt Radio, a student-run internet radio station, broadcasts on the web. Originally broadcasting from a limited-range signal in the mid-1980s, the FCC stepped in and shut the operation down after students modified the broadcast tower, rendering it pirate radio. The station later re-emerged in 2001 as a legitimate, internet-only station.
- The Felt is an online journal of poetry and prose from the MFA Writing program.

=== Fraternities and sororities ===
The Inter-Greek Council is responsible for all Greek life organizations at Pratt Institute. Pratt offers one fraternity for male students and two sororities for female students:

- Kappa Sigma
- Theta Phi Alpha
- Sigma Sigma Sigma

== Athletics ==
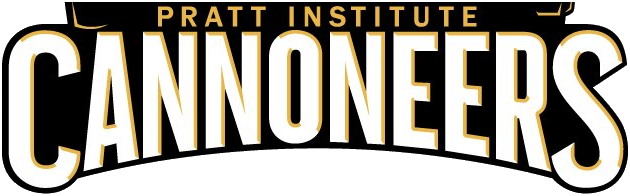
Pratt Cannonneers wordmark

Pratt was awarded full Division III membership in the National Collegiate Athletic Association (NCAA) on September 1, 2022.

The Cannoneers joined the Atlantic East Conference (AEC) in the 2024–25 academic year, and are the only New York institution in the seven-member league.

Pratt sponsors 14 NCAA intercollegiate programs and is a member of the Coast to Coast Conference (C2C), with men's volleyball being a member of the Colonial States Athletic Conference (CSAC). Pratt began its transition to NCAA Division III with an exploratory season in 2018–19, which was rewarded with provisional membership the following year.

The Cannoneers previously competed in the Coast to Coast Athletic Conference (C2C) from 2020–21 to 2023–24 and in the American Collegiate Athletic Association (ACAA) during their NCAA Division III exploratory status from 2018–19 to 2019–20.

=== Facilities ===
Designed by Ezra Ehrenkranz and Daniel Tully and constructed in 1974, the Activity Resource Center is the main hub for Pratt Athletics and Recreation. The ARC boasts several courts for recreational and competitive activities, a fitness and performance room, a multi-use studio room, a 200-meter indoor track, a boxing and functional fitness area, and over 41,000 square feet of open event space.

It previously hosted the annual Colgate Games, the nation's largest amateur track series for girls from elementary school through college.

== People ==
=== List of presidents ===
1. Charles Pratt (1830–1891), president 1887–1891
2. Charles Millard Pratt (1855–1935), president 1891–1893
3. Frederic B. Pratt (1865–1945), president 1893–1937
4. Charles Pratt (1892–?), president 1937–1953
5. Francis H. Horn, president 1953–1957
6. Robert Fisher Oxnam (1915–1974), president 1957–1960
7. Richard H. Heindel (c.1913–1979), president 1961–1967
8. James B. Donovan (1916–1970), president 1968–1970
9. Henry Saltzman, acting president 1970–1972
10. Richardson Pratt Jr. (1923–2001) (grandson of Charles Millard Pratt; great-grandson of Charles Pratt), president 1972–1990
11. Warren F. Ilchman (1933–), president 1990–1993
12. Thomas F. Schutte (1936–2025), president 1993–2017
13. Frances Bronet, 2018–present

=== Notable faculty members ===
- Andrea Ackerman, artist
- Joseph Barbera, animator and co-creator of the Tom and Jerry series of animated shorts
- Karen Bausman, architect
- Jonathan Beller, film theorist
- Jonas Coersmeier, architect
- Peggy Cyphers, painter
- Arthur Deshaies, printmaker
- Eva Díaz, art historian
- Arthur Wesley Dow, decorative arts
- Greg Drasler, painter
- Shannon Ebner, photographer, chairperson of the photography department
- Fritz Eichenberg, printmaker
- Fifi Ekanem Ejindu, architect
- Carla Gannis, artist
- Tula Giannini, musicologist, information scientist
- Eric Goldberg, film director and animator
- Charles Goslin, graphic designer
- Philip Guston, painter
- Bruce Hannah, industrial designer
- James Hannaham, writer
- Stephen Hilger, photographer
- Philip Johnson, architect
- Ralph Johonnot, taught color theory, decorative arts, and interior design (1909–1912), former head of the design department
- Peter Kayafas, photographer
- Sean Kelly, writer
- Josh Koury, filmmaker
- Manuel de Landa (adjunct), philosopher, artist
- Thomas Lanigan-Schmidt, painter
- Jacob Lawrence, painter
- John Lehr, photographer
- Matthew Leifheit, photographer
- Sibyl Moholy-Nagy, architectural and art historian
- Sergio Rossetti Morosini, painter, sculptor
- Anna Moschovakis, poet, novelist, translator
- Mario Naves, art critic
- Toshio Odate, Japanese woodworker, sculptor
- Denis Peterson, painter
- Reeva Potoff, artist and educator
- Nick Relph, photographer and filmmaker, K–12 center instructor
- Carissa Rodriguez, photographer
- Carole Rosenthal, English and Humanities professor emeritus
- Carrie Schneider, photographer
- Nasser Sharify, father of international librarianship
- Matthew Sharpe, author
- Anna Shteynshleyger, photographer
- Eliza Swann (adjunct), artist, writer
- Mickalene Thomas, artist
- Milagros de la Torre, photographer
- Anne Turyn, photographer
- Charles Warner, architect
- Eva Zeisel, ceramic artist/designer
