= Malpais-Sint Michiel =

Wetland on Curaçao in the Dutch Caribbean

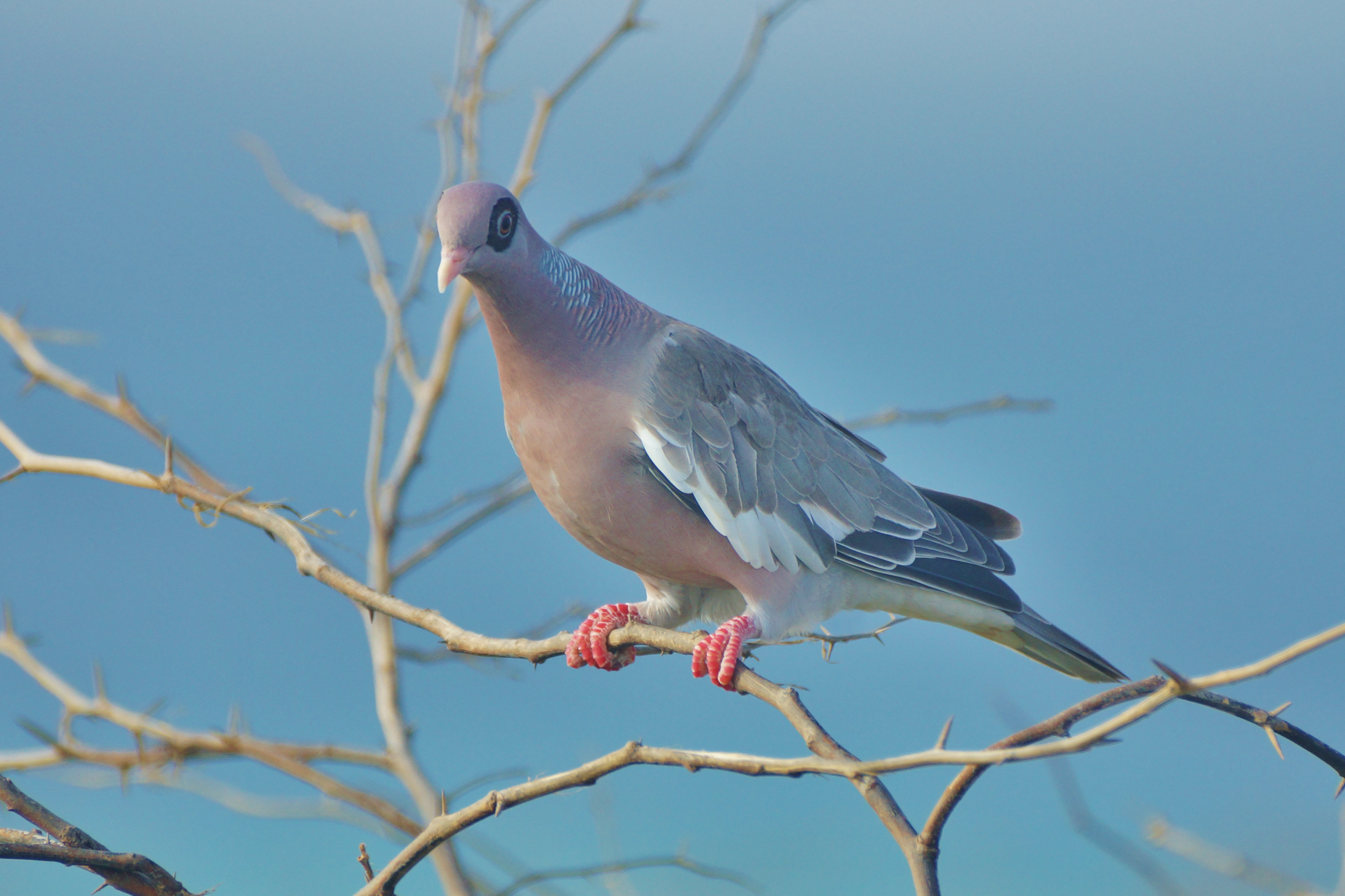
- Bare-eyed pigeons live in the IBA

- Location within Curaçao
- Location: Curaçao
- Nearest city: Willemstad
- Coordinates: 12°09′26″N 68°59′25″W
- Area: 11 km^{2} (4.2 sq mi)
- Established: 2013

Ramsar Wetland
- Official name: Malpais/Sint Michiel
- Designated: 5 February 2013
- Reference no.: 2117

Malpais-Sint Michiel is a 1,100 ha tract of land, a former plantation just north of Sint Michiels Bay, on the southern coast of Curaçao, a constituent island nation of the Kingdom of the Netherlands in the Dutch Caribbean. It has been identified as an Important Bird Area by BirdLife International because it supports populations of bare-eyed pigeons, American coots, common terns and Caribbean elaenias, as well as a large brown-throated parakeet roost. It comprises two wetlands – a freshwater dam and a saline lagoon – with their surrounding thorn scrub vegetation. The waterbodies are used by a variety of waterbirds, including American flamingos, and the vegetation is used by resident and migratory passerines as well as by wintering raptors. The area has also been recognised as a Ramsar site as a wetland of international importance.
