= Malpaso =

Malpaso may refer to:

- Malpaso Creek, Monterey County, California, USA
- Malpaso Dam, Mexico, officially known as the Nezahualcóyotl Dam
- Malpaso Productions, Clint Eastwood's production company
- Pico de Malpaso, the highest point on El Hierro, Canary Islands
- The song "Malpaso Man" by the British band Visage
