= Malpas (surname) =

Malpas is a surname. Notable people with the surname include:

- Charles Malpas (1899–1982), Australian inventor and businessman
- George Malpas, English actor, known for Tom Grattan's War
- Jeff Malpas (born 1958), Australian philosopher
- Maurice Malpas (born 1962), Scottish footballer
- Robert Malpas (1927–2023), British engineer and businessman
