= Friends and Lovers =

Friends & Lovers may refer to:

== Film ==
- Friends and Lovers (1931 film), starring Adolphe Menjou and directed by Victor Schertzinger
- Friends & Lovers (1999 film), an American romantic-drama film starring Stephen Baldwin and Claudia Schiffer

== Music ==
- "Friends and Lovers" (Gloria Loring and Carl Anderson song), 1986
- "Friends and Lovers" (Bernard Butler song), 1999
- Friend & Lover, an American folk-singing duo composed of the husband-and-wife team, Jim and Cathy Post
- Friends and Lovers (album), a 1999 album by Bernard Butler
- Friends & Lovers (album), a 2014 album by Marsha Ambrosius

== Television ==
- Friends and Lovers (TV series) (also known as Paul Sand in Friends and Lovers), 1974–1975 TV series set in Boston starring Paul Sand
- "Friends & Lovers" (CSI), an episode of the American television series CSI
- "Friends and Lovers" (NCIS), an episode of the American television series NCIS
- "Friends and Lovers" (Three's Company episode), an episode of the American television series Three's Company
- "Friends and Lovers" (Melrose Place episode), an episode of the American television series Melrose Place
