= Bernard Butler =

English musician (born 1970)

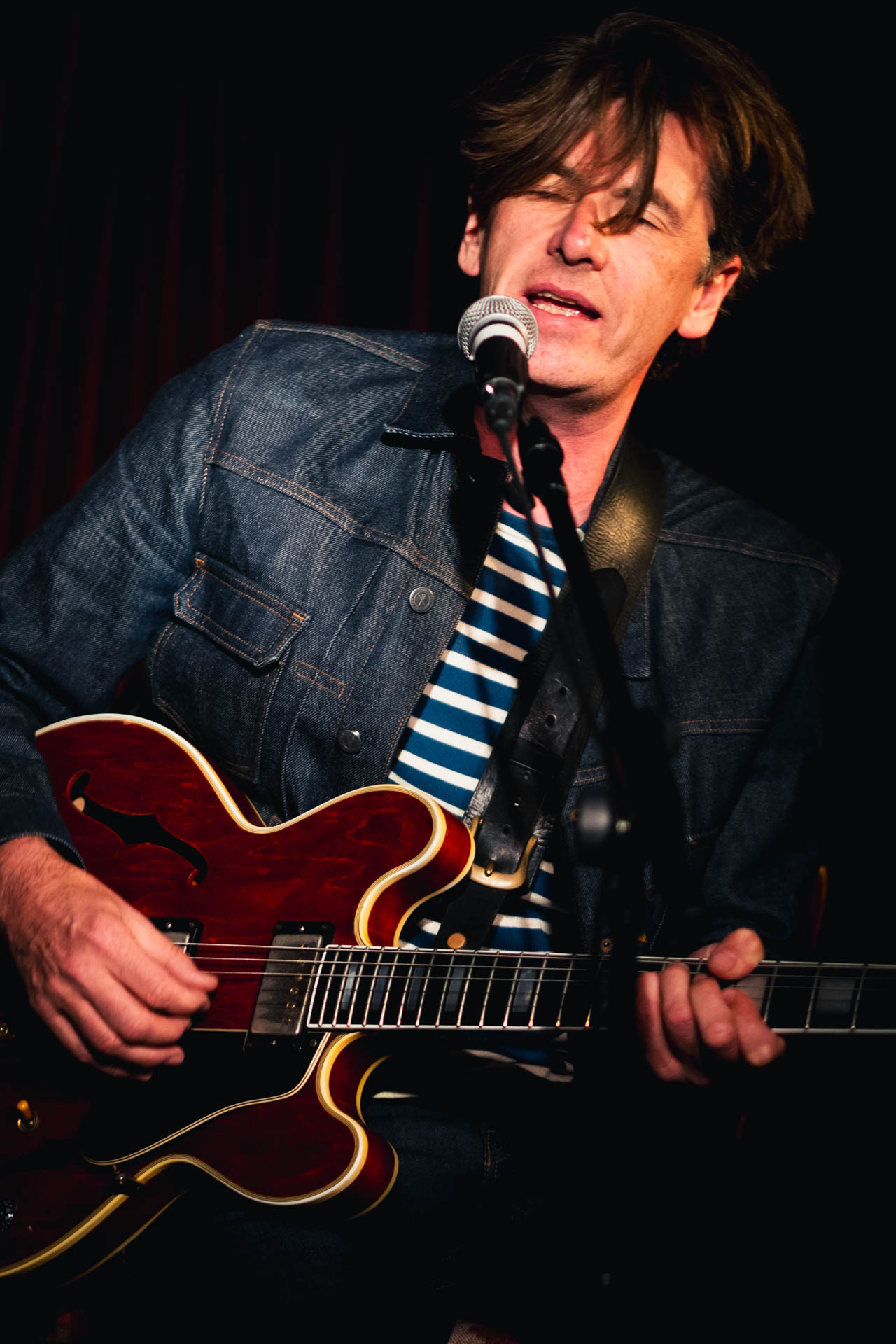
- Butler performing live in 2023

Background information
- Born: Bernard Joseph Butler; 1 May 1970 (age 56); Stamford Hill, London, England
- Genres: Alternative rock; Britpop; glam rock; folk music
- Occupations: Singer; songwriter; guitarist; record producer
- Instruments: Guitar; vocals; bass; keyboards; violin
- Years active: 1989–present
- Member of: McAlmont & Butler
- Formerly of: Suede; The Tears

Bernard Joseph Butler (born 1 May 1970) is an English musician, songwriter and record producer. He is best known for being the guitarist for the band Suede from 1989 to 1994, appearing on the albums Suede (1993) and Dog Man Star (1994). He would leave the band midway through the recording of the latter.

Butler has been hailed by some critics as the greatest guitarist of his generation; BBC journalist Mark Savage called him "one of Britain's most original and influential guitarists". He was voted the 24th greatest guitarist of the last 30 years in a national 2010 BBC poll and is often seen performing with a 1961 cherry red Gibson ES-355 TD SV (Stereo Varitone) with a Bigsby vibrato tailpiece.

== Early life ==
Butler was born to Irish parents in North London on 1 May 1970. He spent his summers in his parents' hometown of Dún Laoghaire and in an interview given in 2022, he reflected on his upbringing and Irish immigration to Britain.

I don't know if it's the case now much, but definitely up to the generation where I was from. Just because of the migration in the sixties, I guess. That was the big thing in the '60s, and we all ended up in Manchester, Liverpool or North London. Places wherever the trains came into: Holyhead. Growing up, pretty much everyone I knew was Irish.

The youngest of three boys, Butler credits his oldest brother with inspiring his interest in music. The first vinyl record he bought was The Smiths' Hand in Glove, having become a fan of the band after hearing John Peel play Reel Around the Fountain on his BBC radio show. When he was eight, Butler started learning to play the violin, something which he later recalled he "used to get beaten up and spat at on the bus for." His introduction to the guitar came after his brothers lost interest in a "terrible electric guitar". Butler used it to play along with Johnny Marr's guitar parts to The Smiths' songs, eventually learning each one note-by-note and becoming proficient without ever having a formal guitar lesson.

Bernard studied history at Queen Mary University of London before dropping out at age 19.

== Career ==
=== Suede (1989–1994) ===
He first achieved fame in 1992 as the guitarist with Suede, forging a songwriting partnership with Brett Anderson. He co-wrote and played guitars or piano on every recording until 1994, when he exited Suede.

=== McAlmont & Butler (1994–1995, 2002–2004, 2006, 2014–present) ===
Immediately after leaving Suede, he formed the duo McAlmont & Butler with David McAlmont. They released two singles, "Yes" and "You Do". A compilation album, The Sound Of... McAlmont & Butler, was released after the collaboration ended.

=== Solo (1998-1999, 2024) ===
Butler then released two solo albums under his own name, People Move On and Friends and Lovers, on Creation Records, yielding the hit single "Stay". In March 2024, Butler announced his third solo album, Good Grief, released in May 2024 on his own 355 Recordings label. He toured throughout 2024.

=== The Tears (2004–2006) ===
In 2004, Butler formed a new band with Anderson, The Tears, based on the same style that yielded their first successes with Suede in the early 1990s. The Tears released their debut LP, Here Come the Tears, produced by Butler, in June 2005. Singles include "Refugees", which reached number 9 in the UK Singles Chart, and "Lovers".

=== Collaborations and production work ===
Butler has played on and/or produced records by Aimee Mann, Edwyn Collins, Neneh Cherry, Tim Booth (of James), Eddi Reader, Hopper, Roy Orbison, Bert Jansch, The Libertines, Heather Nova, Mark Owen, The Veils, Sophie Ellis-Bextor, The Cribs, The Pretenders, The On-Off's, 1990s, The Mescalitas, Cut Off Your Hands, Cajun Dance Party, Duffy, The View, Arkitekt, Sons and Daughters, Black Kids, Tricky, Sharleen Spiteri, Nerina Pallot, Natalie McCool and Pet Shop Boys.

In 2001, Butler teamed up with McAlmont for a second McAlmont & Butler album, Bring it Back, and they toured the UK after the release of two singles, "Falling" and "Bring It Back".

In 2005, he was introduced to Welsh singer Duffy and contributed to her top-selling debut album Rockferry—it was the best selling album of 2008 in the UK—which won the Best Pop Vocal Album Grammy Award in 2008.

In 2009, Butler co-wrote/produced/played on tracks by The Veils, Tommy Reilly, Jonathan Jeremiah, Kate Jackson and Catherine A.D. (Catherine Anne Davies, who now performs as The Anchoress). He also commenced production work on Kate Nash's second album, My Best Friend Is You, in mid-2009.

In 2010, Butler worked with Nerina Pallot, Fyfe Dangerfield, Noisettes, Slow Club, Gabrielle, Howling Bells, The Veils, Simon Dine, and new artists Jodie Marie, Vince, Daley, Summer Camp, Joe Worricker and Scott McFarnon.

Over the 2011–2012 period, Butler produced albums for Frankie & The Heartstrings and continued working with Daley on his forthcoming Days & Nights album, the title track of which was co-written and produced by Butler. He also co-wrote and produced Texas's comeback album, The Conversation. Butler worked at Studio 355 for these recordings.

In 2013, Butler worked with the group Teleman to finish their debut album; worked on songs with London group Flowers; and collaborated with Paloma Faith and Fyfe Dangerfield. In June 2013, he formed an impromptu improvisational performance at the Sunderland record store run by Frankie & The Heartstrings. Alongside members of Warm Digits, Field Music and 1990s, the impromptu group played a completely unrehearsed and improvised set.

In August 2013, Butler played two shows at The Slaughtered Lamb in London, UK, accompanying Ben Watt on electric guitar, resulting in a touring and recording collaboration spanning two albums and several years of live shows across the globe.

In October 2013, new group Trans released the red EP, the first in a series of EPs for Rough Trade Records. Featuring tracks grown out of improvisational sessions that date back over a year, with Jackie McKeown, Paul Borchers and Igor Volk, the recordings were made at Studio 355. All sessions were improvised, recorded in their entirety, and later edited with very few overdubs.

In May 2014, Butler organised two special McAlmont & Butler performances to raise funds for the Bobath Centre's work with children with cerebral palsy. The London shows at the Union Chapel and Islington Assembly Hall sold out, and the duo were accompanied by a full band that consisted of members of The Magic Numbers, Mako Sakamoto on drums and Sean Read on keyboards.

In 2017, Butler produced the self-titled debut album of the New York band QTY. In November 2019, Pet Shop Boys released their second single "Burning the Heather" from their forthcoming album Hotspot, featuring acoustic guitar played by Butler. Folk artist Sam Lee collaborated with Butler in 2019, resulting in his Old Wow album and selected live shows that followed. Butler joined Lee's curated Earth Day live stream in May 2020, improvising remotely along to a live stream of nightingales singing in the Sussex forest. This was followed by the release of tracks from Roxanne De Bastion.

In 2020, writer Peter Paphides' label Needle Mythology finally released the open collaboration with Catherine Anne Davies. The album, In Memory of My Feelings, compiled 10 songs drawn from the writing sessions begun in 2009, which Butler then pieced together and completed. Artwork was created in collaboration with artist Eva Vermandel.

During 2021, Butler worked on a new Altered Images album with 1980s band members Clare Grogan and Stephen Lironi. According to Grogan, who announced the release in December 2021, the album would be released in August 2022, on Cooking Vinyl records, with the name Mascara Streakz.

On 15 April 2022, Butler and Irish actress Jessie Buckley released "The Eagle & The Dove", the lead single from their collaborative album For All Our Days That Tear the Heart. The album was released on 17 June that year to widespread acclaim and resulted in a nomination for the prestigious Mercury Prize.

In 2023, Butler completed Sam Lee's Songdreaming album and the debut from Irish band The Clockworks, "Exit Strategy".

Alongside songwriters Norman Blake and James Grant, a collaboration formed for the 2022 Celtic Connections, and the three continued to tour and later began work on a debut record as a trio. In March 2025, the trio released the album Butler, Blake & Grant on 355 Recordings. The following January, the trio announced their second collaborative album, Murmurs, set for release on 27 March 2026 by 355.

=== Music in film and television ===
Butler created the soundtrack to the 1997 film The James Gang and played on the soundtrack of Velvet Goldmine, and in 2020 created the score to a BBC Horizon episode on Pluto TV.

=== Radio host ===
Since 2017, Butler has hosted the radio show BB & The King. Broadcast live from North London via Boogaloo Radio each Friday, Bernard Butler and partner Mark Kingston bring two hours of music and conversation around an episodic theme. Each week is archived via a Mixcloud page.

=== Music education ===
Butler collaborated in songwriting camps and sessions for Warner Chappell. He conducts audience-led preproduction events around the country for the Musicians’ Union. Butler is also a resident lead Lecturer teaching the songwriting BA degree course at BIMM University, London.

== Personal life ==
On 13 April 2014, Butler participated in the London Marathon to raise funds for children with cerebral palsy.

Butler is a patron of the Bert Jansch Foundation. Set up in 2013, in the name of the folk-guitarist and singer-songwriter, the foundation embraces the heritage of acoustic folk music and celebrates its creativity. Its charitable aims are to support young acoustic musicians with educational and early career opportunities.

Butler is also a patron of the Music Venue Trust, a registered UK charity that acts to protect, secure and improve UK grassroots music venues for the benefit of communities and upcoming artists.

== Awards ==
Butler won the Producer of the Year award at the 2009 BRIT Awards and 2008 Music Managers Forum Awards, was nominated for Best Producer at the 2009 Music Week Awards, and received a Grammy Award for work on Duffy's Rockferry which won the Best Pop Vocal Album award for 2009. His collaborative album with Jessie Buckley, For All Our Days That Tear The Heart, was nominated as one of the Albums Of The Year by the Mercury Prize 2022.

== Discography ==
=== Suede ===
- 1993 – Suede – Suede (No. 1 UK) (Mercury Music Prize winner)
  - singles: "The Drowners" (No. 49 UK), "Metal Mickey" (No. 17 UK), "Animal Nitrate" (No. 7 UK), "So Young" (No. 22 UK)
- 1994 – Suede – "Stay Together" (No. 3 UK) (Non-album single)
- 1994 – Suede – Dog Man Star (No. 3 UK)
  - singles: "We are the Pigs" (No. 18 UK), "The Wild Ones" (No. 18 UK), "New Generation" (No. 21 UK)
- 1997 – Suede – Sci-Fi Lullabies (No. 9 UK)
  - (first eleven tracks on a collection of B-sides)
- 2003 – Suede – Singles (No. 31 UK)
  - (eight tracks on a collection of Greatest Hits)

=== Solo ===
- 1998 – Bernard Butler – People Move On (No. 11 UK)
  - Singles: "Stay" (No. 12 UK), "Not Alone" (No. 27 UK), "A Change of Heart" (No. 45 UK)
- 1999 – Bernard Butler – Friends and Lovers (No. 43 UK)
  - Singles: "Friends and Lovers", "You Must Go On" (No. 44 UK), "I'd Do It Again If I Could"
- 2024 – Bernard Butler – Good Grief (No. 40 UK)
  - Singles: 'Camber Sands', 'Deep Emotions', 'Pretty D'

=== McAlmont & Butler ===
- 1995 – McAlmont & Butler – The Sound Of... McAlmont & Butler (No. 33 UK)
  - singles: "Yes" (No. 8 UK), "You Do" (No. 17 UK)
- 2002 – McAlmont & Butler – Bring It Back (No. 18 UK)
  - singles: "Falling" (No. 23 UK), "Bring it Back" (No. 36 UK)
- 2006 – McAlmont & Butler
  - single: "Speed" (No. 193 UK)

=== Bernard Butler & Edwyn Collins ===
  - 2002 - Single: "Message for Jojo" (No. 113 UK)

=== The Tears ===
- 2005 – The Tears – Here Come The Tears (No. 15 UK)
  - singles: "Refugees" (No. 9 UK), "Lovers" (No. 24 UK)

=== Trans ===
- 2013 – Red EP
- 2014 – Green EP

=== Catherine Anne Davies & Bernard Butler ===
- 2020 – In Memory of My Feelings

=== Jessie Buckley & Bernard Butler ===
- 2022 - 'For All Our Days That Tear the Heart' (No. 23 UK)
  - Singles: "The Eagle & the Dove", "Seven Red Rose Tattoos", "For All Our Days That Tear the Heart", "Footnotes On the Map"

=== Bernard Butler, Norman Blake & James Grant ===
- 2025 - Butler, Blake & Grant
- 2026 - Murmurs

=== Collaborator/producer ===
- Manic Street Preachers – The Drowners and Stay with Me (1994) Live recordings appeared as B-sides to the Manics' She Is Suffering
- Aimee Mann – I'm With Stupid (1995)
- Neneh Cherry – Man (1996)
- Booth and the Bad Angel – Booth and the Bad Angel (1996)
- Hopper – English And French (1996)
- Bert Jansch – Crimson Moon (2000) and Edge of a Dream (2002)
- Heather Nova – South (2001)
- Bernard & Edwyn – "Message For Jojo" (2001)
- The Libertines – "What a Waster" (2002), "Don't Look Back into the Sun" (2003)
- Mark Owen – "Four Minute Warning" (2003), co-wrote b-side "Jay Walker"
- Sophie Ellis-Bextor – Shoot from the Hip (2003)
- The Veils – The Runaway Found (2003), Sun Gangs (2009)
- The Cribs – "You're Gonna Lose Us" (2005)
- 1990s – Cookies (2007), Kicks (2009)
- Sharleen Spiteri – Melody (2008)
- Sons And Daughters – This Gift (2008)
- Cajun Dance Party – The Colourful Life (2008)
- Duffy – Rockferry (2008)
- Black Kids – Partie Traumatic (2008)
- Tricky – Knowle West Boy (2008)
- Duke Special – I Never Thought This Day Would Come (2008)
- Cut Off Your Hands – You And I (2008)
- Findlay Brown – Love Will Find You (2009)
- Tommy Reilly – Words on the Floor (2009)
- Fyfe Dangerfield – "Faster Than the Setting Sun" and "She Needs Me", Fly Yellow Moon (2010)
- Kate Nash – My Best Friend Is You (2010)
- Nerina Pallot – Year of the Wolf (2011)
- James Morrison – The Awakening (2011)
- Richard Walters – Pacing (2011)
- Natalie McCool – Thin Air (2012)
- Texas – The Conversation (2013)
- Teleman – Cristina (2013)
- Frankie & The Heartstrings – The Days Run Away (2013)
- Teleman – Steam Train Girl (2013)
- Trans – Red EP (2013)
- Daley – Days & Nights (2014)
- Trans – Green EP (2014)
- Ben Watt – Hendra (2014), Fever Dream (2016)
- Teleman – "Breakfast" (2014)
- Flowers – "Do What You Want To, It's What You Should Do" (2014)
- The Rails – "Habit" (2014)
- Paloma Faith – "Beauty Remains" (2014)
- Shaun Keaveny – "Please Don't Get Me Anything for Christmas" (2015)
- Kate Jackson – British Road Movies (2016)
- The Tyde – "The Curse In Reverse" (2016)
- QTY – "Rodeo" (2016)
- Mark Eitzel – Hey Mr Ferryman (2017)
- QTY – "QTY" (2017)
- Mull Historical Society – Wakelines (2018)
- Pet Shop Boys – "Burning the Heather" (2020)
