= Here Come the Tears =

Studio album by The Tears
- Released: 6 June 2005
- Recorded: June–October 2004
- Studios: RAK; 2KHz; Alsatian Nation; West Heath Yard; Miloco; Angel
- Genre: Pop
- Length: 52:52
- Label: Independiente
- Producer: Bernard Butler

Singles from Here Come the Tears
- 1. "Refugees" Released: 25 April 2005; 2. "Lovers" Released: 27 June 2005; 3. "Autograph" Released: 24 October 2005

Here Come the Tears is the only studio album by English rock band the Tears. It was released on 6 June 2005 on Independiente. Frontman Brett Anderson and guitarist Bernard Butler had found success together earlier in Suede, with Butler leaving that band after just two albums. Suede's career was on pause when the two reunited for this project. In January 2004, the pair had begun recording music together in secrecy; they decided to form the Tears with bassist Nathan Fisher, drummer Makoto Sakamoto and keyboardist Will Foster. The band had accumulated 18 demos by June 2004, after which, they started recording the album. Sessions were held across various studios with Butler as the producer and finished by October 2004. Here Come the Tears is a pop album that evokes the work of David Bowie, and was compared to Suede's second studio album Dog Man Star (1994).

Here Come the Tears received generally favourable reviews from critics, many of whom highlight the Dog Man Star comparison; some praised Anderson's lyrics, while others thought they were inferior to his lyrics with Suede. The album reached number 15 in the UK Albums Chart as the singles, "Refugees" and "Lovers" peaked at numbers nine and 24, respectively. The Tears began performing publicly in December 2004, which was followed by the album's lead single "Refugees" in April 2005. They went on a tour of the UK leading up to the album's release, which was promoted with the second single "Lovers" in June 2005. The band performed at the T in the Park and Reading and Leeds Festivals, prior to a tour of mainland Europe. "Autograph" was released as the album's third and final single in October 2005.

== Background and recording ==
Vocalist Brett Anderson and guitarist Bernard Butler were previously members of the band Suede, who rose to prominence during the 1990s. Partway through the making of their second studio album Dog Man Star (1994), Butler left; he was replaced by Richard Oakes. Butler continued as a session musician, playing with the likes of Aimee Mann and Tim Booth of James, and formed the project McAlmont & Butler with David McAlmont for The Sound Of... McAlmont & Butler (1995). Butler went on to release two solo albums, People Move On (1998) and Friends and Lovers for Creation Records, which had folded by 2000. He reunited with McAlmont for Bring It Back (2002).

While this was occurring, Suede continued releasing albums through to A New Morning (2002); it was unsuccessful commercially, with the band taking an indefinite hiatus by the end of 2003. A few days after Suede's final show in December 2003, Butler was contacted by Anderson, marking the first time the pair spoke in nine years. In January 2004, it was reported that Anderson and Butler had recorded music together. Anderson would visit Butler at his house to write new material. The pair decided to form the Tears, which also featured bassist Nathan Fisher, drummer Makoto Sakamoto and keyboardist Will Foster. By June 2004, the band made demos of 18 songs for possible inclusion on their upcoming debut album.

Butler produced the sessions with Anderson acting as the executive producer; recording was held at RAK Studios, 2KHz, Alsatian Nation, West Heath Yard and Miloco Studios. Butler and Nick Terry served as engineers at Alsatian Nation, while Sebastian Lewsley did the same at West Heath Yard. They were assisted by Helen Atkinson and Richard Woodcraft at RAK, Adrian Breakspear at 2KHz, Joe Hirst and Jimmy Robertson at Miloco, and Jackson Gold at West Heath Yard. Steve Price recorded the orchestra at Angel Studios. Recording wrapped up in October 2004. All of the songs, bar "The Asylum", were mixed at The Strongroom with assistance from Tom Paterson; "The Asylum" was mixed at Miloco.

== Composition and lyrics ==
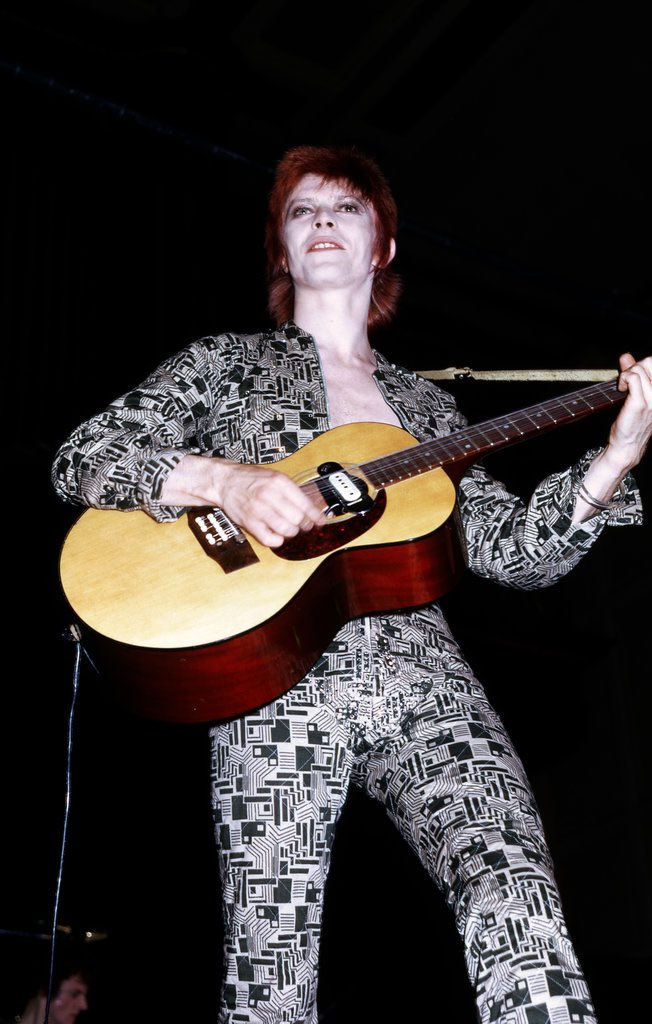
David Bowie, specifically his albums The Man Who Sold the World (1970) and Hunky Dory (1971), served as an influence on the sound of Here Come the Tears.

Here Come the Tears is a pop album, which takes influence from the work of David Bowie, namely his albums The Man Who Sold the World (1970) and Hunky Dory (1971). Music critic Stephen Thomas Erlewine said it fell "between the incessantly catchy pop that wound up on Coming Up and the sighing romanticism and larger-than-life sweep of Dog Man Star". Dom Gourlay of Drowned in Sound wrote that the band were an "amalgam[ation] of Butler's prosthetic paean to prog-rock 'The Asphalt World' [from Dog Man Star] and an extension to what his 'Friends And Lovers' solo project may have sounded like with snappier couplets and more concise observations". RTÉ's Katie Moten said Here Come the Tears lacks any kind of substantial tempo changes, bar "A Love as Strong as Death", compared to Dog Man Star, which "boasted a host of varying beats and rhythms". Another comparison to Dog Man Star was made by Joe Tangari from Pitchfork, with him singling out the "wandering, Leslie'd pianos and smearing, slightly antagonistic string arrangements". Anderson's lyrics touch on the topics of being disconnected, misfits, regret, tragic love, yearning, loners and the feeling of being alienated. He said he was "slightly over-deliberately not writing about the kinds of things I was writing about in early Suede" material.

Anderson and Butler wrote the album's opening track "Refugees" as a reaction to how refugees are treated amongst the public and with immigration policies. Anderson said it began as a "song of identification with the hoards of refugees who were flooding London" a few years prior. It evokes some of the more up-tempo, glam pop songs from Suede's catalogue, namely from their 1993 debut self-titled album, as well as later tracks such as "Trash" (1996) and "...Morning" (2002). For "Autograph", Anderson recounts his regrets about being intimate with groupies over the years. The song's harmonica part recalled the one heard in "Hand in Glove" (1983) by the Smiths. The ballad "Co-Star" is followed by "Imperfection", which continues the theme of Suede's "Obsessions" (2002), that has Anderson describe his partner's flaws, done in tribute to Sonnet 130 by William Shakespeare. "The Ghost of You" deals with the subject of death, namely of Anderson's mother.

"Two Creatures" tackles the state of the world in the style of the Beautiful South and running away to Africa; "Lovers" comes across as a remake of "Trash", and recalls the work of Dodgy. "Fallen Idols" is about self-doubt, backed by Butler's Beatlesque guitar work that evokes Suede's "Stay Together (1994)". During a live performance, Anderson claimed "Fallen Idols" was about the life of the Who guitarist Pete Townshend. With "Brave New Century", Anderson said he wished to "humanise the immigrant communities", while also criticizing celebrity worship, which had become "more extreme and bizarre". Butler's guitars in it echo the sound of Led Zeppelin. "Beautiful Pain" uses drugs as a metaphor for a lover, in the vein of "There She Goes" (1988) by the La's, and discusses going cold turkey. Anderson wrote "The Asylum" about his father; Playlouder's David Barnett said it was "almost frightening in its frankness" as Anderson "more or less admits that he's bound for the loony bin". "Apollo 13" is a blues power ballad about a destructive relationship. The album's closing song "A Love as Strong as Death" uses weather to convey emotions, and is reminiscent of the Dog Man Star closer "Still Life".

== Release and promotion ==
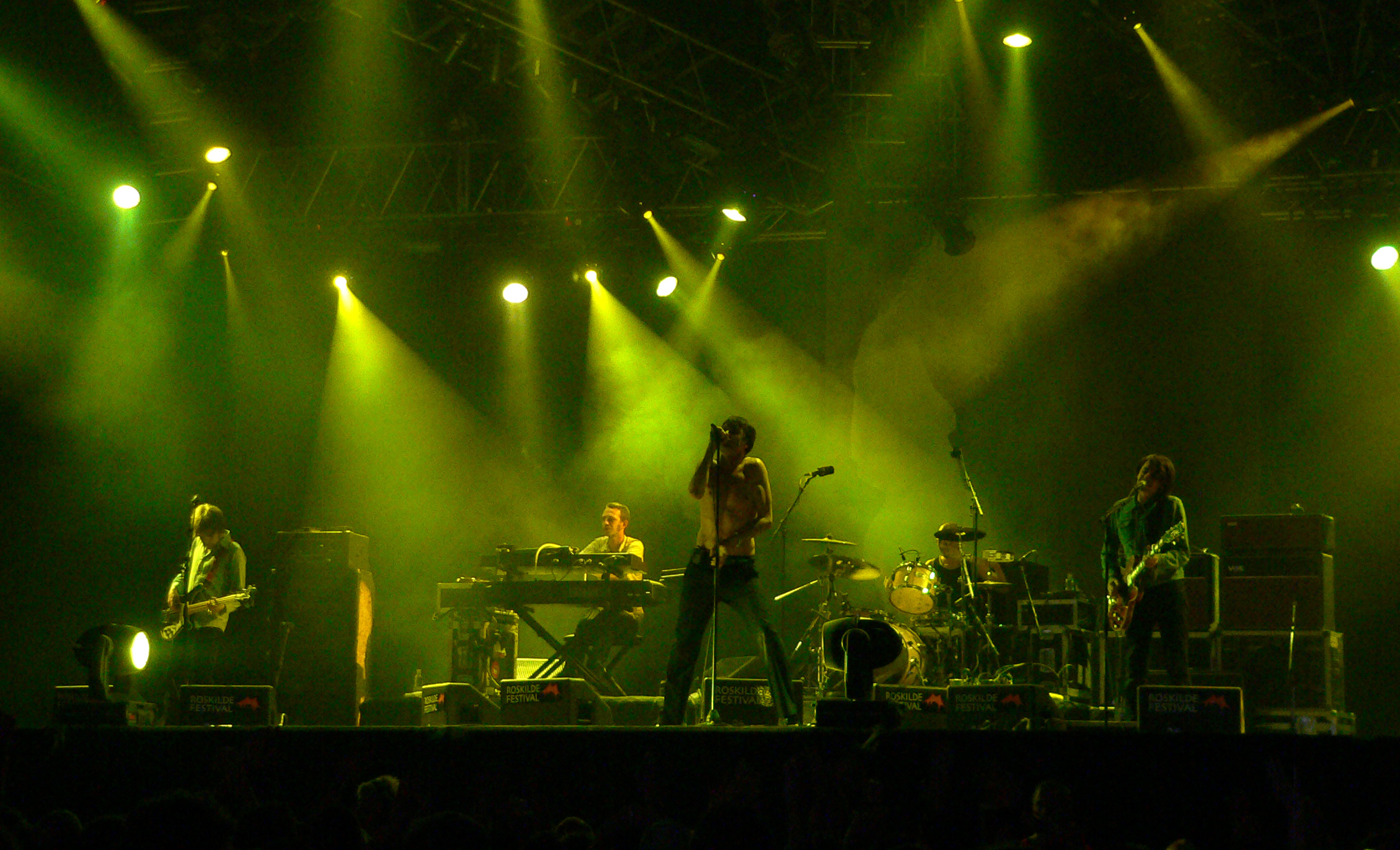
The Tears toured throughout 2005 for Here Come the Tears.

In October 2004, the Tears were formally announced to the public. In December 2004, the band made their live debut, marking the first time Anderson and Butler had played a show together in ten years. In February 2005, they played three shows, one of which was at the London Astoria as part of the NME Awards, where they were supported by Nine Black Alps, the Dead 60s and the Magic Numbers. On 3 March 2005, Here Come the Tears was announced for release later that year. "Refugees" was originally planned to be released as the album's lead single on 18 April 2005, before it was delayed to 25 April 2005; the 7-inch vinyl version included "Break Away". Two versions were released on CD: the first with "Southern Rain", while the second featured "Feels Like Monday", "Branded" and the music video for "Refugees". To promote it, the Tears embarked on a tour of the UK intertwined with a few in-store performances and signing events. During the Sheffield date of the trek, the band performed the Suede song "The Living Dead". The following month, they played one-off shows in London and Belfast.

Here Come the Tears was originally planned for release in May 2005, before it was delayed to 6 June 2005. The album's artwork is an image called "Guests 1998" by Christopher Bucklow. The Japanese edition, which was released by V2 Records, featured "Southern Rain" and "Song for the Migrant Worker" as bonus tracks. To help promote it, Anderson went on a promotional press tour across mainland Europe, and the band appeared at that year's Glastonbury and Oxegen festivals. "Lovers" was released as the album's second single three days later; the 7-inch vinyl version included "Because You're Worthless". Two versions were released on CD: the first with "Song for the Migrant Worker", while the second featured "Low-Life", "The Primitive" and the music video for "Lovers". Following this, the Tears performed at the T in the Park and Reading and Leeds Festivals, before undertaking a tour of mainland Europe. The band played a one-off show in London in October 2005, which had been rescheduled from August 2005 after a death in one of the members' families. Around this, "Autograph" was released as the album's third and final single on 24 October 2005.

== Reception ==
Professional ratings
Aggregate scores
Source	Rating
Metacritic	74/100
Review scores
Source	Rating
AllMusic	4.5/5 stars
The Guardian	3/5 stars
The Independent	4.5/5 stars
The Irish Times	4/5 stars
Mojo	3/5 stars
NME	8/10
Pitchfork	7/10
The Scotsman	3/5 stars
Spin	B
Stylus Magazine	B

Here Come the Tears proved a successful comeback for Butler and Anderson as it was praised by critics. At Metacritic, which assigns a normalized rating out of 100 to reviews from mainstream critics, the album has an average score of 74 out of 100, which indicates "generally favourable reviews" based on 17 reviews.

Some reviewers felt that Here Come the Tears sounded like later Suede material, while others found it to be more in line with Dog Man Star. Erlewine noted that, the album is "what Coming Up would have been if Butler had stuck around"; The Irish Times writer Brian Boyd said that if "this had been the follow-up to Dog Man Star, things might have been very different". Dave Simpson of The Guardian said it was not far removed from the albums Suede created without Butler's involvement. Hot Press writer Shilpa Ganatra said the Tears "shouldn’t be compared to Suede. They waived that right, however, when they managed to make Here Come The Tears sound exactly like Dog Man Star". Moten said the Tears "borrow a lot from that earlier partnership", with the album coming across as "far inferior to Suede's classic collection, 'Dog Man Star'". She added that the listener "ultimately come[s] away thinking Butler and Anderson haven't done anything as The Tears that they didn't do better as Suede". BBC Music's Jamie Gill at the album's best it was as "fearless and ambitious as Suede's masterpiece Dog Man Star".

The staff at Entertainment.ie said Anderson counted Butler's "epic guitar lines" by "writing his most vivid and stirring songs for over a decade". Olga Bas of This Is Fake DIY said the album's first half had a "marked lack of truly impressionable lyrics. Not to say that happy songs cannot have good wordplay," though some lines "cannot help but inspire laughter at the silliness of it all". She was more complimentary for the second half, describing it as "much more somber and melancholy". musicOMH writer John Murphy saw an improvement with Anderson's lyrics, as he's "moved onto more substantial topics". Barnett, however, said that anyone "expecting the much-tromboned Anderson-Butler reunion to bring about a massive renaissance in Brett's lyrical prowess is going to be disappointed". Yahoo! Music reviewer Sharon O'Connell said that Anderson was "still penning lyrics about cigarettes, coffee, mascara and magazines, like he's just beamed in from the Bronze Age", an observation that Tangari and Andy Gill of The Independent also made.

Pete Cashmore of NME called Here Come the Tears the "best album you'll hear this year, by a mile", stating that its only flaw is that it is an "embarrassment of riches, a grande bouffe of drama, beauty and romance". The staff at Spin wrote "if this reunion [...] isn't a revelation, it still has its thrills, mostly via Butler's lush, breath taking backdrops". Barnet said that apart from the "handful of duff tracks and a couple of absolute howlers, 'Here Come The Tears' is a fine album - certainly not the best they've made together, nor even apart, but accomplished, ambitious and often highly impressive". Yallon Banoun of God Is in the TV wrote that overall, he thought it was "definitely a great comeback album. Only a few songs here recall the early Suede style, 'The tears' have managed to create their own distinctive sound, which is more 'Soul' inspired than Suede ever where". O'Connell said that Anderson and Butler "have basically remodelled themselves for a more sensible and sober Suede fan base". Stylus Magazine reviewer Mike Mineo wrote that the duo had "not lost a bit of the touch that made them famous in the early 1990s—this debut will surely prove to be one of the most consistent albums of the year".

Other reviews, however were more mixed, such as Uncut, who wrote that Here Come the Tears is "not a disaster, by any means.... It's just that, over 13 songs, it's abundantly clear that whatever the potency of this partnership, there's an old lack of range". Molen said that while the songs were "interesting enough," after a while, "they start to blend into each other [...] and the repetition is what affects you most". LAS Magazine writer Niles Baranowski wrote that it "sounds confident and brash but breaks little new ground", added that "[j]ust as on the first two Suede records, Butler's noisy, glittery guitar tone is a secret weapon". While it "fits nicely in Anderson and Butler's catalogs [...] it makes matters clear that all they'll ever do is release clones of what they once were".

Here Come the Tears charted at number 15 on the UK Albums Chart. "Refugees" peaked at number nine, while "Lovers" peaked at number 24. Andrew Womack, of online magazine The Morning News placed the album at number 8 in its list of the top 10 albums of 2005.

== Track listing ==
All songs written by Brett Anderson and Bernard Butler.

1. "Refugees" – 2:51
2. "Autograph" – 3:31
3. "Co-star" – 4:01
4. "Imperfection" – 4:42
5. "The Ghost of You" – 4:57
6. "Two Creatures" – 3:57
7. "Lovers" – 4:03
8. "Fallen Idol" – 3:39
9. "Brave New Century" – 3:44
10. "Beautiful Pain" – 3:46
11. "The Asylum" – 3:53
12. "Apollo 13" – 5:34
13. "A Love as Strong as Death" – 4:14

== Personnel ==
Personnel per booklet.

The Tears

- Brett Anderson – vocals
- Bernard Butler – electric guitar, string arranger
- Nathan Fisher – bass
- Makoto Sakamoto – drums
- Will Foster – keyboards

Additional musicians

- Sally Herbert – string arranger, conductor, strings
- Gini Ball – strings
- Dinah Beamish – strings
- Catherine Browning – strings
- Ian Burdge – strings
- Gillon Cameron – strings
- Calina De La Mare – strings
- Howard Gott – strings
- Steve Hussey – strings
- Jackie Norrie – strings
- Julia Singleton – strings
- Anne Stephenson – strings
- Lucy Wilkins – strings
- Chris Worsey – strings
- Brian Wright – strings
- Skaila Kanga – harp
- Matthew Gunner – French horn
- Roland Sutherland – flute

Production and design

- Bernard Butler – producer, engineer
- Brett Anderson – executive producer, design
- Nick Terry – engineer
- Sebastian Lewsley – engineer
- Helen Atkinson – assistant
- Richard Woodcraft – assistant
- Adrian Breakspear – assistant
- Tom Paterson – assistant
- Joe Hirst – assistant
- Jimmy Robertson – assistant
- Jackson Gold – assistant
- Steve Price – orchestra recording
- Christopher Bucklow – cover image
- Richard Bull – design, art direction
- Hamish Brown – portrait photography

== Charts ==
Chart performance for Here Come the Tears
Chart (2005)	Peak position
UK Albums (Official Charts)	15
