= Bucklow =

Bucklow may refer to:

- Bucklow (hundred), formerly a division of Cheshire, England
- Bucklow Hill, a village in Cheshire, England
- Bucklow Rural District, formerly a local government district in Cheshire
- Bucklow (UK Parliament constituency), formerly a constituency in Cheshire
- Bucklow (ward), a former electoral ward of Trafford, Greater Manchester (1973–2004)
- Bucklow-St. Martins, an electoral ward of Trafford, Greater Manchester
- Christopher Bucklow (born 1957), British photographer and painter
