= The Days Run Away =

Studio album by Frankie & The Heartstrings
- Released: 4 June 2013
- Genre: Indie rock
- Length: 33:46
- Label: Wichita
- Producer: Bernard Butler

Frankie & The Heartstrings chronology
Hunger (2011)	The Days Run Away (2013)

Singles from The Days Run Away
- 1. "Nothing Our Way" Released: May 21, 2013

Professional ratings
Aggregate scores
Source	Rating
Metacritic	71/100
Review scores
Source	Rating
AllMusic	3.5/5 stars
Drowned in Sound	8/10
NME	7/10

The Days Run Away is the second studio album by indie rock band Frankie & The Heartstrings. It was released in June 2013 under Wichita Recordings.

== Track list ==
No.	Title	Length
1.	"I Still Follow You"	2:43
2.	"That Girl, That Scene"	2:26
3.	"Nothing Our Way"	3:24
4.	"Right Noises"	2:33
5.	"Losing a Friend"	4:42
6.	"She Will Say Goodbye"	3:40
7.	"Invitation"	2:04
8.	"The First Boy"	3:12
9.	"Everybody Looks Better (In the Right Light)"	2:24
10.	"Scratches"	3:27
11.	"Light That Breaks"	3:11
