= Friends and Lovers (Bernard Butler album) =

Studio album by Bernard Butler
- Released: 25 October 1999
- Recorded: November 1998 – February 1999
- Studios: RAK and Konk, London; Chipping Norton Recording, Chipping Norton
- Genre: Pop rock
- Length: 50:13
- Label: Creation
- Producer: Bernard Butler

Bernard Butler chronology
People Move On (1998)	Friends and Lovers (1999)	In Memory of My Feelings (2020)

Singles from Friends and Lovers
- 1. "Friends & Lovers" Released: 13 August 1999; 2. "You Must Go On" Released: 11 October 1999; 3. "I'd Do It Again If I Could" Released: March 2000

Friends and Lovers is the second studio album by English singer-songwriter Bernard Butler, released on 25 October 1999 through Creation Records. He released his debut studio album, People Move On, in early 1998; within a few months, Butler had accumulated enough material for his next release. Recorded between November 1998 and February 1999, Butler produced the sessions at RAK Studios in London, before moving to Chipping Norton Recording Studios in Chipping Norton, Oxfordshire, and finishing at Konk Studios in London. Described as a pop rock release, Friends and Lovers had been compared to the works of Mott the Hoople, Small Faces and Spooky Tooth.

Friends and Lovers received generally favourable reviews from critics, several of whom considered it an improvement on People Move On. It peaked at number 43 in the United Kingdom, while only one of its singles charted, namely "You Must Go On" at number 44. "Friends & Lovers" was released as the lead single from the album on 13 August 1999, which was followed by some club shows. "You Must Go On" was released as the second single on 11 October 1999; that same month, Butler supported Texas on their UK tour. He had planned to embark on a headlining UK tour in early 2000, but had cancelled it when Alan McGee left Creation, and followed by the shutdown of the label. "I'd Do It Again If I Could" was released as the album's third single, exclusively in the United States. This albums is his last solo album for over two decades, until the release of 2024’s Good Grief.

== Background and recording ==
After stints with Suede and McAlmont & Butler in the early-to-mid 1990s, guitarist Bernard Butler spent a few years collaborating with other acts, such as Aimee Mann, Tim Booth of James, and Hopper. Following a week with the Verve, Butler decided to start a solo career. He signed to Creation Records, with whom he would release his debut studio album, People Move On, in April 1998. It peaked at number 11 in the United Kingdom, with all three of its singles charting, with first single "Stay" reaching the highest at number 12. Two months prior to the album's release, Butler said he had seven songs finished for its follow-up, with another 15 being works-in-progress. By September 1998, he had enough material ready for a new album; he had debuted some of the tracks the previous month while in the United States. In October 1998, Butler embarked on his first headlining tour of the UK.

Sessions for his next album took place between November 1998 and February 1999 with Butler acting as producer with engineer George Shilling. Recording initially began at RAK in London, though this was aborted, and then restarted at Chipping Norton Recording Studios in Chipping Norton at the suggestion of Shilling. Additional recording was done at Konk Studios, another London facility. Valerie Lambour, Albert Pinheiro, Ryan Tully, Boris Aldridge, and Chris Danby served as recording assistants across the various studios. Andy Wallace mixed the recordings at Soundtracks in New York City with assistant Steve Sisco, before the album was mastered by Howie Weinberg at Masterdisk, also in New York City.

== Composition and lyrics ==
Musically, the sound of Friends and Lovers moved away from the folky parts of People Move On, and leaned into the glam-influenced pop rock of Suede. It was compared to the works of Mott the Hoople, Small Faces and Spooky Tooth. Butler said the title deals with the "terms and changes in meaning in relationship boxes". He had the album's tracks written beforehand, which contrasted his debut, where most of the material for that was written in the studio. Butler said Friends and Lovers was more straight forward with its emotions, telling a "similar story in half as many ways" as People Move On. His backing band consisted of Chris Bowers of Hopper on bass, Makoto Sakamoto on drums, and Terry Miles of Denim on keyboards. A group of vocalists on the moniker the Terence Miles Trio provided background and harmony vocals across the recordings. In addition to this, Neil Halstead sung background vocals on "Has Your Mind Got Away?", Billy McGhee played upright bass on "Smile" and "Everyone I Know Is Falling Apart", Gonzo Lagonda contributed cello to "Cocoon" and "Smile", and Noel Thompson offered applause. David Simutis of Phoenix New Times said that the record is an upbeat affair. He wrote that "the main emotion captured on Friends & Lovers is happiness. From the up-tempo power chords, organ and handclaps of 'I'd Do It Again If I Could,' to the bouncing beat and guitar textures of 'What Happened to Me,' it's a powerful record of hope."

The album's opening track, "Friends & Lovers", is a funk-indebted song with Mellotron touches. It was demoed around the time Butler was writing material for his debut at Château de la Motte in Domfront, Normandy, France in 1996. "I'd Do It Again If I Could" is a keyboard-centred song, which is followed by the mid-tempo song "Cocoon". "Smile", as well as "Everyone I Know Is Falling Apart", has Butler displaying his ability as a vocalist. "You Must Go On", alongside "I'd Do It Again If I Could", is a guitar-focused track that come across as a British version of Phil Spector's sound. It sees Butler tackling grief, "dealing with things that happen in life. People die, you can't cry about it for the rest of your life". Two ballads followed, "No Easy Way Out" and "Everyone I Know Is Falling Apart"; the former was reminiscent of Goats Head Soup (1973)-era the Rolling Stones, while the latter evoked the darker songs on Third/Sister Lovers (1978). Wilson Neate of Consumable Online referred to "What Happened to Me" as a "bubblegum pop-rock thumper with more catchy harmonies". "Let's Go Away" deals with trying to protect a loved one from outside issues, which is followed by the ballad "Precious". The eight-minute psychedelic track "Has Your Mind Got Away?" was influenced by the work of Pink Floyd, and is followed by the album's closing ballad, "You'll Feel It When You're Mine".

== Release ==
In June 1999, Butler played at the Fuji Rock Festival in Japan, with a band consisting of Bowers, Sakamoto, and Miles. On 13 August 1999, Friends and Lovers was announced for release in two months' time. "Friends & Lovers" was released as the first single from it three days later, exclusively as a 10-inch vinyl single through his website. The following month, Butler played at Liss Ard 99 festival in Ireland, and then embarked on a brief UK club tour, leading up to a tribute show for Nick Drake. "You Must Go On" was released as the album's second single on 11 October 1999, with "Souvenir" and "Bare with Me" as the B-sides. Four days later, Butler performed the song on TFI Friday. Starting on 25 October 1999, the day Friends and Lovers was released, Butler did six consecutive signing events at Virgin Megastores across the UK over six days, followed-up by a live set at the company’s flagship store at Oxford Street in London on 2 November.

Also in October 1999, Butler supported Texas on their tour of the UK, which continued into the next month. Founder Alan McGee left Creation Records in December 1999, which caused Butler to cancel his January 2000 tour of the UK. Friends and Lovers had a delayed release on Columbia Records in the United States on 1 February 2000, after its initial scheduled date of 18 January 2000. The only US single release from the album, "I'd Do It Again If I Could", was released to modern rock radio in March 2000. That same month, Butler was left without a recording contract. When asked if he would sign with another label, he responded: "the idea of going in to a record company with tapes and stuff like that and saying ‘What do you think?’, and have some c— say it is shit doesn’t really appeal to me."

== Reception ==
Professional ratings
Review scores
Source	Rating
AllMusic	4/5 stars
The Guardian	3/5 stars
NME	6/10
The Phoenix	3.5/4 stars
Pittsburgh Post-Gazette	3/4 stars
PopMatters	6/10 discs
Q	3/5 stars
Sunday Herald	3/5 stars
The Times	3/5 stars
Wall of Sound	77/100

Friends and Lovers was met with generally favourable reviews from music critics. PopMatters editor Sarah Zupko called it "more anthemic and self-assured" than Butler's debut, as if he had "been steadily gaining confidence in himself as a frontman." Wall of Sound's Russell Hall concurred, stating that "[b]oth compositionally and in terms of execution, the new CD outshines its predecessor." CMJ New Music Report writer Chris Helm shared a similar sentiment, as the album "expounds upon the strengths of its predecessor by wisely cranking up the glammy crunch" of Butler's guitar. In a review for AllMusic, Stephen Thomas Erlewine felt that Butler has greater focus on this record, however felt that the music needed "a larger-than-life personality, a vocalist on the level of Brett Anderson." Ed Masley of the Pittsburgh Post-Gazette remarked: "With Anderson on vocals, this could be the strongest Suede release since Dog Man Star," and stated that: "Throughout, the hooks are irresistible."

Hot Press writer George Byrne complimented Butler on being "far more confident in his vocal abilities and more assured about his musical direction". Nude as the News co-founder Troy Carpenter echoed a similar statement, as Butler's "confident voice rings clear as it propels his melodies", accompanied by "lush instrumentation". Tim Murrah of Houston Press, on the other hand, noted that while Butler's "trademark wiggly playing is still intact," he showcased himself as a "weak writer and singer. At best, all of his songs are lukewarm". Chicago Tribune's Jay Hedblade had a similar mixed sentiment, saying Butler "demonstrates he's adept at building gorgeous mile-high melodies that hit all the right buttons, yet as agreeable as it is, there's still a nagging feeling that something's missing." He felt that Butler "spends too much time waxing poetic without the verbal dexterity to hold up the grand nature of the tunes." Michael Gallucci of Cleveland Scene said the album's "one consistent flaw" was Butler's "push to deliver it to its predestined place in the CD bins".

Friends and Lovers charted at number 43 on the UK Albums Chart. "You Must Go On" charted at number 44 on the UK Singles Chart.

== Track listing ==
All songs written and produced by Bernard Butler.

No.	Title	Length
1.	"Friends & Lovers"	4:13
2.	"I'd Do It Again If I Could"	3:26
3.	"Cocoon"	4:17
4.	"Smile"	4:02
5.	"You Must Go On"	3:25
6.	"No Easy Way Out"	4:26
7.	"Everyone I Know Is Falling Apart"	4:18
8.	"What Happened to Me"	3:18
9.	"Let's Go Away"	4:03
10.	"Precious"	3:54
11.	"Has Your Mind Got Away?"	8:12
12.	"You'll Feel It When You're Mine"	2:31

== Personnel ==
Personnel per booklet.

Musicians

- Bernard Butler – vocals, guitar
- Chris Bowers – bass
- Makoto Sakamoto – drums, percussion
- Terry Miles – keyboards
- The Terence Miles Trio – background vocals, harmony vocals
- Neil Halstead – background vocals (track 11)
- Billy McGhee – upright bass (tracks 4 and 7)
- Gonzo Lagonda – cello (tracks 3 and 4)
- Noel Thompson – applause

Production and design

- Bernard Butler – producer
- George Shilling – engineer
- Andy Wallace – mixing
- Howie Weinberg – mastering
- Valerie Lambour – recording assistant
- Albert Pinheiro – recording assistant
- Ryan Tully – recording assistant
- Boris Aldridge – recording assistant
- Chris Danby – recording assistant
- Steve Sisco – mix assistant
- Yacht Associates – design, art direction
- Jasper Goodall – illustrations

== Charts ==
Chart performance for Friends and Lovers
Chart (1999)	Peak position
UK Albums (Official Charts)	43

== See also ==
- Here Come the Tears – the sole album by the Tears, which featured Butler, and continued the sound of Suede
