= This Gift =

This Gift may refer to:

- This Gift (album), a 2008 album by Sons and Daughters, or the title song
- This Gift, a 1997 album by Gary Chapman,
- "This Gift" (song), a 1999 song by 98 Degrees
- "This Gift", song by Hardline from II, 2002
- "This Gift", song by Hassan Hakmoun from The Gift, 2002
- "This Gift", song by Mudhoney from Mudhoney, 1989

== See also ==
- Gift (disambiguation)
