= A Change of Heart (Bernard Butler song) =

Single by Bernard Butler

from the album People Move On
- Released: 15 June 1998
- Recorded: 1998
- Genre: Britpop
- Length: 4:41
- Label: Creation
- Songwriter(s): Bernard Butler
- Producer(s): Bernard Butler

Bernard Butler singles chronology
"Not Alone" (1998)	"A Change of Heart" (1998)	"Friends and Lovers" (1999)

"A Change of Heart" is the third single from Bernard Butler released in June 1998. It is the final single taken from the album People Move On and charted at number 45 on the UK Singles Chart.

The final single from People Move On had a lesser impact than previous singles, "Stay" and "Not Alone", at least in terms of radio airplay. "A Change of Heart" features another string arrangement courtesy of Billy McGee, who featured on previous single "Not Alone" and on "Yes", Butler's collaboration with David McAlmont. Ned Raggett of AllMusic wrote: "the pace of the track is gentler and sweeter throughout, feeling big without wanting to totally stomp down the doors. Sakamoto's drumming is quite fine, and the cinematic reach Butler favors still remains, offset by quieter moments with just piano and/or vocals."

The music video for the title song was directed by David Mould.

== Single track listings ==
1. "A Change of Heart"
2. "My Domain"
3. "More Than I Thought"
