= Not Alone (Bernard Butler song) =

Single by Bernard Butler

from the album People Move On
- Released: 16 March 1998
- Recorded: 1998
- Genre: Britpop
- Length: 3:51
- Label: Creation
- Songwriter: Bernard Butler
- Producer: Bernard Butler

Bernard Butler singles chronology
"Stay" (1998)	"Not Alone" (1998)	"A Change of Heart" (1998)

"Not Alone" is the second single from Bernard Butler released in March 1998. It was taken from the album People Move On and charted at number 27 on the UK Singles Chart.

The song is an upbeat pop song with a string arrangement similar to his hit single "Yes" with David McAlmont. The song was well-received by critics. Ned Raggett of AllMusic wrote: "Not Alone crashes in like a pop anthem from heaven. It's the absolute standout on People Move On when it comes to showing that Butler can equal the sweep and passion of his previous collaborators."

Writing for Scottish music magazine The List, Alastair Mabbott rated "Not Alone" four stars out of five, saying: "remember a Meat Loaf song called 'Everything Louder Than Everything Else'? Butler does and goes for the symphonic, Spectoresque jugular this time around."

Chuck Taylor of Billboard wrote: "From the start, "Not Alone" builds like an old-style 60s pop hit, with a wall of upfront strings and rusty guitars and a chorus that's terrifically clever and instantly accessible." He later ranked "Not Alone" at number seven in his top ten songs of 1998.

The music video for the title song was directed by James Brown.

== Single track listings ==
1. "Not Alone"
2. "Bye Bye"
3. "It's Alright"
