= Refugees (The Tears song) =

Single by The Tears

from the album Here Come the Tears
- Released: 25 April 2005
- Recorded: 2005
- Genre: Britpop
- Length: 2:53
- Label: Independiente Records
- Songwriters: Brett Anderson and Bernard Butler
- Producer: Bernard Butler

The Tears singles chronology
"Refugees" (2005)	"Lovers" (2005)

"Refugees" is the debut single by the Tears, released on 25 April 2005 on Independiente Records. It charted at number 9 on the UK Singles Chart.

== Background ==
The top-ten charting was relatively good considering the lack of commercial success achieved by the singles of the previous Suede album. The title track's lyrical content is said by Brett Anderson to have political meaning, regarding his disgust towards the treatment of refugees. He said: "There’s a lot of scaremongering right-wing politicians that will tell you that your country is being destabilised by refugees, just to win a few votes. It’s a load of old bollocks. Immigration is essential to living in a healthy, diverse, multicultural 21st century society." The second single from the debut album, "Lovers," was originally slated to be a b-side to the Refugees single. This was changed after the record label decided it was worthy of being on the album. Anderson claimed that b-side "Southern Rain" deserved to be on the album.

== Reception ==
The single was well received. Nick Cowen of Drowned in Sound rated it 8 out of 10, saying: "'Refugees' showcases all the dilettante-like swagger the pair's former band exhibited on its more upbeat numbers. Butler’s spikey guitar noodling compliments Anderson’s plaintive croon beautifully." John Murphy of musicOMH felt that "Anderson sounds more inspired than he has done in years and the song itself boasts a gloriously epic feel, worthy of the first Suede album." British charts commentator James Masterton agreed, calling it "a near perfect recreation of the vibe and the inspiration of the first Suede album." He added: "there is something warm and comfortable about this single, fully deserving of its place inside the Top 10." Kevin Courtney of The Irish Times wrote: "Big, open-armed guitars and us-against-the-world lyrics make this a neat bookend to 'So Young'". Virgin Media felt the song "sounds rather like Suede of old, with both parties having lost none of their knack for a bittersweet melody."

== Single Track Listings ==
=== 7" ===
1. "Refugees"
2. "Break Away"

=== CD1 ===
1. "Refugees"
2. "Southern Rain"

=== CD2 ===
1. "Refugees"
2. "Feels Like Monday"
3. "Branded"
4. "Refugees (Video)"
