= Words on the Floor =

Studio album by Tommy Reilly
- Released: 21 September 2009
- Genre: Acoustic pop
- Length: 39:14
- Label: Polydor
- Producer: Bernard Butler

Tommy Reilly chronology
Words on the Floor (2009)	Hello! I'm Tommy Reilly (2010)

Singles from Words on the Floor
- 1. "Gimme a Call" Released: 25 January 2009; 2. "Jackets" Released: 22 June 2009

Professional ratings
Review scores
Source	Rating
Scotland on Sunday	3/5 stars
The Scotsman	3/5 stars

Words on the Floor is the debut album by singer-songwriter Tommy Reilly, released on 21 September 2009. It was produced by Bernard Butler and recorded in Edwyn Collins' studio. There were three tracks offered on iTunes only for pre-ordering the album.

== Track listing ==
1. "Grab Me by the Collar"
2. "Jackets"
3. "Dials"
4. "Kick the Covers"
5. "Words on the Floor"
6. "Tell Me So"
7. "Minds on Other Things"
8. "Having No-One"
9. "Just Like the Weather"
10. "Gimme a Call"
11. "Entertaining Thoughts"
12. "I Don't Like Coffee" (hidden track)
13. "Cards on the Table" (pre-order only on iTunes)
14. "Torrance" (pre-order only on iTunes)
15. "Gimme a Call" (Demo) (pre-order only on iTunes)

== Tour ==
During the summer, Reilly played at several festivals including a headlining spot on the T Break Stage at T In The Park. He then went on to tour the UK that autumn.

He also played various gigs in Scotland including a sell-out show at Glasgow ABC as well as Homecoming at the SECC.

== Credits ==
- Musicians
  - Tommy Reilly – vocals, Guitars, Keyboard
  - Makoto Sakamoto – drums, Percussion
  - Bernard Butler – bass
  - Scott Neilson – bass (Track 3)
  - Ian Burdge – Cello (Tracks 8 & 11)
- Additional personnel
  - Bernard Butler – production, engineering
  - Chris Potter – Mastering
