= Sons and Daughters (band) =

Scottish rock band (2001–2012)

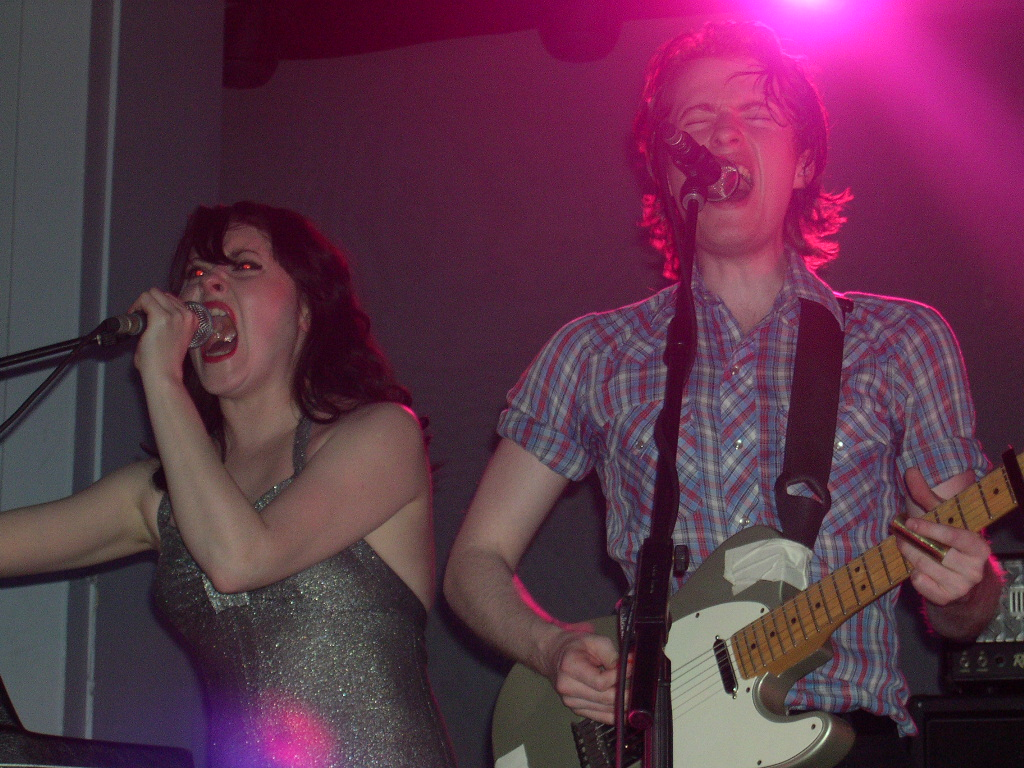
- Bethel & Paterson in 2005

Background information
- Origin: Glasgow, Scotland
- Genre: Indie rock
- Years active: 2001–2012
- Label: Domino Recording Company
- Past members: Adele Bethel; David Gow; Ailidh Lennon; Scott Paterson
- Website: sonsanddaughtersloveyou.com (archived)

Sons and Daughters were a Scottish rock band from Glasgow, Scotland, in existence from 2001 to 2012.

== Biography ==
Conceived while on tour with Arab Strap in 2001, Sons and Daughters was initially Adele Bethel's creation. The band's line-up at first comprised Bethel, David Gow and Ailidh Lennon, and the band began recording.

After the later addition of Scott Paterson as a second vocalist, the band played a number of successful concerts. Their debut release, the twenty five minutes-long Love the Cup was financed by the band and initially released on Ba Da Bing Records label in 2003, and later re-released when Sons and Daughters signed to Domino Records in 2004.

Their second album, The Repulsion Box was released in June 2005. In February 2006 the band were invited to tour with Morrissey on the first leg of his UK tour. Their third album, This Gift, produced by Bernard Butler, was released on 28 January 2008.

After a few years of relative inactivity the band released a free download, "Silver Spell", accompanied by a trailer for their new album, Mirror Mirror, which was released on 13 June 2011.

On 2 November 2012, the band announced that they would no longer continue as a band bringing an end to 11 years of their career.

== Band members ==
- Adele Bethel - Vocals, guitar, piano
- David Gow - Drums, percussion
- Ailidh Lennon - Bass, mandolin, piano
- Scott Paterson - Vocals, guitar

Touring

- Graeme Smilie - Bass (touring bassist while Lennon was on maternity leave, 2008)

== Discography ==
=== Albums ===
- 2003: Love the Cup (re-issued in 2004)
- 2005: The Repulsion Box – UK: No. 70
- 2008: This Gift – UK: No. 66
- 2011: Mirror Mirror – UK: No. 200

=== Singles ===
Year	Song	UK Singles Chart	Album
2004	"Johnny Cash"	68	Love The Cup
2005	"Dance Me In"	40	The Repulsion Box
2005	"Taste the Last Girl"	75	The Repulsion Box
2007	"Gilt Complex"	-	This Gift
2008	"Darling/This Gift"	86	This Gift
2011	"Breaking Fun"	-	Mirror Mirror
2011	"Rose Red"	-	Mirror Mirror
