= QTY (band) =

American indie rock band

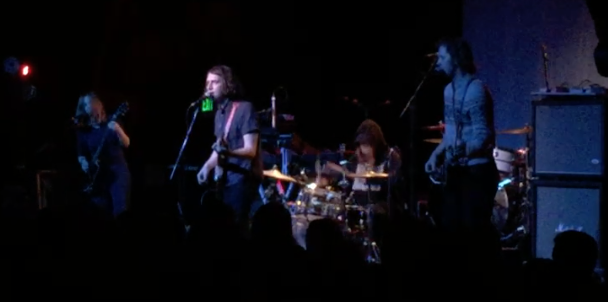
- QTY in 2017

Background information
- Origin: New York City
- Genres: indie rock
- Years active: 2014–present
- Label: Dirty Hit
- Members: Alex Niemetz; Peter Baumann; Julian Harmon
- Past members: Dan Lardner
- Website: qtynyc.com

QTY is an American indie rock band from New York City, signed to Dirty Hit Records. The group originally consisted of singers and guitarists Dan Lardner and Alex Niemetz, as well as bassist Peter Baumann and drummer Julian Harmon.

The band recorded their debut album in London, with production by former Suede member Bernard Butler. The self-titled album was released in December 2017 to early critical acclaim, including favorable reviews in such publications as the NME. The group also earned a spot on the NME 100: 2018 Best New Bands List.

QTY's debut single Rodeo

The group described its sound as "guitar-driven lyrical rock music with pop sensibilities," and was often placed in the lineage of New York rock bands such as The Velvet Underground, Television, and The Strokes, based on the guitar-based sound and Lardner's New York-style laconic vocal delivery. However, their influences stretched beyond their hometown, including glam rock-era acts, especially David Bowie, as well as 1990s lo-fi indie rock bands such as Royal Trux and Silver Jews. Lyrics played a key part in the band's appeal, where Lardner's writing often lauded for its observant, introspective reflections on the struggles of the band's everyday lives.

== History ==
The band formed in 2014, after members of the former band Grand Rapids disbanded the year prior. Lardner and Niemetz recorded some early demos in San Francisco through connections of drummer Julian Harmon, which received attention from Dirty Hit after Lardner's roommate sent the demos to a contact at the record label, who immediately contacted the band expressing interest. The band went on to sign to the label as their first US-based band, having formerly been known for a repertoire of notable British acts including The 1975, Wolf Alice, and Pale Waves. Lardner and Niemetz recorded early singles with Bernard Butler, including "Rodeo" released in October 2016, and "Dress/Undress" released in February 2017.

QTY played few early shows following their signing on the encouragement of the record label, until the band went on their first North American tour opening for the Bad Suns and then a series of headlining shows in late 2017. The band's final shows were in 2018; however Lardner played a small string of solo shows in early 2023 along with Evan Dando, with whom he had struck up a friendship and mentorship for many years.

The name is pronounced by saying each letter individually, but it is a play-off the "cuties", clementines, based on Lardner's reference to Niemetz as a "cutie" due to her hair color. Romy from the band The xx, suggested the band refer to themselves instead as just "Q.T.Y."

Lardner's death was announced on June 15, 2023.

== Discography ==
Singles
Release date	Title
October 31, 2016	"Rodeo"
December 5, 2016	"World Breaker"
February 27, 2017	"Dress/Undress"
April 10, 2017	"Ornament"

Albums
Release date	Title	Track list
December 8, 2017	QTY	1. "Rodeo"; 2. "Dress/Undress"; 3. "Michael"; 4. "Cold Nights"; 5. "Word for This"; 6. "Living Things"; 7. "Notify Me"; 8. "Sad Poetic"; 9. "New Beginnings"; 10. "Salvation"
