= Frankie & The Heartstrings =

English indie rock band

- Origin: Sunderland
- Genres: Indie rock
- Years active: 2008–present
- Labels: Rough Trade; Pop Sex Ltd; Wichita Recordings
- Members: Frankie Francis; Michael Matthews; Michael McKnight; Ross Millard
- Past members: Pete Gofton; Mick Ross; Steven Dennis; Simon Hubbard; Dave Harper
- Website: www.frankieandtheheartstrings.com

Frankie & The Heartstrings are a Sunderland-based indie rock band formed in 2008. The band's debut album, Hunger was released on 21 February 2011, and debuted at No. 32 on the UK albums chart. Known for their partying, they were labelled as the indie Mötley Crüe.

== History ==
Singer Frankie Francis and guitarist Michael McKnight were at college together. Drummer Dave Harper and McKnight had played in local bands for years. McKnight and Harper met Francis at a calypso night in a pub the singer was running at the time in Sunderland and formed the band in December 2008. Singer Francis had intended to play bass in the band, but Harper said that "He was the worst bassist ever". The band made their live debut in Christmas 2008 after friend Steven Dennis joined on bass. Former Kenickie drummer, Johnny X, now known by his real name Pete Gofton, joined as a keyboardist. Pete Gofton has since left (in 2010) and was replaced with Soundtracks for a B-Movie and Minotaurs guitarist Mick Ross. It has been said that Mick "adds steel, bite and panache to their musicianship". Other band names that were considered included Pop Sex and The New Groomers, but they settled on Frankie & The Heartstrings.

The band's debut release was a 10" 7 track live EP 12.09.09, released on their own Pop Sex Ltd records in a limited edition of 500 in November 2009. The following month they followed it up with a double A side 7" single Hunger/Fragile released on Rough Trade. That month they played their first major tour supporting Florence & The Machine.

In April 2010, the band released their second single "Tender / I Want You Back". "Tender" was written by McKnight and was originally called "Tender Is the Night". It was recorded with James Ford of Simian Mobile Disco. Further gigging continued throughout 2010 including slots at the Glastonbury Festival, Summer Sundae and Latitude Festival, overseas shows in Europe, New York and Tokyo and support slots across the UK supporting The Futureheads and Edwyn Collins, who produced the band's debut album in the late summer and early Autumn at his West Heath Studios in London. The band released their third single "Ungrateful" in October 2010.

The band's sound has drawn comparisons to Orange Juice and Dexy's Midnight Runners.

Hunger, Frankie and the Heartstrings' debut album, was released in the UK on 21 February 2011; it charted at No. 32 on the UK albums chart. Single "The Postcard" followed on 9 May 2011. The band then went on to support Kaiser Chiefs and The Vaccines on their UK tours later in the year. A non-Hunger-related single, "Everybody Looks Better (In the Right Light)", produced by Suede guitarist Bernard Butler, was released on 28 November 2011. Its b-side, "The Way That You Kiss", was produced by Ryan Jarman of The Cribs.

The band released their second album, The Days Run Away, on 3 June 2013. At the same time, they opened their own record store in Sunderland, Pop Recs Ltd. The store was initially only to be open for two weeks as a pop up store to promote The Days Run Away, but community response provoked the band to continue operating it permanently.

In 2014 guitarist Mick Ross was replaced by Ross Millard of The Futureheads. In 2015, after bassist Steven Dennis left the band, they were joined by Michael Matthews of This Ain't Vegas and Sky Larkin.

In July 2015 the band released their third album Decency. Recorded in late summer 2014 at Leeds' Suburban Homes studio with MJ of Hookworms at the controls, it was also the first release to feature Ross Millard. The band launched the album with shows in London and Newcastle as well as at Pop Recs Ltd. The band later toured both on their own and as support for The Charlatans, with Simon Hubbard on guitar and James Leonard Hewitson joining them on brass for a number of their dates.

Drummer Dave Harper died on 25 August 2021. His legacy and drive lives on in Pop Recs Ltd.

== Discography ==
=== Studio albums ===
| Year | Album details | Peak chart positions |
| Year | Album details | UK |
|---|---|---|
| 2011 | Hunger: Released: 21 February 2011; Label: Pop Sex Ltd/Wichita; Formats: CD, Digital download, Vinyl | 32 |
| 2013 | The Days Run Away: Released: 3 June 2013; Label: Pop Sex Ltd/Wichita; Formats: CD, Digital download, Vinyl | |
| 2015 | Decency: Released: 10 July 2015; Label: Pop Sex Ltd/Wichita; Formats: CD, Digital download, Vinyl | |

=== Singles ===
| Year | Single | Peak chart positions | Album |
|---|---|---|---|
| 2009 | "12.09.09" | | – |
| 2009 | "Hunger/Fragile" | | Hunger |
| 2010 | "Tender/I Want You Back" | | Hunger |
| 2010 | "Ungrateful" | | Hunger |
| 2011 | "Everybody Looks Better (In the Right Light)" | | – |
