= People Move On =

Studio album by Bernard Butler
- Released: 6 April 1998
- Recorded: February – July 1997
- Studios: RAK, London; Air, London
- Genres: Pop; rock; folk
- Length: 63:39
- Label: Creation
- Producer: Bernard Butler

Bernard Butler chronology
People Move On (1998)	Friends and Lovers (1999)

Singles from People Move On
- 1. "Stay" Released: 5 January 1998; 2. "Not Alone" Released: 16 March 1998; 3. "A Change of Heart" Released: 15 June 1998

People Move On is the debut studio album of English singer-songwriter Bernard Butler that was released on 6 April 1998 through Creation Records. After a dispute with David McAlmont over the McAlmont & Butler project, Butler collaborated with various artists before starting his solo career. Following a brief period with Sony LRD in early 1996, by the end of that year, Butler had signed to Creation and switched managers from Geoff Travis to Gail Colson. Butler produced the sessions for People Move On at RAK and Air Studios, both in London, between February and July 1997. The album, which is described as a pop, rock, and folk release, has been compared to the work of Jeff Buckley, Neil Young, and Wilco.

Music critics gave People Move On generally favourable reviews, though some of them criticized Butler's ability as a vocalist. The album charted at number 11 in the UK Albums Chart; all three of its singles charted on the UK Singles Chart, where "Stay" – the album's best-selling single – peaked at number 12. The British Phonographic Industry (BPI) certified the album silver in the United Kingdom. Before the release of the first two singles of People Move On, "Stay" on 5 January 1998 and "Not Alone" on 16 March 1998, Butler held a four-show residency in London. "A Change of Heart" was released as the album's third and final single on 15 June 1998, which was surrounded by festival performances. Butler closed the year with his first tour of the UK. People Move On was reissued in 2022; the re-release includes a version with newly recorded vocals, which some critics praised.

== Background ==
Between the late 1980s and 1994, Bernard Butler served as a guitarist of British rock band Suede, whose self-titled debut studio album won the 1993 Mercury Prize. In June 1994, Butler left the band part-way through the recording of their second studio album Dog Man Star. He disliked frontman Brett Anderson's desire to be a pop star; Anderson responded by saying Butler was difficult to work with. In 1995, Butler began working with soul singer David McAlmont; the pair worked under the name McAlmont & Butler; the duo released the single "Yes", which reached number ten in the UK. The duo split due to personal issues before their debut studio album The Sound Of... McAlmont & Butler was released the same year.

Butler spent some time collaborating with Bryan Ferry, Neneh Cherry, and Aimee Mann, and produced Hopper's sole album, English and French (1996). Butler was in contact with James vocalist Tim Booth, with whom he worked with on Booth's project Booth and the Bad Angel. Butler unsuccessfully tried to persuade Booth to leave James and start a band with him. Butler spent two weeks in New York City with his wife, contemplated what to do with his life, and decided to start a solo career.

Butler started learning to sing, which became a long process for him, singing to himself or along to other people's music in his residence. In early 1996, he made some demos, his vocals on which received unfavourable feedback. By March 1996, Butler was in the process of writing material for his first solo album, which Sony LRD tentatively expected to release in early 1997. His contract with Sony was the result of Sony's deal with Suede's label Nude Records. Butler had been writing using a 19th-century harmonium, as well as acoustic guitar picking. By this point, he was being managed by Rough Trade Records founder Geoff Travis, who restricted the time Butler spent collaborating with other artists. Working with others in the preceding two years helped Butler refine his song writing and gave him insight into music.

== Writing and production ==
In mid 1996, Butler received a call from Richard Ashcroft's management, who asked whether Butler would like to collaborate with Ashcroft alongside the Verve members Simon Jones and Peter Salisbury for an album. Butler, who was still writing for his own album, was interested in the offer. After three weeks without any contact from Ashcroft, Ashcroft's manager transported Ashcroft, Jones and Salisbury to Butler's house. They worked in a rehearsal room for two days and practiced material that would later appear on the Verve's third studio album Urban Hymns (1997). Butler spent a week as a member of the Verve before they decided to reinstate their original guitarist Nick McCabe. Butler recorded instrumental demos at Mike Hedges' studio at Château de la Motte in Domfront, France, with Hedges and engineer Ian Grimble, for a week in October 1996. Butler wrote six rough drafts of new songs; he went back to London and met up with Makoto Sakamoto, with whom he had worked as part of McAlmont & Butler. Butler signed with Alan McGee's label Creation Records in December 1996.

Shortly after the signing, Butler went to Air Studios to visit labelmates Teenage Fanclub, who were working on their album Songs from Northern Britain (1997). He met engineer George Shilling and engaged him for his upcoming debut solo album. Gail Colson became Butler's manager in February 1997 after being impressed by a version of "Stay". Recording sessions for People Move On began in February 1997 at RAK Studios, London, with Butler producing the recordings. When he entered the studio, all the material he had was acoustic-based, and later remarked that he wished some of the tracks were tracked that way, such as "Woman I Know" and "Not Alone". Nick Wollage, who Butler had met when working on McAlmont & Butler material, acted as recording engineer. In July 1997, Butler took a two-week break from the studio to write extra material; he had planned to start mixing during this time but recorded four new songs instead. Sessions then moved to Air Studios, with Shilling as engineer; Shilling and Wollage were assisted by Claire Lewis and Alex Seel, respectively. Denise Johnson, formerly of Primal Scream, travelled to the studio from Manchester and spent one day recording vocals. Butler, who suggested Johnson, was aware of her from her contributions to Screamadelica (1991) by Primal Scream, who were also on Creation at the time. Shilling and Butler mixed the recordings in September 1997, and the album was mastered by Chris Blair at Abbey Road Studios, London, the following month.

== Composition and lyrics ==
Musically, the sound of People Move On has been described as pop, rock, and folk, steering away from the glam-pop of Suede. It has been compared to the work of Jeff Buckley, Neil Young, and Wilco. MTV's Dakota Smith referred to it as a "collection of love ballads, symphony-backed anthems, catchy pop refrains and pared-down guitars and lyrics". Lucy O'Brien of The Independent noted influences from classic rock from the late 1960s and 1970s, and wrote: "People Move On echoes the early Seventies cool rock singer/songwriting era in its heartfelt sentiment and warm, melodic approach." Despite this, Butler has stressed that it was not a "retro record". Some songs on the record have a Spector-esque influence, which according to Mac Randall of Rolling Stone, display an "old-fashioned big-pop-production quality." The album marked Butler's first attempt at singing, which Gail Worley of Ink 19 called "sweet, clear, and highly emotive". Consumable Online writer Robin Lapid found Butler to be baring his "soul and seems to allude to the fruition of recent personal highs, including marriage and new fatherhood".

Butler wrote all the songs, and played a majority of the instruments. He did not plan to do so initially, but as he was not interested in spending time to find competent musicians, he opted to play various instruments by himself. Sakamoto did drums, and the Brilliant Strings played violin, cello, and viola on the songs "Woman I Know", "People Move On", "Autograph", "Not Alone", and "When You Grow". The strings were conducted by Billy McGee, who expanded the arrangements with Butler, having previously worked with him on "Yes". Johnson sung guest backing vocals on "Woman I Know", "People Move On", "Autograph", and "Stay". Wollage played saxophone on "Autograph" and "Not Alone", the latter featuring guest backing vocals from Edwyn Collins. Shilling added cello to "When You Grow", which also starred Richard Bissill on French horn. According to Butler, most of the ideas on the album were created in the studio, with only four songs written beforehand.

Butler said he had considered naming the album Girls, Girls, Girls purely for the "sleeve shot possibilities," before it was christened People Move On. The opening track, the psychedelic soul of "Woman I Know" recalls the sound of All Things Must Pass (1970) by George Harrison and the work of Spiritualized, and deals with his relationship with his wife. The Verve-aping of "You Just Know" sees Butler chasing artistic vision. Butler wrote "People Move On", which was compared to After the Gold Rush (1970) by Young, about the time he sold papers in Leicester Square, London. In it, he describes the various people he saw and conversations they would be having. "A Change of Heart" is a slower-tempo song with piano, which was reminiscent of "Knockin' on Heaven's Door" (1973) by Bob Dylan. The blues rock of "Autograph" showcases Butler's guitar-playing abilities, recalling "The Low Spark of High Heeled Boys" (1971) by Traffic.

The folk rock song "You Light the Fire" is done in the style of "Mood for a Day" (1971) by Yes. Butler said it was inspired by Bert Jansch and Nick Drake, and marked his first foray into fingerpicking. "Not Alone" is a 1970s-esque, Righteous Brothers-lite gospel pop track, held up by violins. Butler wrote the track in a Parisian hotel room after watching MTV and witnessing videos for "all of these crap pop records. And I just sat there and thought to myself, 'I could do this better than these people'". "Stay" is about the difficulty associated with change, influenced by a conversation Butler had with his wife while on a train to France. It opens with an acoustic guitar, followed by piano and Butler's vocals. Other instrumentation is slowly added, crecendoing, and ending with a coda. The song was written on a piano while Butler was focused on making a droning sound with its bass notes. The album's closing track, "I'm Tired", was written following the McAlmont & Butler album. Butler explained: "You know when you have people around your house [...] and they won't leave? You don't want to be the centre of attention."

== Release and promotion ==
In December 1997, Sony had Butler film an electronic press kit, where he performed in front of a camera operator for an hour. It was recorded at a rehearsal studio on Benwell Road, London, and was ultimately scrapped. The music video for "Stay" debuted in the UK on the MTV's programme Up for It on 15 December 1997. The track was released as the first single from People Move On on 5 January 1998. The UK version included "Hotel Splendide" and "The Sea", while the Australian and European editions also featured a radio edit of "Stay". In the 7 February 1998 issue of Billboard, People Move On was announced for release in two months' time. "Not Alone" was released as the second single on 16 March 1998, with "Bye Bye" and "It's Alright" as its B-sides. The Japanese edition of the single, released through Epic Records, included all of the tracks from "Not Alone" and the UK version of "Stay". Butler held a four-date residency at the Highbury Garage in London, which was followed by an acoustic show shortly afterwards. His backing band for these performances included guitarist Andy Miller of Dodgy, and keyboardist Terry Miles of Denim, bassist Chris Bowers of Hopper, and Sakamoto on drums. A promotional cassette featuring three recordings from the residency subsequently appeared on an issue of NME.

People Move On was released through Creation Records in the UK on 6 April 1998; its United States release occurred through Columbia Records on 14 April 1998. Butler originally wanted a different photograph taken by Jill Furmanovsky as the front cover but this idea was rejected. On 17 April 1998, Butler and his band appeared on the BBC television show Later... with Jools Holland, where they performed "You Just Know" and "Stay". On 3 May 1998, the music video for "Stay" was premiered in the US on 120 Minutes. Initially planned for April 1998, the track was issued to modern rock radio stations in the US in May 1998. In June 1998, Butler played a one-off show in the US, supported Pulp for a gig in the UK, and performed at T in the Park and Glastonbury Festival. During the performance at Glastonbury, an acoustic guitar with which Butler wrote the majority of the album's tracks was stolen. The shows marked the appearance of Neil Halstead of Mojave 3 as Butler's touring guitarist, replacing Miller, who was busy with Dodgy. "A Change of Heart" was released as the album's third single on 15 June 1998, and included "My Domain" and "More Than I Thought" as B-sides. Butler then embarked on a tour of the US in August and September, which was followed by five shows in Japan. In October 1998, he embarked on his first tour of the UK. Some of the shows had to be rescheduled or cancelled because Butler was suffering from various illnesses. In the middle of the month, "Not Alone" was issued to modern rock stations in the US.

=== Reissues ===
In 2021, People Move On was re-pressed on vinyl as part of that year's Record Store Day. The following year, a four-CD set including a version of the album with re-recorded vocals and a new rendition of "I'm Tired" was released. For a number of years, Demon Records had been asking Butler if he wanted to reissue the album; he repeatedly rejected the idea. While reviewing his body of past work, Demon asked again and Butler accepted the offer provided he could re-record his vocal tracks. Butler recorded the new vocals at Studio 355 in London; he sung over 1997 instrumental mixes of the songs that had been saved to Digital Audio Tapes that were made during the mixing process. Because several iterations of the songs were made during mixing, the sounds of the individual instruments differ from the final issued version of the album. No instrumental mix of "I'm Tired" existed so Butler re-recorded the song.

The introduction to "A Change of Heart", which Butler thought was "boring", was shortened, and "People Move On" and "In Vain" were given extra miniature-guitar solos. The re-recorded vocal version was released separately as a two-LP set. This edition restored the originally intended photo by Furmanovsky as the cover. "People Move On", "Not Alone" and "Stay", all with new vocals, were made available for streaming prior to the release. The reissues were promoted with performances in Glasgow and London. The B-sides, alongside versions with newly re-recorded vocals, were included on the vinyl-only People Move On: The B-Sides, 1998 + 2021 as part of the 2022 Record Store Day.

== Reception ==
Professional ratings
Review scores
Source	Rating
AllMusic	3.5/5 stars
The Guardian	4/5 stars
The Independent	3/4 stars
Melody Maker	4/5 stars
NME	7/10
Pitchfork	5.1/10
Q	4/5 stars
Rolling Stone	3/5 stars
The Times	4/5 stars
Uncut	4/5 stars

Music critics gave People Move On generally favourable reviews. Writing in 1999, Neil McCormick of The Daily Telegraph said the album was met with a "kind of astonished acclaim", which was "far better, quite frankly, than anyone expected". The Sydney Morning Herald's Bernard Zuel said he was "prepared to like [the album]; I was surprised to find myself loving it". Several critics, however, criticized Butler's vocal abilities; according to one reviewer; "his voice doesn't carry enough weight to give the songs a killer instinct". In response to the criticism, Butler stated; "I'm not claiming I'm a technically talented singer ... but my voice allowed me to express a part of me I had found very difficult to express in conversation before". The Telegraph writer David Cheal said Butler "hits all the notes and his voice has a distinctive quality". Zuel considered Butler a "more than capable singer," whose voice has a "high slightly reedy tenor". Bradley Smith of Nude as the News said Butler has a "beautiful voice – almost angelic" and that the album displays "a songwriter coming into his own", which Lapid agreed with.

Simon Evans of Birmingham Post highly praised People Move On, saying Butler had finally offered the "kind of high-grade solo album he always seemed capable of when he finally gave up the celebrity sessioning". Comparing the album to the last output by fellow Creation-label band Oasis, he said People Move On is the type of "tuneful, fun, album Oasis should have made" following (What's the Story) Morning Glory? (1995) as Butler leans into "an emotional and musical directness, taking in muscular riffs, big melodies, luscious ballads, undulating slide guitar fills". The Independent's Andy Gill alluded to the album's classic rock influences aside from the intermittent "ponderous moment ... it is a notable, and welcome, success". He went on to say Butler's "sheer ambition hoists most tracks to their optimum level, allowing him for the first time to be defined by his future rather than his past". Montreal Mirror writer Mireille Silcott called it a "thickly varnished, highly emotive production with lightly cheesed melodics that only an Englisher can manage".

Reviewing the 2022 reissue, Terry Staunton of Uncut said for the majority of the album, the "maniacal guitar riffs" heard in Suede "take a back seat, only occasionally cutting loose and never overwhelming the innate simplicity of some elegantly persuasive songs". Martin Aston of Mojo said there is a "palpable shedding of tension underpinned these 63 minutes [which] centred on the creamiest vibrato guitar since Mick Ronson". He said Butler's "callow singing ... strained to keep up" with the quality of music and that the new vocals make Butler's "soulful grain resemble a different singer". Classic Rock writer Emma Johnston called the reissue "an ambitious collection ... characterised by his histrionic guitar work" and that the reissue's "real star" is the new-vocal version, which "brings a whole new dimension to old favourites". Kieron Tyler of The Arts Desk stated Butler's vocals are "more full these days, with a presence lacking before. It is more dramatic, more muscular than in 1998."

The original issue of People Move On peaked at number 11 on the UK Albums Chart, and all three singles charted in the UK Singles Chart; "Stay" at number 12, "Not Alone" at number 27, and "A Change of Heart" at number 45. Three months after its release, the British Phonographic Industry (BPI) certified the album silver in the UK.

== Track listing ==
All songs written and produced by Bernard Butler.

No.	Title	Length
1.	"Woman I Know"	7:51
2.	"You Just Know"	4:39
3.	"People Move On"	4:39
4.	"A Change of Heart"	4:41
5.	"Autograph"	8:45
6.	"You Light the Fire"	3:53
7.	"Not Alone"	3:52
8.	"When You Grow"	5:25
9.	"You've Got What It Takes"	4:50
10.	"Stay"	5:18
11.	"In Vain"	4:55
12.	"I'm Tired"	4:54

== Personnel ==
Credits adapted from the booklet of People Move On.

Musicians

- Bernard Butler – vocals, guitar, keyboards, string arranger
- Makoto Sakamoto – drums, percussion
- Denise Johnson – guest backing vocals (tracks 1, 3, 5 and 10)
- The Brilliant Strings – strings (tracks 1, 3, 5, 7 and 8)
  - Gini Ball – violin
  - Jackie Norrie – violin
  - Margaret Roseberry – violin
  - Anne Wood – violin
  - Anna Hemery – violin
  - Sally Herbert – violin
  - Anne Stephenson – violin
  - Dinah Beamish – cello
  - Siân Bell – cello
  - Chris Pitisillides – viola
  - Ellen Blair – viola
  - Billy McGee – conductor, string arranger
- Nick Wollage – saxophone (tracks 5 and 7)
- Edwyn Collins – guest backing vocals (track 7)
- George Shilling – cello (track 8)
- Richard Bissill – French horn (track 8)

Production and design

- Bernard Butler – producer, mixing
- George Shilling – mixing, recording engineer
- Nick Wollage – recording engineer
- Claire Lewis – assistant engineer
- Alex Seel – assistant engineer
- Chris Blair – mastering
- Blue Source – art direction
- Amber Rowlands – photography
- Jill Furmanovsky – studio photography

== Charts and certifications ==
=== Weekly charts ===
Chart performance for People Move On
Chart (1998)	Peak position
UK Albums (Official Charts)	11

=== Certifications ===
Certifications for People Move On
Region	Certification	Certified units/sales
United Kingdom (BPI)	Silver	60,000^{^}
^{^} Shipments figures based on certification alone.
