= Lovers (song) =

Single by The Tears

from the album Here Come the Tears
- Released: 27 June 2005
- Recorded: 2005
- Genre: Britpop
- Length: 4:02
- Label: Independiente Records
- Songwriters: Brett Anderson and Bernard Butler
- Producer: Bernard Butler

The Tears singles chronology
"Refugees" (2005)	"Lovers" (2005)

"Lovers" is the second single by the Tears from their debut album Here Come the Tears, released on 27 June 2005 on Independiente Records. The title track was originally slated to be a B-side for the album's first single, "Refugees", until the record label pushed the band to put it on the album (consequently pushing the album release date back from 2 May to 6 June) and subsequently made it a single. It reached number 24 in the UK Singles Chart.

As with previous single "Refugees", "Lovers" was warmly received by critics. Tim Lee of musicOMH, wrote that the song is "an upbeat, soaring, epic number that's somewhat like "Yes" by McAlmont and some guy called Butler. It's rather spectacularly good. And just think, if they'd done it five years ago, people might have actually cared."

== Track listings ==
7"

1. "Lovers" (single version)
2. "Because You're Worthless"

CD1

1. "Lovers" (single version)
2. "Song for the Migrant Worker"

CD2

1. "Lovers" (single version)
2. "Low-Life"
3. "The Primitive"
4. "Lovers" (video)
