= The Tears =

British rock supergroup

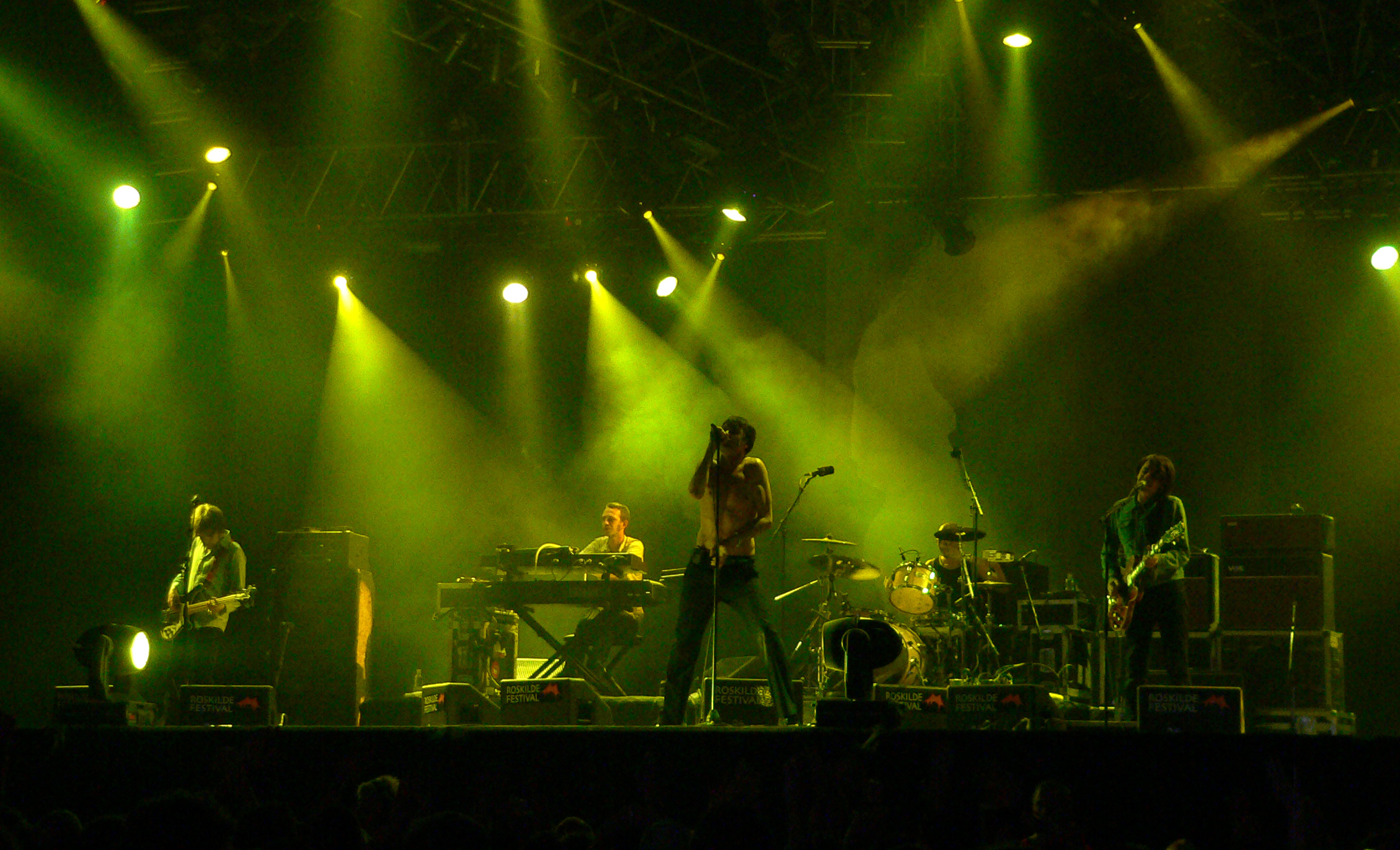
- The Tears performing at Roskilde Festival in Denmark in 2005 (L–R: Nathan Fisher, Will Foster, Brett Anderson, Makoto Sakamoto, Bernard Butler).

Background information
- Origin: London, England
- Genres: Alternative rock, post-Britpop
- Years active: 2004–2006
- Label: Independiente
- Past members: Brett Anderson; Bernard Butler; Nathan Fisher; Will Foster; Makoto Sakamoto

The Tears were an English rock supergroup formed in 2004 by ex-Suede bandmates Brett Anderson and Bernard Butler, along with the former Delicatessen and Lodger members Will Foster (keyboardist), bassist Nathan Fisher, and Bernard Butler session drummer Makoto Sakamoto. The duo Anderson and Butler were a much anticipated reunion and music critics praised their first concerts and only album, Here Come the Tears. However, the project was short-lived as they disbanded in 2006, which allowed Anderson to focus on his solo career before Suede reformed in 2010, Butler became a full-time producer, and Foster has worked as additional musician for the Fratellis since 2008.

== History ==
In 1994, when Bernard Butler walked out of Suede, they were the biggest new band in Britain. He was pilloried in the music press and characterised as "demanding, difficult and egotistical" by Brett Anderson. "When he left the band we pretty much hated each other as much as two people can hate each other," admitted Anderson in an interview with The Times. The pair parted company in July 1994 while recording Suede's second album Dog Man Star, which resulted in a major fallout due to musical differences and Anderson's hedonistic lifestyle. As Suede soldiered on and Butler forged a solo career, both with varying degrees of success, they continued to snipe at each other in the press. Though Butler and Anderson had not spoken to each other for nine years, Anderson claimed getting back in touch with Butler was not difficult. The band decided on being named after a line from a Philip Larkin poem, Femmes Damnées, which ends with the line: "The only sound heard is the sound of tears".

The band played their first ever live show on 14 December 2004 at the Oxford Zodiac. Things went as expected for the "new" band, and most new songs were received well by those attending the first set of shows. When asked during a concert by a fan to play Suede song, "The Drowners", Anderson replied saying, "Did somebody say they wanted to hear "The Drowners"? You've come to the wrong gig, mate."

Apart from relatively minor reviews of the first clutch of live shows, The Tears' first press was a review of "Refugees", an interview with Anderson, and a poster in The Sun on 15 April. The next major article was by Alexis Petridis in The Guardian, which ended on an extremely optimistic note: "the pair seem artistically reinvigorated by each other's company. Anderson talks excitedly of Tears songs like the ballad Asylum, inspired by his father's struggle with depression, as having moved away from ‘Suede cliches or Brett Anderson cliches ... it's not, you know, opiated fop territory.’"

From the start, Anderson was insistent that the band would not be playing any songs by Suede. Things would change over time, however, as the band ended up playing the B-side, "The Living Dead", to an enthusiastic reception, during an encore for their show at the Sheffield Leadmill in April. In April 2005, the band's first single, "Refugees", was released. The single was a success and peaked in the Top 10 in the UK Singles Chart.

The album, Here Come the Tears followed on 6 June 2005, which the album was recorded in secrecy during the entire of 2004. It was released to generally favourable reviews that helped solidify the duo's comeback. However it failed to crack the Top 10 of the UK Albums Chart. Anderson felt that the project was eclipsed by the curiosity in the reconciliation with Butler, saying: "...the story of me and Bernard getting back together again was far too juicy, and it overshadowed the music completely. I am proud of the record we made, but the obsession with us stopped us enjoying it." In late June, the band played a set at the John Peel stage at the Glastonbury Festival. The second single from the debut album, entitled "Lovers", was released in June. Though a significantly lower charting than the previous single, it still managed to reach number 24.

More than a month later, Anderson announced that he would release his long-awaited solo album in between the touring for Here Come the Tears, and the release of the band's follow up album. After playing several festivals including Glastonbury and T in the Park along with international gigs, the band announced a European tour with dates in October and November. However, the tour was soon cancelled and the band were dropped from their label.

In late April 2006, Anderson posted a message on the band's message board announcing the band were on temporary hiatus because "no one ever wanted this thing to get caught up within the drudgery of the whole tour/record/tour cycle anyway". In addition, he announced that he had completed his debut solo album and that it would see light in early 2007, hinting that the second Tears record would most likely come after that. In August 2006, the band's official site and forum were closed. In 2007, Anderson admitted in an interview that The Tears were about to write their second album, however they decided to split because they were simply not enjoying it. Asked about a second record, Anderson replied. "The chance of there being another Tears record in the future is pretty good actually." These hopes were short-lived, however when Butler announced his retirement from performing in 2008 to concentrate on producing. Anderson later decided to become a full-time solo artist, releasing three solo albums before Suede reformed in 2010.

The band's drummer, Makoto Sakamoto, died on 21 August 2018 from an unspecified illness, as confirmed by Bernard Butler on Twitter.

== Members ==
- Brett Anderson – lead vocals
- Bernard Butler – lead and rhythm guitars, backing vocals
- Nathan Fisher – bass guitar, backing vocals
- Will Foster – keyboards, piano
- Makoto "Mako" Sakamoto – drums, percussion (died 2018)

== Discography ==
=== Albums ===
- Here Come the Tears (2005) - No. 15 UK

=== Singles ===
- "Refugees" (2005) No. 9 UK
- "Lovers" (2005) No. 24 UK
