= Natalie McCool =

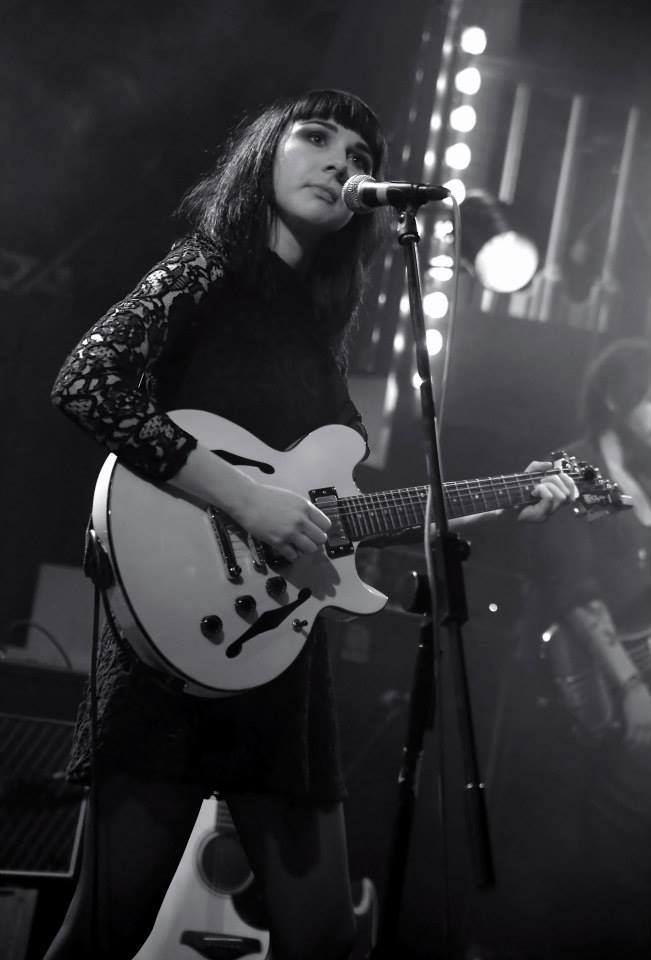
- Natalie McCool performing at a show.

Background information
- Born: Natalie Hannah McCool; Whiston, Merseyside, England
- Origin: Widnes, Cheshire, England
- Genres: Pop, indie, alternative, electronic
- Occupations: Singer, songwriter, musician
- Instruments: Vocals, guitar, bass guitar, piano, keyboards, percussion
- Years active: 2012–present
- Website: nataliemccool.co.uk

Natalie Hannah McCool is an English singer-songwriter and musician. She first became recognised when she won a Yamaha-sponsored national songwriting competition judged by Coldplay frontman Chris Martin. While at university, she received a one-to-one songwriting session with Paul McCartney.

== Discography ==
=== Studio albums ===
- The Great Unknown (2016)
