= Tommy Reilly (Scottish musician) =

- Birth name: Tommy Reilly
- Born: 7 March 1989 (age 36)
- Origin: Torrance, East Dunbartonshire, Scotland
- Genres: Acoustic pop
- Occupation(s): Singer, songwriter
- Years active: 2008–present
- Labels: A&M Records, Euphonien, Gizmo Tunes Recordings
- Website: Official website

Tommy Reilly (born 7 March 1989) is a Scottish singer–songwriter from Torrance, East Dunbartonshire. He gained recognition after winning the Channel 4 TV show Orange unsignedAct. Shortly after, Reilly's first single "Gimme A Call" reached number 14 in the UK Singles Chart in its first week of release. Reilly released his debut album, Words on the Floor, in 2009. His follow-up, Hello! I'm Tommy Reilly, was released less than a year later on 14 June 2010. In December 2015 he released the 6-track EP "Weightless", recorded in the Scottish highlands and released by Gizmo Tunes Recordings. Reilly is also composing music for TV and movies, for instance for the Scottish movie production Anna and the Apocalypse. The duo arranged the music and wrote the score for “Our Ladies” for Sony International, and they supplied songs for Steven Spielberg’s revival of Animaniacs.

== Orange unsignedAct ==
Reilly entered the television talent show Orange unsignedAct after hearing that his friends entered the competition themselves. After the first round in the open auditions, Reilly was picked out, however he flew from Glasgow to the auditions and made it through with four yeses from the judges. Jo Whiley at first decided at the open auditions he did not have enough experience, but later re-thought her decision. He later received a place on the Unsigned act tour.

Reilly then went to win the competition via public vote with Hip Parade coming second and Scarlet Harlots coming third place. Reilly received a £60,000 advance, a recording contract with Universal Music, a single release, an album deal and a multi-media marketing campaign.

== Words on the Floor ==
After winning Orange UnsignedAct, Reilly released his debut single, "Gimme A Call", which reached number 14 in the UK Singles Chart.

Soon after he began recording his debut album, Words on the Floor, which was released on 3 August 2009. The album proved commercially unsuccessful, and only managed to reach number 79 in the UK Albums Chart.

Reilly headlined the T Break Stage at 2009's T in the Park, and appeared on the main stage of Lovebox Festival 2009 in Victoria Park, London. Soon after, he toured the UK in support of the album.

== Hello! I'm Tommy Reilly ==
Shortly after the release of Words on the Floor A&M ended Reilly's recording contract, soon after this he signed with Euphonios and recording began on the follow-up to Tommy's debut release. The second studio album, titled Hello! I'm Tommy Reilly, was produced by Roddy Hart who supported Reilly on the Words on the Floor Tour.

The album, Hello! I'm Tommy Reilly, was released on 14 June 2010 with the first single taken from the album, "Take Me Away For the Night" released the week before on 7 June. To promote the new album ahead of its release, Reilly went on tour in the UK supporting Justin Currie and The Proclaimers throughout May and June 2010. Following this Reilly announced that he would tour again, this time as the headline act throughout September 2010.

== Waking a Sleepwalker ==
On 23 April 2012, Reilly started a PledgeMusic project with the aim to raise funds to enable him to record and independently release his third studio album. On 26 July 2012, the project had reached 100% of its target. The album was released to pledgers on 24 July titled Waking A Sleepwalker. EP

== Weightless EP ==
After the intensity of writing and touring his first 3 LPs, Tommy took a year off to complete a Masters at the Glasgow School of Art. With a fresh perspective he returned working on his 6-track EP ‘Weightless’, released on Gizmo Tunes Recordings in December 2015. All songs were written and composed by Tommy Reilly and recorded in the Scottish highlands. The EP was co-produced by Ryan Joseph Burns and Gordon Skene, mixed by Ryan Joseph Burns and mastered by Paul McGeechan.

== Discography ==
=== Albums ===
- Words on the Floor (2009) UK No. 79
- Hello! I'm Tommy Reilly (2010)
- Waking a Sleepwalker (2013)

=== EPs ===
- Weightless (2015)

=== Singles ===
- "Gimme a Call" (2009) - UK No. 14
- "Jackets" (2009) - SCO No. 1
- "Take Me Away for the Night" (2010)
- "Make the Bed" (2010)
- "Shut My Eyes" (2013)
- "This Time of Year" (2015)
- "Weightless" (2015)

== Film and TV ==
Together with Roddy Hart, Reilly composed the music of the zombie comedy-musical Anna and the Apocalypse. The film hit cinemas in 2018. They have also been writing songs for the first two seasons of the revival of Animaniacs for Warner Bros. as executive produced by Steven Spielberg, which aired on the Hulu network from 2020.

== Awards and nominations ==
Reilly was shortlisted in the BAFTA Scotland New Talent Awards 2016 (for his work in The Beholder).

The Animaniacs song 'Suffragette Song' won a Daytime Emmy Award for Outstanding Original Song for a Preschool, Children’s or Animated Program, along with Roddy Hart, Andrew Barbot and Jess Lacher.
