= This Gift (album) =

Studio album by Sons and Daughters
- Released: 28 January 2008
- Genre: Indie rock
- Length: 40:33
- Label: Domino
- Producer: Bernard Butler

Sons and Daughters chronology
The Repulsion Box (2005)	This Gift (2008)	Mirror Mirror (2011)

Professional ratings
Review scores
Source	Rating
Allmusic	4.5/5 stars
Drowned In Sound	(9/10)
Pitchfork Media	(7.7/10)
stv.tv	4/5 stars
This Is Fake DIY	3.5/5 stars

This Gift is the third album by Sons and Daughters, released by Domino Records on 28 January 2008 on CD and LP format.

It is also available as a limited edition two-disc version, featuring six additional live tracks. The album charted at number 66.

== Track listing ==
1. "Gilt Complex" - 3:39
2. "Split Lips" - 2:18
3. "The Nest" - 4:14
4. "Rebel with the Ghost" - 3:01
5. "Chains" - 2:37
6. "This Gift" - 4:06
7. "Darling" - 3:21
8. "Flags" - 3:08
9. "Iodine" - 3:02
10. "The Bell" - 2:46
11. "House in My Head" - 3:51
12. "Goodbye Service" - 4:37
13. "Killer" - 4:04. (iTunes Bonus Track, a cover of the popular song by Adamski and Seal)

== Two disc set ==
1. "Chains (live)"
2. "Darling (live)"
3. "Gilt Complex (live)"
4. "The Nest (live)"
5. "House in My Head (live)"
6. "Johnny Cash (live)"
