= Friends and Lovers (Bernard Butler song) =

Single by Bernard Butler

from the album Friends and Lovers
- Released: 20 August 1999
- Recorded: 1999
- Genre: Pop rock, Britpop
- Length: 4:13
- Label: Creation
- Songwriter: Bernard Butler
- Producer: Bernard Butler

Bernard Butler singles chronology
"A Change of Heart" (1998)	"Friends and Lovers" (1999)	"You Must Go On" (1999)

"Friends and Lovers" is the fourth single from Bernard Butler released in August 1999. It is the first single taken from the album Friends and Lovers. The single had a limited release of one thousand 10" vinyl one sided singles. These were given out to visitors to Butlers website on a first-come first-served basis.

This song is more upbeat with a more pop-rock arrangement than his previous effort.

== Single track listings ==
No.	Title	Length
1.	"Friends and Lovers"	4:13
