= Hunger (Frankie & The Heartstrings album) =

Studio album by Frankie & The Heartstrings
- Released: (United Kingdom) 21 February 2011
- Recorded: West Heath Studios, London
- Genre: Indie rock, indie pop
- Length: 34:36
- Label: Pop Sex Ltd.
- Producer: Edwyn Collins, Frankie & The Heartstrings

Singles from Hunger
- 1. "Fragile" Released: 10 December 2009; 2. "Tender" Released: 26 April 2010; 3. "Ungrateful" Released: 4 October 2010; 4. "Hunger" Released: 14 February 2011; 5. "That Postcard" Released: 9 May 2011

Hunger is the first album released by Sunderland indie band Frankie & The Heartstrings. It was released on 21 February 2011 on the band's own label, Pop Sex Ltd., a subsidiary of Wichita Recordings. A live version of the album was available to redeem online when bought from HMV. The album, produced by Orange Juice's Edwyn Collins, was recorded at his West Heath Studios, in London.

The chorus from single 'Hunger' was used in a TV advert for Domino's Pizza.

== Track listing ==
No.	Title	Length
1.	"Photograph"	3:01
2.	"Ungrateful"	3:59
3.	"Hunger"	2:56
4.	"Possibilities"	1:37
5.	"Fragile"	6:05
6.	"Tender"	3:00
7.	"That Postcard"	2:43
8.	"It's Obvious"	2:37
9.	"Want You Back"	3:02
10.	"Don't Look Surprised"	5:44

iTunes bonus tracks
No.	Title	Length
11.	"Young Again"	2:19

== Reception ==
Professional ratings
Review scores
Source	Rating
Drowned In Sound	6/10
The Guardian	3/5 stars
NME	4/5 stars

The album received favourable reviews from critics, with Lisa Wright of NME Magazine, stating '‘Hunger’ will, like all great albums, undoubtedly polarise opinions, but take Frankie to your hearts and it'll swallow you whole'. The Guardian said of the album that it is 'a tonic for winter-dulled spirits.'
