= Christopher Bucklow =

British photographer (born 1957)

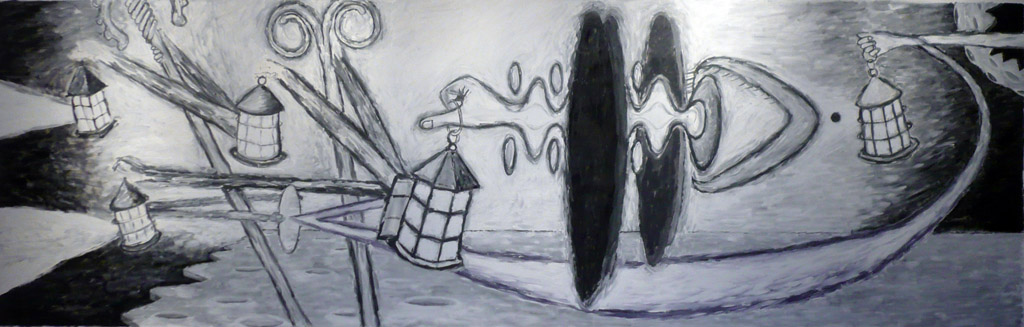
The Mirror and the Lamp, 2008 by Bucklow

Christopher Bucklow (born 1957) is a British artist and art-historian. His work has been exhibited internationally and is held in numerous public collections including the Guggenheim Museum, Museum of Modern Art (MoMA), Museum of Modern Art, San Francisco (SFMoMA), and The Metropolitan Museum of Art among others. He has received residencies at The British Museum, London, the Banff Center for the Arts, Alberta, and The Centre for Studies in British Romanticism, Grasmere. Bucklow is best known for his ongoing photographic series Guests (1993–present) and his improvisational paintings from the series To Reach Inside A Vault (2006–present). He is the author of numerous books and essays including The Sea of Time and Space (Wordsworth Trust, 2004), "This is Personal: Blake and Mental Fight" in Blake & Sons, Lifestyles and Mysticism in Contemporary Art (University College, Cork, 2005), What is in the Dwat: The Universe of Guston's Final Decade (Wordsworth Trust, 2007), and the co-author of Bacon and the Mind: Art, Neuroscience and Psychology (Thames & Hudson, 2019).

== Life and work ==
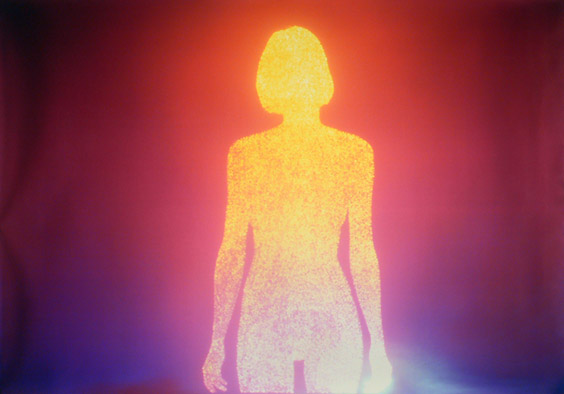
Color Photograph, 2009 by Bucklow

Bucklow was born in Flixton, Greater Manchester, England. He graduated with a degree in art history in 1978. Between 1978 and 1995 he worked as a curator in the Prints & Drawings Department at the Victoria & Albert Museum, London where he researched Romanticism, photography, and developed an interest in the work of William Blake (British, 1757 – 1827). An account of Bucklow's career as a curator and the forces that propelled his transition to art praxis can be found in "Rhetoric and Motive in the Writing of Art History: A Shapeshifter's Perspective" in Remaking Art History (Routledge, New York City; 2007).

Bucklow's early work (1989–91) was conceptual and sculptural, often taking the form of plant species that he altered genetically or grafted together. In the 1990s he created two bodies of photographic work, The Beauty of the World (1991) and Guest - also known as Tetrarchs, that were foundational for Britain's contemporary negative-less photography movement.

Guests was created using a 30 x 40-inch pinhole camera, built by Bucklow, with thousands of apertures to make unique cibachrome chromogenic prints. Tetrarchs were created using either a 40 x 60-inch camera, or one with a 40 x 100 inches plate size. Guest (1993–present) features silhouettes of persons that appear to the artist in dreams. Friends, family, and fellow artists like Matthew Barney and Adam Fuss are featured individually in the work as a collective of figures drawn by the multiple solar images directed through the 25,000 apertures in Bucklow's camera.

His interest in personal mythology, Jungian dream psychology, metaphor and the use of personification was continued in his subsequent paintings. To Reach Inside A Vault is a series of large scale improvisational paintings in which a commedia dell'arte technique is used to generate the subjects or plot. These paintings were exhibited in Bucklow's 2017 retrospective Said Now, For All Time at the Southampton City Art Gallery, UK.

== Public collections ==
Museum of Modern Art, New York

Metropolitan Museum of Art

Solomon R. Guggenheim Museum

Museum of Fine Arts, Houston

Modern Art Museum of Fort Worth

Dallas Museum of Art

Victoria & Albert Museum

The Wordsworth Trust, Grasmere

Honolulu Museum of Art

Herzliya Museum of Art

High Museum of Art

Museum of Fine Arts, Boston

Blanton Museum of Art,

Cleveland Museum of Art

Yale Center for British Art

Norton Museum, Palm Beach

Perez Art Museum Miami

San Francisco Museum of Modern Art

Los Angeles County Museum of Art

== Publications ==
- Bucklow, Christopher. 'The Lens Within the Heart' in Martin Harrison (ed.) Bacon and the Mind: Art, Neuroscience and Psychology, The Estate of Francis Bacon & Thames & Hudson, London, 2019. ISBN 978-0-500-97097-3. LCCN 2018-966029 (A study of psychological sources of Francis Bacon's imagery).
- Bucklow, Christopher. Nantucket Sleighride, Southampton City Art Gallery & Ball Press, 2017. ISBN 978-0-9929938-4-9. (A study of the iconography of dreams).
- Bucklow, Christopher. Life on Mars, Southampton City Art Gallery & Ball Press, 2017. ISBN 978-0-9929938-3-2 (A study of the generative phases leading to the creation of artworks).
- Bucklow, Christopher. 'The Child Comes as Softly as Snow', essay in Adam Fuss, Catalogue, Fundacion Mapfre, Madrid, 2011, pp. 159–171. ISBN 978-84-9844-278-6 (An iconographical study of the myths underlying Fuss' work).
- Bucklow, Christopher. 'St John's Apocalypse: Revelation, Resurrection, Rhetoric', essay in Signs of the Apocalypse/Rapture, Front Forty Press, Chicago, 2008, n.p. ISBN 978-0-9778689-6-4 (An essay on dreaming and the personal motives of prophets).
- Bucklow, Christopher. What is in the Dwat, The Universe of Philip Guston's Final Decade, Wordsworth Trust. 1 June 2007. ISBN 1-905256-21-3 (An iconographical study of Guston's late work).
- Bucklow, Christopher. 'Rhetoric and Motive in Writing Art History: a Shape Shifter's Perspective', in Elizabeth C. Mansfield (ed.), Making Art History, Routledge, New York, 2007. ISBN 0-41537234-8 (An essay on the personal motives of art historians).
- Bucklow, Christopher. 'This is Personal: Blake and Mental Fight', in Blake & Sons, Lifestyles and Mysticism in Contemporary Art, University College, Cork, 2005 pp. 131 – 139. ISBN 0 9502440 9 0 (An essay on the many versions of 'Blake' that scholars have created).
- Mellor and Hambourg, David Alan and Maria Morris. Christopher Bucklow: Guest, Blindspot Publications, New York, October 2004. Essays by David Alan Mellor and Maria Morris Hambourg. 50 colour plates.
- Bucklow, Christopher. 'William Blake: The Sea of Time and Space', If This Be Not I, The British Museum and the Wordsworth Trust, 2004, pp. 115–120. ISBN 1 870787 95 1 (An essay on William Blake and the invention of religion).
- If This Be Not I, British Museum and The Wordsworth Trust, 2004 (book). Essays by Marina Warner, Adam Phillips, Roger Malbert, Introduction by James Putnam.
- Bucklow, Christopher. Seven Beginnings to Guest, Artereal Gallery, Sydney, Australia, 2006 (Catalogue contains seven accounts of the possible genesis of the series).

== Monographs ==
- 2017 Alex Faulkner et al. Said Now, For All Time, Southampton City Art Gallery. Preface by Martin Harrison.
- 2015 Alex Faulkner and Christopher Bucklow, Dimitri & Wenlop, Upton Noble, Ball Press, ISBN 978 0 9929938 1 8.
- 2004 Prof David Alan Mellor et al. Christopher Bucklow: Guest, Blindspot Publications, New York.
- 2004 Marina Warner et al. If This Be Not I, British Museum, London & Wordsworth Trust, Grasmere, ISBN 1 870787 95 1 With an interview by Adam Philips.
