= Stay (Bernard Butler song) =

Single by Bernard Butler

from the album People Move On
- Released: 5 January 1998
- Recorded: 1997
- Genre: Britpop
- Length: 5:15
- Label: Creation
- Songwriter(s): Bernard Butler
- Producer(s): Bernard Butler

Bernard Butler singles chronology
"Stay" (1998)	"Not Alone" (1998)

"Stay" is the debut single from Bernard Butler released in January 1998. It is the lead single taken from the album People Move On and charted at number 12 on the UK Singles Chart.

== Background ==
The song begins with a gentle acoustic guitar, which leads into Butler's vocals. Drums, electric guitar, keyboards and backing vocals all get introduced gradually, before coming together in one last climax and quiet coda. Butler has said that "Stay" is not a love song but a song about change. "The process of change is hard but you've got to do it. It's about when you know you've got to do something but there's an element of risk. It's about when I first went to France to record. A lot of the lyrics come from a conversation with Elisa, my wife. I wrote them on the train over to France."

The music video for the title song was directed by David Mould, whose directing credits include Suede's "Trash", the first single released after Butler's departure. B-side "Hotel Splendide" features backing vocals from Edwyn Collins.

== Critical reception ==
Reception to Butler's debut single was very positive. Ned Raggett of AllMusic wrote: "The title track is one of the more self-consciously grandiose things out there, but its big advantage is that it builds rather than overwhelms." Select praised the song's composition, writing: "a classic rock collage: descending chords a la "Dear Prudence", "Whatever", "The Changingman", an impassioned middle eight that sounds almost gospel-esque, a huge arrangement, and plaintive lyrics, sufficiently simple to need no deciphering whatsoever." Music Week awarded it 'Single of the Week', writing: "This dreamy and delicious keyboard-led solo debut by the former Suede guitarist and McAlmont collaborator proves his ability not only to write songs but also to sing them."

Caspar Llewellyn Smith of The Daily Telegraph called the song "epic stuff, progressing from acoustic balladry to a monumental wall of sound." He felt that the song "abandons the traditional verse-chorus-verse structure that established Suede as early Britpop frontrunners, but the tension between the layers of guitar effects and a simple piano motif gives the song its own dynamism." British music charts commentator James Masterton wrote: "The quality of the record is undeniable even if he will forever be more famous for his guitar playing than his singing. Sounding like a close relation of George Michael's Praying For Time, the single builds up into a dramatic climax that borders on the epic. Easily one of the most outstanding singles of the year to date (and even after three weeks that is no idle claim)."

The single charted at number 12 on the UK Singles Chart, selling 60,000 copies.

== Single track listings ==
No.	Title	Length
1.	"Stay"	5:23
2.	"Hotel Splendide"	5:49
3.	"The Sea"	4:51
