= Hopper (band) =

English indie rock band

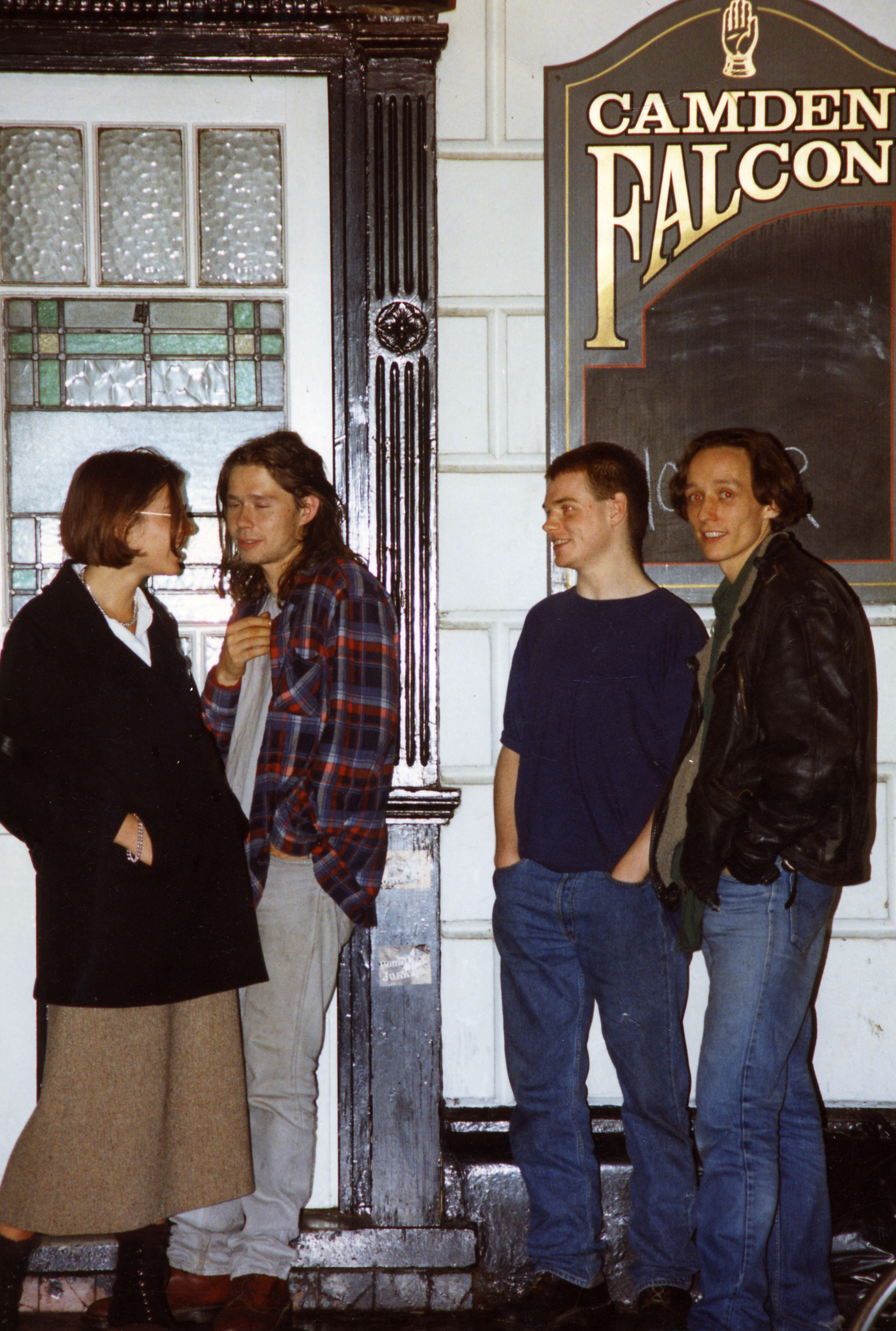
- L-R: Rachel Morris, Paul Shepherd, Mark Blackmore, Chris Bowers

Background information
- Origin: London, England, United Kingdom
- Genres: indie rock
- Years active: 1992–1998
- Labels: Damaged Goods; Factory Too
- Members: Rachel Morris (vocals); Paul Shepperd (guitar); Chris Bowers (bass); Matt Alexander (drums)
- Past members: Mark Blackmore (drums) Wayne Berger (guitar)

Hopper were an English indie rock band formed in 1992.

They first signed to Damaged Goods (the label that released the Manic Street Preachers' first official single). Their debut single was "Hunter" released on 31 January 1994. Their second, "Baby Oil Applicator" created more of a buzz and Steve Lamacq made it his single of the week on Radio 1.

They signed to Factory Too, the new label of Tony Wilson, after the demise of Factory Records. They recorded their debut album English and French (originally entitled Cause I Rock), produced by Bernard Butler after he left Suede. The record was engineered by Nigel Godrich after working on Radiohead's The Bends. The album was released during the peak of Britpop, which caused inevitable comparisons to other English female-fronted bands of the time such as Sleeper, who were frequently slated by music papers such as NME and Melody Maker.

Singles released off the album included "Bad Kid" and "Wasted," which were melodic pop punk anthems; they did well on the UK indie charts, but did not enjoy the mainstream success of other guitar bands of the time. Other singles were "Ridiculous Day" and "Oh my Heartless," which were acoustic-driven and mellower. This was more typical of the album as a whole, though the songs would tend to build towards the end.

Rachel Morris was frequently commended for her unconventional singing style. She would often emphasise different parts of lines when they are repeated in the songs.

After touring and promoting the album and its singles for eighteen months, the band split in 1998. Rachel Ratajski (Morris) continued in music, working on a solo project under the name Rachel Kyriaki. It was reported on 28 February 2022 that she had died from unspecified causes.

== Discography ==
=== Album ===
- English and French (1996) Factory Too

=== EP ===
- Baby Oil Applicator (1994) Damaged Goods

=== Singles ===
- "Hunter" (1994) Damaged Goods
- "Wasted" (1995) Factory Too
- "Ridiculous Day" (1996) Factory Too
- "Bad Kid" (1996) Factory Too
- "Oh My Heartless" (1997) Factory Too
