= RockNess 2011 =

Music festival in Scotland

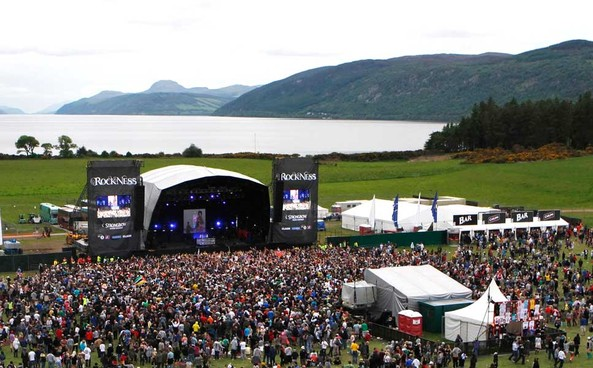
- View of the Main Stage at the 2011 Event
- Genre: Festival
- Date: 10–12 June
- Locations: Clunes Farm, Dores, Scotland, United Kingdom
- Country: Scotland
- Previous event: RockNess 2010
- Next event: RockNess 2012
- Attendance: ~35,000

RockNess 2011 was the sixth RockNess Festival to take place. It took place on 10–12 June 2011. On 12 October 2010, it was announced that a limited number of early bird tickets, priced at £99 including camping, would be sold from 28 October. All 3000 tickets were sold on the morning of the launch, causing organisers to bring forward a second early bird offer of £135, including weekend camping and bus travel from a number of cities across the United Kingdom. Student and payment plan tickets were also made available.

On 24 November 2010, the festival's first headline act was announced as The Chemical Brothers. Confirmed to headline the Saturday of the festival, organisers revealed the act through the festival's Twitter account. Friday night headliners Kasabian and Sunday night headliner Paolo Nutini were revealed on 25 November and 26 November, respectively, with full priced weekend camping tickets also going on sale.

25 additions were made to the line-up on 24 February 2011, with organiser Jim King revealing that the festival had sold ten times as many tickets as the same point from the previous year. Further announcements took place between March and May. Two new arenas were announced for the 2011 event, including the Sub Club Sound System, and the Rock N Roll Circus. On 19 May 2011, festival organisers announced the Official RockNess Guide. The guide including important festival information, ones to watch lists and stage splits.

== Line-up ==
| Friday 10 June | Saturday 11 June | Sunday 12 June |
Main Stage
| Kasabian; Two Door Cinema Club; Zane Lowe; Brother; Morning Parade | The Chemical Brothers; Example; Magnetic Man; Laidback Luke; Annie Mac; DJ Yoda; The Japanese Popstars | Paolo Nutini; Glasvegas; The Wombats; We Are Scientists; Lissie; The Twilight Sad; The Boxer Rebellion |
Goldenvoice Arena
| Groove Armada; DJ Shadow; Mark Ronson (DJ set); Katy B; Nero; Skrillex | The Cribs; Frightened Rabbit; Bombay Bicycle Club; Sons and Daughters; Broken Records; Chapel Club; The Jim Jones Revue; Sound of Guns; Dog Is Dead; Funeral Suits | Boys Noize; Simian Mobile Disco; Sub Focus; Fake Blood; Beardyman; Rob da Bank; Niki & the Dove; Zedd |
Rock N Roll Circus
| Yasmin; D/R/U/G/S; The Sound of Arrows; Saint Saviour; Losers; Worship | Jamie Woon; Wolf Gang; Emeli Sandé; The Good Natured; Yaaks; Visions of Trees; Tom Odell | Smoke Fairies; Sparrow and the Workshop; Boy & Bear; Lucy Rose; Story Books; Hoodlums; Pete Roe; Mike Dignam |
Arcadia Afterburner
| Soma Present Pressure | Soma 20th Birthday Party | Soma Present Sunday Circus |
| Erol Alkan; Paul Ritch; Heidi; Ewan Pearson | Pan-Pot; Funk D'Void; Alex Under; Gary Beck; Master H; Mark Henning | Derrick Carter; Andrew Weatherall; Jamie Jones; Sunday Circus |
Sub Club Sound System
| Modeselektor; Jackmaster; Clouds; Hahaha; Boom Monk Ben | Magda; Raresh; Harri & Domenic; Sensu | Jamie xx; Matthew Dear; Optimo; Pro Vinylist Karim; David Barbarossa |
Bacardi Get Together
| Hervé; The Glimmers; Disco Bloodbath; Retro/Grade; Tom Staar; Psychmagik; Stripes; Kiwi | Alex Metric; Alan Braxe; Grum; Starsmith; Russ Chimes; Special Guests; Bicep DJs; Kiwi; Stripes | Special Guests; The Magician; Crystal Fighters (DJ set); The C90s; Stopmakingme; Casper C; Stripes; Kiwi |
Drambuie Charlies Bar
| Jeremy Nash; Tayo; Christian Stevenson; Jamie Cruisey | Jeremy Nash; Tayo; Christian Stevenson; Jamie Cruisey | Jeremy Nash; Tayo; Christian Stevenson; Jamie Cruisey |
VIP Clash Arena
| Ado; Radio Magnetic DJs; Is_Kill; Clash DJs | Mixed Bizness; Takeover; Clouds; Boom Monk Ben; Hahaha; Vitamins; Clash DJs | Lonely Hertz Club DJs; Hum & Haw Records DJs; Electric Eliminators; Billy Woods; Clash DJs |

Still to be announced is the Sound City Stage, a new stage at the festival in partnership with Liverpool Sound City, featuring a further twenty artists and DJs selected through a talent competition. The festival will also feature a comedy tent, headlined by Ian Cognito, Sean Hughes and Daniel Sloss alongside other comedians.
