= RockNess 2010 =

Music festival in Scotland

- Genre: Festival
- Date: 11–13 June
- Locations: Clunes Farm, Dores, Scotland, United Kingdom
- Country: Scotland
- Previous event: RockNess 2009
- Next event: RockNess 2011
- Attendance: ~35,000

RockNess 2010 was the fifth RockNess Festival which took place in Dores, Scotland, from 11–13 June 2010.

== Line-up ==
The line-up was as follows.

Mainstage
Friday	Saturday	Sunday
Fatboy Slim; Friendly Fires; Crystal Castles	Leftfield; Ian Brown; Soulwax; Plan B; Alabama 3; The Cuban Brothers; Hip Parade; The Coronas	The Strokes; Vampire Weekend; Doves; Blondie; The Maccabees; Dananananaykroyd; Pearl and the Puppets

Clash Presents...
Goldenvoice Arena	Goldenvoice Arena	Sunday Best Arena
Friday	Saturday	Sunday
Pendulum; Enter Shikari; Booka shade; Canterbury	Aphex Twin; Tinie Tempah; Zane Lowe; Aeroplane; Killa Kella; Burn; Dan Le Sac vs Scroobius Pip	Chase & Status; Dave Clarke; Bloody Beetroots; Hadouken!; Rob Da Bank; David E Sugar; Steve Mason

Annie Mac Presents...	Radio Soulwax
Saturday	Sunday
Annie Mac; Club 75 (Xavier de Rosnay of Justice, Cassius, DJ Mehdi & Busy P); Boys Noize	2manydjs; Vitalic; The Japanese Popstars; Kids on Bridges

Arcadia Afterburner
Sub Club Presents...	Soma Records Presents...	
Friday	Saturday	Sunday
Optimo; Subculture; Sensu	Green Velvet; Silicone Soul; Fergie; Gary Beck; Edit Select; Vector Lovers	RockNess Closing Party

Howard's End Pub
Friday	Saturday	Sunday
A welcome with Howard Marks	Marty Mclean; Scott Agnew; Papa CJ; Chris Cox; Mikey Adams	Scott Agnew; Marty Mclean; Papa CJ; Chris Cox; Tiernan Douieb; Mikey Adams

Strongbow Tent
Friday	Saturday	Sunday
High Contrast; A Skills; Fridge Magnets; Luca; Any Colour Black; PMCQ; The Raysummers; Monochrome	Freestylers; Goldierocks; Boom Monk Ben; Petebox; B-Tone; Tango in the Attic; Craig Mcgee; Starsmith; French Wives; General Jimmy	Norman Jay; Barry Ashworth; Fenech Soler; Benji Boko; Vendor Defendor; General Jimmy; Kid Adrift; PMCQ; Admiral Fallow; B-Tone; Abandoman; Craig Mcgee

GoNorth Tent
Friday	Saturday	Sunday
	Fartbarf	
