= RockNess 2012 =

Rock Music Festival

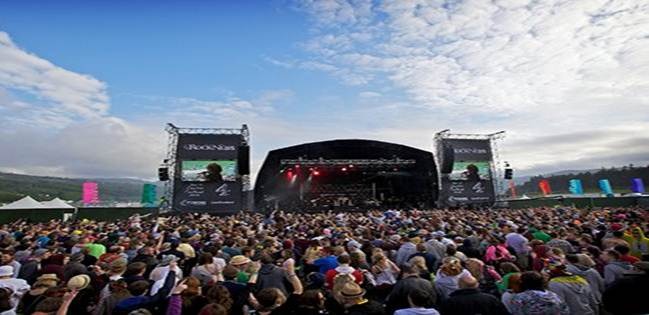
- View of the Main Stage at the 2012 Event
- Genre: Festival
- Date: 8–10 June
- Locations: Clunes Farm, Dores, Scotland, United Kingdom
- Country: Scotland
- Previous event: RockNess 2011
- Next event: RockNess 2013
- Attendance: ~35,000

RockNess 2012 was the seventh RockNess Festival to take place. It took place between 8–10 June 2012. On 5 July 2011 it was announced that the first 3000 people to complete an online survey on the 2011 event would be guaranteed to get their 2012 weekend tickets for a special £99 launch price. Due to an overwhelming response the offer was opened up to everyone and a limited amount of earlybird tickets were made available through the official website for £99 or in three installments of £33. On 3 October 2011 at 9 am the earlybird ticket offer ended, ticket prices were increased to an interim price of £125. The lineup for the 2012 event was announced on 26 January 2012. Volunteering was available at RockNess through 'Festival Volunteer'.

== Line-up ==
Friday 8 June	Saturday 9 June	Sunday 10 June
Main Stage
Mumford & Sons; Noah and the Whale; The Drums; Mystery Jets; Admiral Fallow	Deadmau5; Annie Mac; DJ Fresh Presents Fresh/Live; Beardyman; Olympic Torch Ceremony; The Rapture; Porter Robinson; People, Places, Maps	Biffy Clyro; Zane Lowe; Friendly Fires; Chic ft. Nile Rodgers; Kassidy; Sunday Service with The Cuban Brothers; Little Comets; So Many Animal Calls
Goldenvoice Arena
Étienne de Crécy; Ed Sheeran; Wretch 32; The Correspondents; The Internet	Riton; Justice; Busy P; Jacques Lu Cont; Madeon; Gesaffelstein; Japanese Popstars; Tim Minchin; Daniel Sloss; MC Billy Kirkwood	Rob Da Bank; Knife Party; Metronomy; Death in Vegas; Totally Enormous Extinct Dinosaurs; Jakwob
Clash Presents Sub Club Sound System
Eats Everything; Hudson Mohawke; Pearson Sound aka Ramadanman; Auntie Flo; Boom Monk Ben; Ryan Cass	Sub Club Sound System Presents: Harri & Domenic; Levon Vincent; Ivan Smagghe; Sensu; Thunder Disco Club; Clash: The View (Set Abandoned for Safety Reasons); The Pigeon Detectives; Guillemots; Lucy Rose; Sound of Guns; Random Impulse	Sub Club Sound System Presents: Jeff Mills; Clash: The View (Rescheduled slot); Ash; The Rifles; Errors; To Kill a King; All the Young; Gun; The Draymin; Kobi
Howards End in association with Sound City
RockNess Ceilidh All Stars; Theophilus London; Starboy Nathan; Homework; Team Kapowski; Whisky River Band; Comedy Lineup	Bearded Kitten; Bastille; Saint Saviour; Broken Hands; Red Kites; Comedy Lineup	RockNess Ceilidh All Stars; Stealing Sheep; Nina Nesbitt; Charlotte O'Connor; Iain McLaughlin & The Outsiders; Be Like Pablo; Comedy Lineup
Arcadia UFO Presents Soma Afterburner
Dave Clark; Claude VonStroke; Animal Farm	Ben Sims; James Holden; Silicone Soul; Andrew Weatherall & Sean Johnson Present 'A Love from Outer Space'	Mylo; Yuksek; Tiger and Woods; Phat Phil Cooper; Kottis
Kopparberg Kube
Filth DJs; Polymath; Count Clockwork; Russ Cuban	Bigfoot's Tea Party; WiLDKATS; Fuad; Krazzy Martin; Phat Phil Cooper; Boom Monk Ben	Dema; S Type; The Blessings; Dema; Barry Ashworth; Boom Monk Ben
