= Yaak =

Yaak may refer to:

People:

- Yaak Karsunke (1934–2025), German author and actor
- Yaak Uudmae (born 1954), Estonian triple jumper and long jumper, 1980 Olympic gold medallist

Locations:

- Yaak, Montana, unincorporated town in Lincoln County, Montana, United States
- Yaak River, tributary of the Kootenay River in Montana, USA and British Columbia, Canada
- Yaak Air Force Station, closed United States Air Force General Surveillance Radar station

== See also ==
- Yaaks
- Yaaku (disambiguation)
- Yak
