= RockNess 2013 =

Music festival in Dores, Scotland

- Genre: Festival
- Date: 7–9 June
- Locations: Clunes Farm, Dores, Scotland, United Kingdom
- Country: Scotland
- Previous event: RockNess 2012
- Attendance: ~35,000

RockNess 2013 was the eighth RockNess Festival to take place. It was confirmed by organisers via social media on 24 December 2012 and took place on the weekend of 7–9 June 2013.

On 18 January 2013 organisers announced the addition of a loch side camping area to the festival site.

A limited number of £99 earlybird tickets were released on 28 January 2013 which sold out within minutes, the tier-2 £129 tickets were released the same morning which then in turn quickly sold out.

== Line-up ==
Line-up as of 7 June 2013:

Friday 7 June	Saturday 8 June	Sunday 9 June
Main Stage
Basement Jaxx; The Vaccines; Ellie Goulding	Example; Very Special Guest Fatboy Slim; Skream & Benga; Steve Aoki; DJ Yoda (Replacing The Cuban Brothers); Monsta	Plan B; Madeon; Madness; The Temper Trap; The Futureheads; Alabama 3; Fatherson
Goldenvoice Arena
The Maccabees; Jessie Ware; Above & Beyond; Alex Metric; Mat Zo; Redlight	Bombay Bicycle Club; Newton Faulkner; Benjamin Francis Leftwich; Dog Is Dead; Zebra Katz	Ben Howard; Camera Obscura; Lianne La Havas; Reverend & The Makers; The Correspondents; Mikill Pane
Soma Arcadia Armadillo Arena
Len Faki; Pan-Pot; Gary Beck; Hans Bouffmyhre	Joris Voorn; Harvey McKay; Clouds; Animal Farm	Josh Wink; Nic Fanciulli; Mark Henning; Vector Lovers
Black Isle Pub
London Grammar; The Boy Who Trapped The Sun; The Ramona Flowers; The Little Mill Of Happiness	Public Service Broadcasting; Jacob Banks; Niteworks	Filth DJ's; Them & Us; Toby Michaels Rolling Damned; Jemma Tweedie; Olivia Sebastianelli
Sub Club Sound System
Kerri Chandler; Julio Bashmore; Jackmaster; Huxley; Beta & Kappa (I Am)	Carl Craig; Harri & Domenic; Henrik Schwarz (Live); Scuba; Guy Gerber (Live); Sensu; Watch The Duck	
Snafu Presents
	Fenech-Soler; Hernan Cattaneo; Mimosa; Bigfoot's Tea Party	
Red Bull Studios Takeover
		Booka Shade; Netsky (Live); Jaguar Skills; Bobby Tank; Proxy; Karma Kid; Friend Within
