= Kieran Smith (disambiguation) =

Kieran Smith is an American Olympic swimmer.

Kieran Smith may also refer to:

- Kieran Smith, see Indoor hockey at the 2007 Asian Indoor Games
- Kieran Smith (boxer), see Boxing at the 2011 Commonwealth Youth Games
- Kieran Smith, musician in You and What Army
