= RockNess 2009 =

Music festival in Scotland

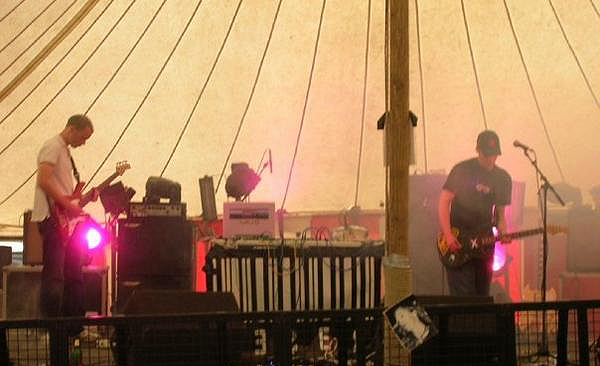
- Keser performing at RockNess 2009 Festival
- Genre: Festival
- Date: 12–14 June
- Locations: Clunes Farm, Dores, Scotland, United Kingdom
- Country: Scotland
- Previous event: RockNess 2008
- Next event: RockNess 2010
- Attendance: ~35,000

RockNess 2009 was the fourth RockNess Festival to take place. It took place on the 12th, 13th and 14 June 2009 with for the first time acts playing on the Friday. The headlining acts were The Flaming Lips, The Prodigy, Biffy Clyro, Basement Jaxx, Dizzee Rascal, Orbital and Placebo.

The RockNess organisers held a DJ competition throughout Scotland to find new DJ talent. Heats were held across the country with final being held in Glasgow. The winner was 19-year-old Fuad from Aberdeen played just before Pete Tong on the 13th. There were also 2 runners up.

The line-up was as follows.

Mainstage
Friday	Saturday	Sunday
Flaming Lips; The Aliens	Basement Jaxx; Dizzee Rascal; David Guetta; Just Jack; Cagedbaby; Sneaky Sound System; Tommy Sparks; Chew Lips	The Prodigy; Biffy Clyro; The Wombats; The Cuban Brothers; Tommy Reilly; Baddies; Official Secrets Act

Clash presents Wonderland / Clash Arena
Saturday	Sunday
Orbital; Pete Tong; Crookers; Annie Mac; DJ Yoda; Jaymo & Andy George; Brodinski	Placebo; Soulwax; Pendulum & MC Jakes; Layo & Bushwacka; Chase & Status & MC Rage; Scratch Perverts; The Whip; Japanese Popstars

Fat Sams / Rob Da Bank present Sunday Best
Saturday	Sunday
Super Furry Animals; Alabama 3; Frightened Rabbit; Blood Red Shoes; Magistrates; Detroit Social Club; Wave Machines	Erol Alkan; Dubfire; Mylo; James Murphy & Pat Mahoney (LCD Soundsystem); Zane Lowe; Kissy Sell Out; The Count & Sinden

Soco Social
Friday	Saturday	Sunday
Dub Pistols; Cagedbaby; Killer Kitsch; Clancy; Giles Looker	Mylo; Filthy Dukes; Alex Metric; Infadels; Living in a Disco; Firas	James Murphy & Pat Mahoney (LCD Soundsystem); Yousef; Leatherhead; Hervé

Rizla Arena
Friday	Saturday	Sunday
Jazzie B; The Revenge; Autodisco; Heavenly Dukebox	Furry Sounds (Super Furry Animals); Maelstrom; Den Haan; Steve Mason; Mike Oman	Andrew Weatherall; Riton; Jon Carter; Toddla T & MC Seroce; Heavenly Jukebox vs. Disco Deviance; David Shrigley

Bollywood Skinny presents Soma Records / Ed Banger Records / Sub Club Party
Friday	Saturday	Sunday
Funk D‘Void; The Black Dog; Mark Henning; Octogen; Mr Copy; Harvey Mckay; Decimal	Busy P; DJ Mehdi; DJ Feadz; Krazy Baldhead	Subculture ft. Harri, Domenic & Telford; Optimo; Sensu; Cotton Cake; Jackmaster; Kinky Afro ft. Mafro; Hyp? ft. Boom Monk Ben

Wrongness
Friday

RockNess Ceilidh Allstars

The following acts also played across the weekend on the ‘goNORTH’ stage: Alex Cornish, Barn Owel, Bronto Skylift, Call To Mind, Casiokids, Cast of the Capital, Colour-Coded, Come On Bang!, Daily Bread, Dotjr, The French Wives, Hey Enemy, Jack Butler, Keser, Mitchell Museum, Nacional, Our Lunar Activities, Pooch, Strawhouses, Spyamp, St Deluxe, Team William, Theatre Fall, The Naked Strangers, The Ray Summers, Tone, Trapped in Kansas, Vcheka, We See Lights and Yaweh.
