= RockNess 2007 =

Music festival in Scotland

- A View of RockNess at the 2007 event
- Genre: Festival
- Date: 9–10 June
- Locations: Clunes Farm, Dores, Scotland, United Kingdom
- Country: Scotland
- Previous event: RockNess 2006
- Next event: RockNess 2008
- Attendance: ~35,000

RockNess 2007 was the second RockNess Festival to take place. the festival was increased to two days, had additional stages and capacity was increased to 35,000. Headlining on Saturday were the Chemical Brothers, while Sunday was headlined by Manic Street Preachers on the main stage and Daft Punk in the Clash Arena. Other notable acts included The Charlatans, Groove Armada, The Feeling, and Soulwax playing Nite Versions.

Daft Punk were much more popular than expected and the 10,000 person Clash tent was soon filled, the sides were removed by organisers to allow a reported 30,000 people to see the set. In addition the Daft Punk set was initially held up by nearly an hour due to lighting problems. Daft Punk responded to this by playing an uncharacteristic 10-minute encore, as found on the Alive 2007 album.

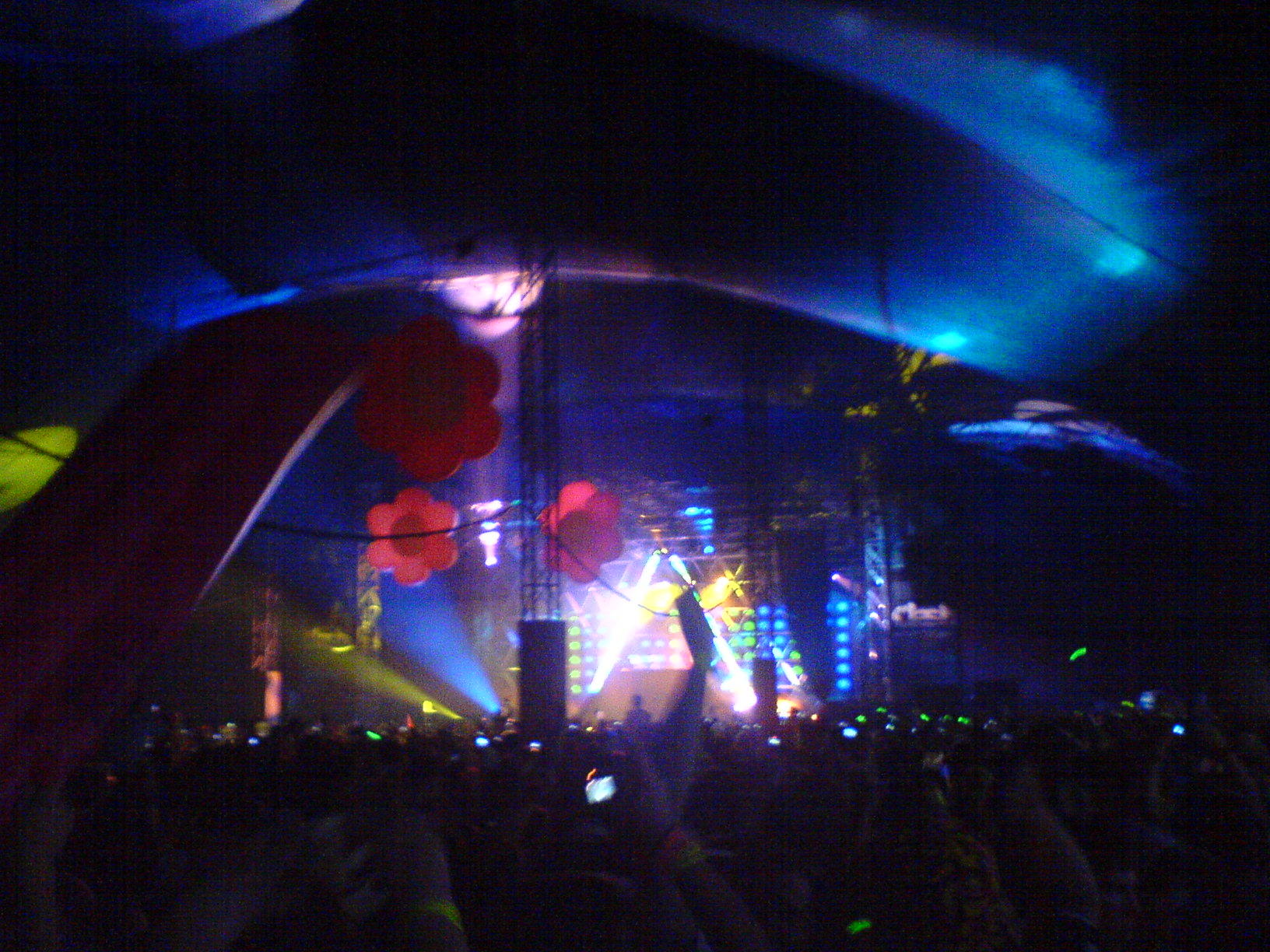
Daft Punk performing at the RockNess 2007 festival.

The festival management were criticised for their decision to place Daft Punk in the 10,000 capacity Clash Arena instead of the mainstage. The festival was Daft Punks first Scottish show in over 10 years which made the set a "must see" for many of the 35,000 festival goers.

There was also some controversy with the death of one festival goer from taking an overdose of heroin in the car park outside the main arena and camp site.

Professional footballer Richie Hart who plays for Inverness Caledonian Thistle was detained in connection with possession of cocaine on the banks of Loch Ness at the 2007 festival. He admitted to the charge of possessing cocaine and was fined £300.

== Line-up ==
The line-up was as follows.

Main Stage
| Saturday | Sunday |
| The Chemical Brothers; The Charlatans; Kelis; The Cuban Brothers; The Wombats; The Whip; XX Teens | Manic Street Preachers; The Feeling; The Automatic; The Levellers; The Draytons; Drive-By Argument; 1990s |

Clash Areana
| Saturday | Sunday |
| Groove Armada; Alabama 3; Cagedbaby; The Elektrons; Freeform Five | Daft Punk; Soulwax Nite Versions; Mark Ronson; Dub Pistols; Trabant; Man Like Me; Shitdisco |

Radio Soulwax Arena / Sunday Best Arena
| Saturday | Sunday |
| 2manydjs; Erol Alkan; DJ Yoda; Tim Deluxe; Nathan Detroit; Leatherhead | Rob Da Bank; Yousef; Kissy Sell Out; Optimo; Filthy Dukes |
