= Autumn In Disguise =

Scottish rock band

- Origin: Aberdeen, Scotland, United Kingdom
- Years active: 2010–2013
- Labels: Unsigned
- Members: Mike Hendo; Stephen Napier; Scott Low; James Forbes
- Past members: Aaron Robertson; Ben Greig; Ross Gordon; Louis Craighead

Autumn In Disguise were a Scottish rock band formed in Aberdeen in early 2010. Originally a five-member band they started playing shows in March 2010. They released their first song, a cover of Lady Gaga's "Bad Romance", for free on the group's Bandcamp, before adding a second vocalist. They went on to release their debut EP See Me In Terror on September 1, 2010, along with a music video for the song of the same name.

The band spent much of their time touring Scotland. In 2011, the band stumbled across Red Bull's Bedroom Jam competition, which encouraged fans to vote for their favourite band. After performing live on the site, the band were voted as one of the eight contestants who would be getting to play T In The Park, Sonisphere, Download Festival, Hevy Festival and Underage Festival. The band were eliminated from the competition after the festivals while Page 44 went on to win.

In May 2011, the band unveiled their new image with "Let's Call This A Home Run", a song that premiered on Rocksound's website.

The same year the band released their mini-album What Makes Life Better. Some tracks from the LP were debuted on the Aberdeen leg of their UK tour in October 2011.

The band played the main stage at Hit The Deck Festival at Nottingham's Rock City in April 2012, with bands such as Kids In Glass Houses, Deaf Havana, Lower Than Atlantis, We Are The In Crowd and Of Mice & Men.

The band have supported many established acts in the past two years, including Four Year Strong, Deaf Havana, Yashin, A Loss For Words, The Dangerous Summer and MXPX

As of 2013 they are defunct and their social media accounts have since disappeared.

As of 2020 they are still disbanded and have yet to reunite.

They're still missed by many in Aberdeen

== Discography ==
- See Me In Terror (2010)
- What Makes Life Better (2011)
