= Hevy Music Festival =

British rock festival

- Genre: Punk rock, alternative rock, hardcore punk, heavy metal
- Dates: first weekend in August
- Locations: Folkestone Seafront (2009); Port Lympne Wild Animal Park (2010–2015)
- Years active: 2008–2012, 2014–2015
- Website: www.hevy.co.uk

Hevy Music Festival was a rock festival established by Claire Baker and James Dutton that took place annually near Folkestone, Kent, in the UK. It was originally held on 1 August 2009 on Folkestone seafront as a one-day festival with Feeder, Gary Numan and Ash as headliners, with an unusual organisation between the two stages in which when one finished on the main stage, the band on the second stage would immediately begin their set. This stage looked like a burger van. In 2010 it moved to Port Lympne Wild Animal Park and grew to a weekend camping festival held from 6–8 August. The headline artists included Glassjaw, Gallows, Sepultura and the Subways, and the festival provided a variety of rock music genres including punk rock, alternative rock, hardcore punk and heavy metal along with extreme sports displays and state-of-the-art thrill rides.

== History ==
=== 2009 ===
Dates: 1 August 2009
Venue: Folkestone Seafront
Attendance: ~2000
Headline bands: Feeder, Gary Numan, Ash
Other bands: Attack! Attack!, The Blackout, Hundred Reasons, Cancer Bats, We Are the Ocean, The Ghost of a Thousand, Heartbreak, Sharks, In Case of Fire, Sonic Boom Six, Flood of Red, The Xcerts, Elephants, Lightsgoblue, Kingskin, One Day Elliott, Eleven Eleven, Amber Room, The Startover, After the Ordeal, More Than Normal, Farewell City, Mexico Fallz.

In spite of a freak storm which flattened the security fencing two days before and some torrential downpours on the day itself, the 2009 Hevy Music Festival was a resounding success. Feeder performed brand a new song from their album Renegades for the first time, with this one being "Sentimental", although the title track was soundchecked, it was not performed for the main show. Gary Numan performed a typically energetic set including the classics "Are 'Friends' Electric?" and "Cars". Rainwater damage to his guitar amplifier caused a delay which shortened the subsequent sets but all were completed before the 11 pm curfew.

=== 2010 ===
Dates: 6–8 August 2010
Venue: Port Lympne Wild Animal Park
Attendance: 3000
Glassjaw flew over from New York to make an exclusive UK appearance at the 2010 festival which was a larger event lasting over a weekend with onsite camping. The media response was very positive: "A stellar line up all around.....it'll be hard to see another festival match up in terms of experience and value this year." and "Innovative, fresh and dedicated festival.....putting on a joyous choice of alt music this summer."
The festival saw a fresh start, with new promoters, for live music at Port Lympne Wild Animal Park and is expected to continue to grow in future years. In the words of one reviewer: "From the triumph of this weekender, we expect an even better Hevy Festival (in) 2011."

Main Stage
Saturday	Sunday
Gallows; Comeback Kid; Fucked Up; Rolo Tomassi; Trash Talk; Dead Swans; TRC; Feed the Rhino	Glassjaw; The Subways; The King Blues; Madina Lake; Young Guns; Canterbury; Failsafe; Me Vs Hero

Rock Sound Stage
Saturday	Sunday
Dananananaykroyd; Sucioperro; Hexes; Pulled Apart by Horses; March of the Raptors; Turbowolf; Cerebral Ballzy; Eaststrikewest	Sepultura; Napalm Death; The Black Dahlia Murder; Despised Icon; Devil Sold His Soul; Sylosis; Bury Tomorrow; Chickenhawk

Red Bull Bedroom Jam Stage
Saturday	Sunday
Twin Atlantic; Deaf Havana; Outcry Collective; Blitz Kids; Hearts Under Fire; Heights; Never Means Maybe; Scared Betrayal	Polar Bear Club; The Plight; Lower Than Atlantis; Throats; You and What Army; No Mean City; Stand Up Guy; This Is Devine

Local Heroes Stage
Saturday	Sunday
Pay No Respect; Breaking the Day; Alaska; Still Dreaming; Santa Karla; Jairus; Take Courage; Predicting the Fall	The James Cleaver Quintet; Tyrannosaurus Alan; Bareface; Adelaide; Lost in Colour; Pharoahs; The Startover; As Worlds Collide

=== 2011 ===
Dates: 5–8 August 2011
Venue: Port Lympne Wild Animal Park
Attendance: 4000
Saturday headliners The Dillinger Escape Plan and Architects were announced in early March, along with 23 of the planned 80 bands across four stages. On 1 April the Sunday headliners were revealed to be pop punk heroes – Four Year Strong. They were joined by Welsh rockers Funeral for a Friend. Saturday's lineup additions included the last-ever show for The Ghost of a Thousand, who announced they were calling it a day after 7 years. In early May eight more bands were announced including Trash Talk who have risen to prominence following their first ever festival appearance at Hevy last year, although they pulled out at the last minute, with TRC and Feed the Rhino stepping in to perform mini-sets in Trash Talk's slot. Rot in Hell were forced to cancel due to the departure of vocalist Nathan Bean. Death Is Not Glamorous were originally booked to play the fest this year along with their tourmates in La Dispute and Touche Amore, although once they found out the festival was at an animal park they pulled out for ethical reasons (they are a Vegan band). Press reviews were universally positive; from Trebuchet magazine: "Hevy is the right sort of festival to really get into music. Talking to production staff, bands, bookers, punters and security there is a strong feeling of community amongst everyone that they are doing this because they love it. Long live Hevy fest see you next year!"

Jägermeister Main Stage
Friday	Saturday	Sunday
	The Dillinger Escape Plan; Architects; The Ghost of a Thousand; TRC; Feed the Rhino; The Carrier; November Coming Fire; Gold Kids; Hang the Bastard	Four Year Strong; Funeral for a Friend; We Are the Ocean; Zebrahead; Capdown; Polar Bear Club; Man Overboard; Hildamay

Rock Sound/Macbeth Stage
Friday	Saturday	Sunday
Sonic Boom Six; Flood of Red; Straight Lines; Steel Rules Die; The First; Turbogeist; The Bottlenex	The Bouncing Souls; Off! Title Fight; The Xcerts; Make Do and Mend; Me Vs Hero; Spy Catcher; Arcane Roots	The Bronx; Ceremony; Defeater; Strife; While She Sleeps; Touché Amoré; Bastions

etnies/FRONT Stage
Friday	Saturday	Sunday
Tek One; Lower Than Atlantis; Carcer City; Giants; Revoker; Basement; Crossbreaker; Departures; Harbours; Max Raptor	Rise to Remain; Awaken Demons; Brutality Will Prevail; All Teeth; Heart in Hand; Heart of a Coward; Grieved; Brotherhood of the Lake	Your Demise; Stick to Your Guns; More Than Life; La Dispute; Living With Lions; Paige; Marmozets; Loose Cannons

Red Bull Bedroom Jam Stage
Friday	Saturday	Sunday
Daniel P Carter; Don Broco; Lost Boys; You and What Army; Never Means Maybe	ACODA; The Ocean Between Us; Page 44; Floods; If Heroes Should Fail; Mishkin; Collapse the Control; Our People Versus Yours	Autumn In Disguise; Makethisrelate; Hill Valley High; The Hype Theory; The Headstart; The Debut; Show It Off; The Afterparty

=== 2012 ===
Dates: 3–6 August 2012
Venue: Port Lympne Wild Animal Park
Attendance: NA
The 2012 dates were announced on 2 December 2011, with the first announcement made on 27 January 2012 and the second on 16 March 2012.

The organisers of Hevy Music Festival decided in light of "temperamental" weather leading up to the festival they put roofs over the stages. This involved the Rock Sound Stage and the Punktastic Stage merge to have alternating bands meaning there is no time clashes between the two stages. They also merged the Punktastic Stage into the same roofed area with the two stages alternating as the "Main" Stage, while putting the Red Bull Bedroom Jam stage in its own distinct tent. Will Haven dropped out of the festival on Thursday 2 August and were not replaced. Instead all other bands had their sets adjusted to accommodate the space left by the group.

Main Stage
Friday (Rock Sound Stage)	Saturday (Punktastic Stage)	Sunday (Rock Sound Stage)
Deaf Havana; Lower Than Atlantis; Sharks; The James Cleaver Quintet; Marmozets; Mixtapes; Our Time Down Here; The Bots	Andrew W.K. Meshuggah; Municipal Waste; This Is Hell; Rolo Tomassi; Devil Sold His Soul; Bury Tomorrow; Feed the Rhino; The Safety Fire; Campus	Descendents; Madball; Hundred Reasons; H_{2}O; Ignite; 7 Seconds; Cruel Hand; Night Verses; Mallory Knox

Second Stage
Friday (Punktastic Stage)	Saturday (Rock Sound Stage)	Sunday (Punktastic Stage)
Deez Nuts; Trapped Under Ice; Reign Supreme; Bleed from Within; Last Witness; Blacklisters; Desolated; Gnarwolves	Glassjaw; Norma Jean; A Wilhelm Scream; Set Your Goals; Pianos Become the Teeth; Balance & Composure; Seahaven; Martyr Defiled; Crocus; The Social Club	Converge; Verse; The Chariot; Rise and Fall; Suis La Lune; Lewd Acts; Worms Feed; Attack! Vipers!

Red Bull Bedroom Jam Stage
Friday	Saturday	Sunday
Broken Teeth; Demoraliser; Napoleon; Brotherhood of the Lake; Grader; Acoda; Page 44; Never Means Maybe	Brutality Will Prevail; Eisberg; Landscapes; The Long Haul; Veils; Dead Harts; Golden Tanks; Adelaide; I Divide; Strangle Kojak	Vinnie Caruana; Lemuria; Listener; Hawk Eyes &U&I; Pacer; The Smoking Hearts; Reachback; Mechanical Smile; The Jellycats

=== 2013 ===
Dates: 2–5 August 2013 (Cancelled)
Venue: N/A
Attendance: N/A

Hevy Fest 2013 was announced on 4 January 2013, with the first band, Black Flag, announced on 25 January. 14 more bands were added to the bill on 1 March, including Hatebreed, Comeback Kid, Horse the Band and The Menzingers, and in April Killswitch Engage were announced as headliners. However the festival was eventually cancelled along with a planned replacement show at the Brixton Academy.

=== 2014 ===
Dates: 14–15 August 2014
Venue: Port Lympne Wild Animal Park
Attendance: N/A

Hevy Fest 2014 was announced on 30 April 2014, with the first twenty bands announced on the same day including Deez Nuts, Reel Big Fish, and Devil Sold His Soul. In all over 60 bands will be announced before the festival, including headliners across 3 stages.

=== 2015 ===
Dates: 14–15 August 2015
Venue: Port Lympne Wild Animal Park
Attendance: N/A

Hevy Fest 2015 was announced on 15 October 2014, with the first bands being announced on 18 December 2014. The festival headliners were announced on 22 February 2015, it was revealed Thrice would be headlining on the Saturday with Coheed & Cambria topping the bill on the Friday.

Main Stage
Friday	Saturday
Coheed and Cambria; The Dillinger Escape Plan; Protest the Hero; Touché Amoré; Hacktivist; Black Peaks; Chon; Continents	Thrice; The Get Up Kids; The Fall of Troy; Arcane Roots; As It Is; Fort Hope; Milk Teeth; Trash Boat

Second Stage
Friday	Saturday
Fightstar; Ignite; A Wilhelm Scream; Teenage Bottlerocket; Creeper; Youth Man; Press to Meco; Waster	Judge; Horse the Band; Sweet Jesus; Crooks; Broken Teeth; Blood Youth; Vales; Up River

Third Stage
Friday	Saturday
Stick to Your Guns; Betraying the Martyrs; Landscapes; Heck; Break Even; Endless Heights; Grader; Wraiths	Carnifex; Monuments; Black Tusk; Hang the Bastard; God Damn; Fathoms; Ohhms; The Colour Line
