= TRC (band) =

English hardcore punk and rap band

- Also known as: The Revolution Continues
- Origin: London, UK
- Genres: Hardcore punk, metalcore
- Years active: 2003-Present
- Labels: Rucktion Records, Siege of Amida Records, Thirty Days Of Night Records, No Sleep Records
- Members: Chris Robson; Anthony Carroll; Ben Taylor Dingwall; Sam Penny; Laselle Lewis; Charlie Wilson
- Past members: Richard Hiorns; Andrew Christos; Azim Nobeebaccus; Jamie West; Thomas Preston; Dave Regan; Oliver Reece; James Cook
- Website: https://trclondon.bandcamp.com/

TRC (abbreviated from The Revolution Continues) is an English metalcore and rap band from London. In total, they have released three albums and five EPs.

They have played UK festivals such as Sonisphere Download Festival. Hevy Fest and Ghostfest as well as Xtreme Fest in France, Bergenfest in Norway, as well as tours across Germany.

They have played alongside artists such as I Killed The Prom Queen, Hacktivist, Dog Eat Dog, Devil Sold His Soul, Your Demise, The Acacia Strain, The Ghost Inside, and Loathe.

They have been on rotation on mainstream radio stations such as BBC Radio 1 on multiple occasions through Zane Lowe's show, Daniel P Carter's Rock show and also on Mike Davies's Punk show. with an in-session performance at Maida Vale Studios.

TRC were nominated in 2012 as 'Best UK Band' in the Metal Hammer Golden Gods Awards.

== History ==
=== Formation, first EP, North West Kings and Destroy and Rebuild (2003 - 2007) ===
Formed in 2003, they self-released their first EP titled New London Hardcore 2003 alongside fellow hardcore band Prowler. This earned them a record deal with underground label Rucktion Records. Their next EP called North West Kings released in 2004.

Their first album Destroy and Rebuild came a few years later in 2007 and featured a more traditional hardcore sound compared to North West Kings.

=== The Revolution Continues and Bright Lights (2007 - 2011) ===
In 2009, the band was signed to Thirty Days of Night Records which has hardcore and metalcore bands on their roster including Gallows, Bring Me the Horizon, Your Demise and Architects. They released another EP called The Revolution Continues in 2009 and released music videos for Bastard and London's Greatest Love Story. The latter of which remains the TRC's most popular song on YouTube.

A single called Go Hard or Go Home was released in 2010 an accompanying music video. This would be TRC's last release under Thirty Days of Night Records.

In 2011, TRC were signed to Siege of Amida records and released their second album Bright Lights, with music videos released for H.A.T.E.R.S and Temptation.

=== Signing to No Sleep Records, We Bring War and Nation (2011 - 2016) ===
TRC signed to No Sleep Records on May 17, 2012 and released the single We Bring War along with a music video.

TRC re-released their 2009 EP The Revolution Continues as The Story So Far under this new label and added two new tracks - #TEAMUK and Heartless. These two tracks were released as singles, both receiving music videos.

During this time, TRC were nominated as "Best British Band" at the 2012 Metal Hammer Awards. This was the first award nomination for the band.

TRC's third album Nation released 20 September 2013. This album again featured a mixture of hardcore and hip-hop.

=== EP (Part 1) and Lifestyle EP (2016 - Present) ===
In 2016, TRC released The EP (Part 1) a three track EP. Music videos for Take It and Same. But Better.

Charlie Wilson and Laselle Lewis left TRC to form another band called Counting Days alongside Bring Me the Horizon's Curtis Ward. After finding replacements, TRC released a new EP called Lifestyle in 2018.

TRC reformed for a 20th anniversary show at The Dome, London on February 15th 2025. Charlie Wilson and Laselle Lewis rejoined for the occasion, marking the band's first show together in several years.

== Musical style and influences ==
TRC draw influences from hip-hop and grime as well as hardcore to create their own sound. They often mix harsh screamed vocals with rap.

== Awards ==
Metal Hammer Golden Gods Awards

Year	Nominee / work	Award	Result
2012	TRC	Best UK Band	Nominated

== Discography ==
TRC discography
- Studio albums: 3
- EPs: 6
- Singles: 5
- Music videos: 13

Studio Albums

Year	Name	Label
2007	"Destroy and Rebuild"	Rucktion Records: Format: CD, music download
2011	"Bright Lights"	Siege of Amida: Format: CD, music download
2013	"Nation"	No Sleep Records: Format: CD, music download, vinyl

Extended Plays

Year	Name	Label
2003	"TRC vs Prowler"	Self-release: Format: CD
2004	"North West Kings"	Rucktion Records: Format: CD, music download
2009	"The Revolution Continues"	Thirty Days Of Night Records: Format: CD, music download
2013	"The Story So Far"	No Sleep Records: Format: CD, music download
2016	"The EP (Part 1)"	Self-Release: Format: music download
2018	"Lifestyle"	Self-Release: Format: CD, music download, vinyl

Singles

Year	Name	Album
2010	"Go Hard or Go Home"	Bright Lights
2012	"Heartless"	The Story So Far
2012	"#TeamUK"	Nation
2013	"We Bring War"	Nation
2018	"Moaner"	Lifestyle

Music videos

Year	Name
2008	"Define Cocky"
2009	"London's Greatest Love Story"
2010	"Bastard"
2011	"Go Hard or Go Home"
2011	"H.A.T.E.R.S"
2012	"Temptation"
2012	"#TeamUK"
2013	"Heartless"
2013	"We Bring War"
2013	"10'000 Hours"
2018	"Moaner"
2018	"London's Greatest Love Story (Part 2)"
2018	"Lifestyle"
