= You and What Army =

English four-piece electronic rock band

- Origin: Telford, England, United Kingdom
- Genres: Electronicore; nu metal; electronic rock; rap rock
- Years active: 2007-2014 (hiatus)
- Label: Self-released
- Members: David Brown; Kieran Charles Smith; Jamie Hancox; Zak Hammond
- Past members: Joseph Allen; Darren Smith; Tom Bridgwater; Mark Yardley; Ben Roberts; Eamon Shortt; Jamie Patterson

You and What Army were an English four-piece electronic rock band formed in 2007, originating from Telford. It consisted of David Brown (vocals, synthesizers, sampling, turntables), Kieran Charles Smith (vocals, guitars), Jamie Hancox (bass, backing vocals) and Zak Hammond (drums, percussion) from 2008, and previously with Joseph Allen (guitar), Darren Smith (bass), and Thomas Bridgwater (drums). Although they are predominantly a rock band, they combine several different musical styles into their sound and are mainly influenced by heavy metal and electronic music.

== History ==
The band was formed in 2007 and performed extensively between September and December 2008, playing in bars, clubs and other small venues. They were voted second in Rocksound magazine's readers; poll for Best Live Unsigned Band. In January 2009, the band began recording their first EP, Soundtrack to the Apocalypse in Brown's home studio. The EP was produced, mixed and mastered by Brown and was released on 5 June 2009. With the EP, the band gigged throughout the summer and supported Hadouken in Wolverhampton during Hadouken's UK September/October tour.

Early in 2010, You and What Army was voted the third best unsigned act in Rock Sound magazine. You and What Army then started work on a second EP, The End of the Beginning, again recording in Brown's home studio in January and February. It was released on 26 March 2010.

In 2010, You And What Army played at Download Festival, T in the Park, Sonisphere, Underage Festival and Hevy Music Festival and toured with Kids in Glass Houses, and Boys Like Girls. You and What Army has also performed with Hadouken!, Chase and Status, Tempa T, My Passion, Goldie Lookin Chain, Dave McPherson, and Silent Descent.

You and What Army are also the winners of the Red Bull Bedroom Jam 2010.

In 2011, You and What Army played smaller headline shows. They returned to play Download Festival and Sonisphere Festival as well as Camden Crawl and Main Stage Osfest in Oswestry.

In 2012, the band released its EP You and What Army as both a digital release and physical copy. The MP3s were offered for free on NoiseTrade. You and What Army returned to perform at Download Festival in 2012 and released a music video, "Into Your Eyes", with clips from their live performance at Download festival.

The band stopped performing live and was working on their first album, which was scheduled to be released in 2013. However, on 10 July 2014, it was announced on their Facebook page that they were on indefinite hiatus, cancelling all plans of releasing what was to be their debut album.

Brown runs the YouTube channel 'Boyinaband' where he has made music tutorials, skits and videos involving the band, although he now largely creates vlogs and content centred around personal interests (including music). He has also collaborated with other YouTube creators. Brown has a career as a producer, specialising in rap, electronic and metal music.

Smith previously performed under the alias 12 Story Fall but now releases under his name 'Kieran Smith'. In October 2020, Smith discussed his experiences with child loss and released music dealing with this subject. He also spoke about his new role as guitarist in Alt-Pop band Bad Money.

== Musical style ==
You and What Army are influenced by a variety of music genres, including rock, rap, metal, djent, and various electronic music genres such as rave, drum and bass, gabber, trance, and electro house. The band's earliest songs didn't make use of clean vocals, however, following the addition of guitarist and vocalist Kieran Smith, the band started incorporating clean vocals on some songs. The band's second EP, The End Of The Beginning, features both rapping and screamed vocals from frontman Dave Brown, as well as clean vocals from Kieran Smith. The band's self-titled EP features influences from djent metal on tracks such as "Lucidity" and "Take the World by Storm", Dave Brown describing the latter one as "really heavy", as well as a "slow, less heavy" liquid drum and bass song ("Visionary") featuring both Brown and Smith singing.

== Red Bull Bedroom Jam ==
In 2010, the band entered themselves into the 'Red Bull Bedroom Jam' 2010, an online competition where the prize was to win the chance to play at five major festivals and to be the opening act for major band on a full UK tour. In the first stage, You and What Army performed a live gig from a bedroom live on the Internet. In the second stage, they played on the Red Bull stages at Download Festival, T in the Park, Sonisphere, Underage Festival and Hevy Festival. In the final part of the competition, the band was picked by judges Andy Copping, Beckie Sugden, Charlie Simpson (Fightstar) and Darren Taylor (Rocksound editor) to compete against the two other remaining bands within the competition in another public online voting system, which they won.

The band then spent two weeks in October in the Red Bull studio in London and recorded a four track EP, produced by John Mitchell at Outhouse Studios. It was released as a cover-mount by Rocksound magazine. The band also went on tour with Kids in Glass Houses and Boys Like Girls in support of the 'Dirt' tour in November. The EP was released as RockSound's CD cover mount on 2 February and had a CD-ROM which contained the band's progress throughout the RBBJ competition. This edition of Rock Sound had a full page feature on You and What Army.

== Band members ==
Current

- Dave Brown – vocals, synthesizers, sampling, turntables (2007–2014)
- Kieran Charles Smith – vocals, guitars (2008–2014)
- Jamie Hancox – bass guitar, backing vocals (2008–2014)
- Zak Hammond – drums, percussion (2008–2014)

Former

- Joseph Allen – guitars (2007–2008)
- Darren Smith – bass guitar (2007–2008)
- Tom Bridgwater – drums, percussion (2007–2008)
- Jamie Patterson - drums, percussion (2008)

Timeline

== Discography ==
Year	Album details
2009	Soundtrack to the Apocalypse; Released: 5 June; Format: CD, digital download
2010	The End of the Beginning; Released: 26 March; Format: CD, digital download
2011	You and What Army promo; Released: 2 February; Format: Rock Sound magazine covermount
2012	You and What Army EP; Released: 29 January (download), 2 April (CD); Format: CD, digital download
