= T in the Park 2010 =

Music festival in Scotland

T in the Park
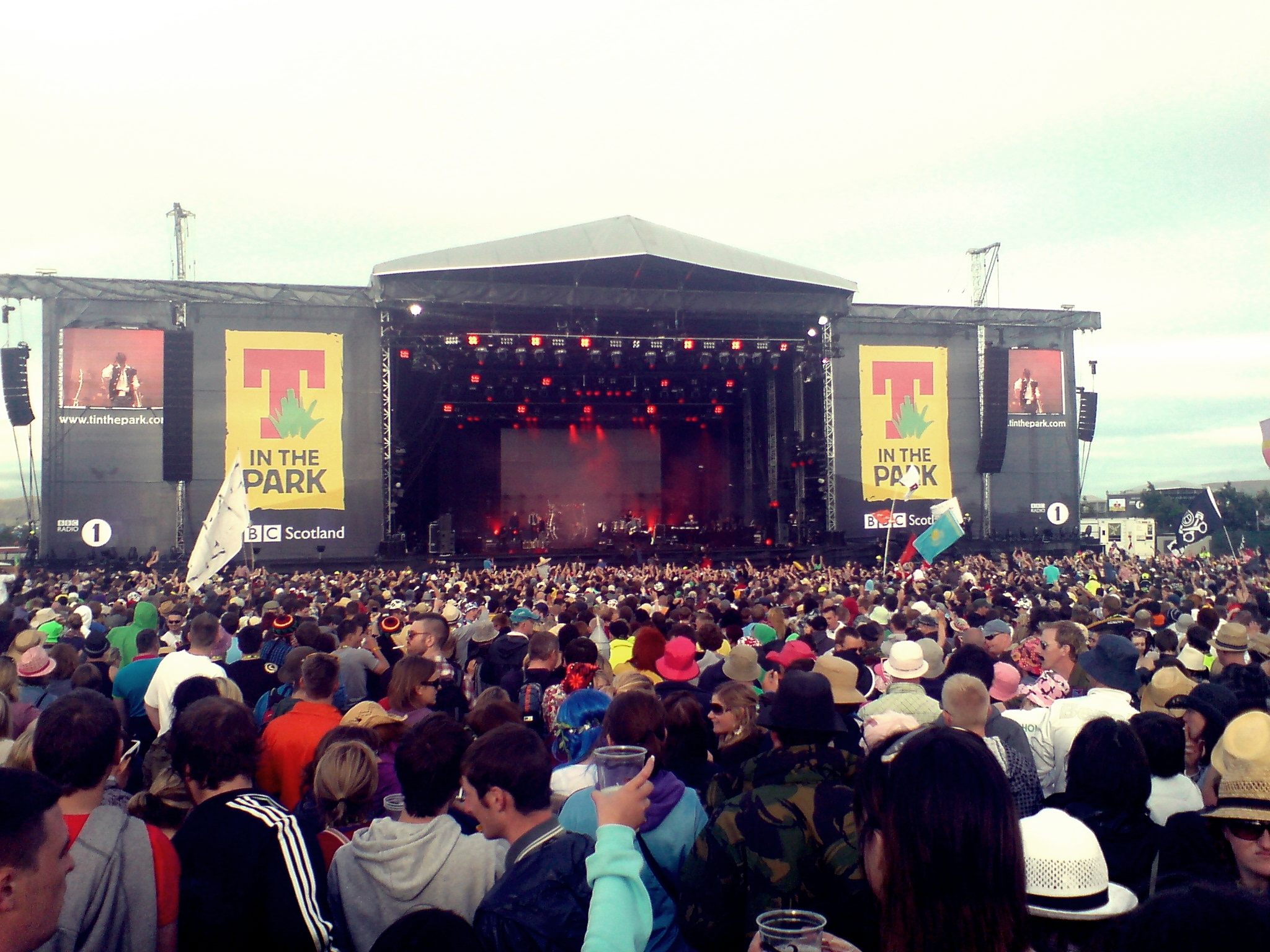
- Genre: Rock, Alternative rock, Indie rock, Hard rock, Punk rock, Grime, Trance, Rap, Techno, House, Electronic, Ceilidh, Jazz, Acoustic Music
- Dates: 8–11 July 2010
- Locations: Balado, Scotland, United Kingdom
- Years active: 1994 - present
- Website: tinthepark.com

T in the Park 2010 was a British music festival that took place in Balado, Scotland, from 8–11 July 2010. It was the seventeenth event to take place. The festival was headlined by Kasabian, Muse and Eminem. Tickets for the event sold out on 26 February 2010.

The 2010 festival was marred by the death of a reveller, as well as various anti-social and violent behaviour including two attempted murders and a sexual assault. In an article on that year's event, an MTV reporter wrote: "Frankly I wouldn't go through there [T in the Park] unless I had a tank."

== Tickets ==
Similar to previous years, early-bird tickets were released within two days of the conclusion of the 2009 event, on 14 July 2009. Tickets remained on sale until the following Sunday. The line-up was billed to include 180 artists across eleven stages. A further 'Christmas sale' took place from 4 December 2009, with tickets made available at 2009 festival ticket prices.

Full-price tickets went on sale on 26 February 2010, selling out the same morning for the first time. The festival's campsite area was set to expand by 5,000, despite no increase in overall capacity. The campsite area was also scheduled to open from the Thursday prior to the event, to reduce traffic congestion travelling towards the festival. A final batch of tickets were made available for sale on 4 June, selling out in under five hours.

== Line-up ==
In an interview with the Perthshire Advertiser on 8 September 2009, Matt Bellamy of Muse spoke of playing the festival in 2010, saying "I'm sure we’ll be trying to get something, maybe T in the Park or maybe something else". During the same month in an interview with the Daily Record, Kasabian would also say they wanted to headline the festival. The band expressed further interest in playing during a performance at Glasgow's SECC on 12 November 2009. Kasabian were confirmed as the first headliner of the festival on 3 December 2009.

At a launch party on 23 February 2010, further line-up details of the festival emerged. Muse and Eminem were confirmed as the first and second night headliners, respectively, with Kasabian to headline the final night. The festival marks Eminem's first festival performance since 2001, and debut appearance at the T in the Park. On 9 March 2010, more bands were announced, with The Black Eyed Peas, The Prodigy and Madness confirmed as the Friday, Saturday and Sunday headliners of the Radio 1/NME stage. A further ten artists were announced on 23 March. On 14 April, the festival announced the initial line-up for its Red Bull Bedroom Jam Futures Stage, including special "guests of honour" headliners Echo and the Bunnymen, Julian Casablancas and Ash. Additional bands have been announced through the festival's Twitter page.

Friday 9 July	Saturday 10 July	Sunday 11 July
Main Stage
Muse; Faithless; Editors; Paloma Faith; The Big Pink	Eminem; Stereophonics; Paolo Nutini; Vampire Weekend; The Proclaimers; Newton Faulkner; Scouting for Girls; Chipmunk	Kasabian; Jay-Z; Biffy Clyro; Dizzee Rascal; The View; Skunk Anansie; The Stranglers
Radio 1 / NME Stage
The Black Eyed Peas; Florence and the Machine; Jamie T; The Temper Trap; Kids in Glass Houses	The Prodigy; Thirty Seconds to Mars; The Courteeners; The Black Keys; Shed Seven; Joshua Radin; The Sunshine Underground; Local Natives	Madness; Groove Armada; The Cribs; Babyshambles; Rise Against; Airbourne; Billy Talent; Frank Turner; Delta Maid
King Tut's Wah Wah Tent
Calvin Harris; Hot Chip; La Roux; Dirty Projectors; 3OH!3; Everything Everything	Mumford & Sons; Rodrigo y Gabriela; The Coral; We Are Scientists; Frightened Rabbit; Kate Nash; Broken Social Scene; Diana Vickers; General Fiasco	David Guetta; Goldfrapp; Empire of the Sun; Gossip; Ellie Goulding; Corinne Bailey Rae; Kassidy; Darwin Deez; Daisy Dares You
Red Bull Bedroom Jam Futures Stage
Echo & the Bunnymen; Kele; Delphic; Mayer Hawthorne & the County; Chapel Club; Sacred Betrayal	Julian Casablancas; Laura Marling; Mystery Jets; Example; The Middle East; Lissie; The Knux	Ash; Bombay Bicycle Club; The Drums; Yeasayer; Two Door Cinema Club; Black Mountain; Hurts; Detroit Social Club
Slam Tent
	Carl Cox; Fake Blood; Erol Alkan; Four Tet; Adam Bayer; D12; Paul Ritch; DJ Yoda; Greg Wilson; Hilltop Hoods	Plastikman; Sven Väth; Dubfire; Slam; Crookers; Tricky; Andrew Weatherall & Ivan Smagghe; Pan Pot; Harvey Mckay; Gary Beck
BBC Introducing Stage
	Young Fathers; Airship; Real Dolls; Hip Parade; Maxsta; Lily McKenzie; Admiral Fallow; Cattle and Cane; Gold Sounds; JKLMNO; Lou Hickey	Aerials Up; Arp Attack; Blitz Kids; Silver Columns; Smiler; Profisee; Liam Bailey; The Arcadian Kicks; Jake Flowers; Fixers; North Atlantic Oscillation
Bacardi B-Live Stage
Lel Palfrey; Greg Wilson; A Skillz vs Krafty Kuts; Kissy Sell Out	Mikey Inglis; Craig Smith; Horse Meat Disco; Greco Roman Sound System; MJ Cole	Phil Lamb; Gareth Sommerville; The Revenge; Maurice Fulton; Jaymo & Andy George

Other performances which took place across the weekend on the T Break stage were Unicorn Kid, Pearl and the Puppets, Alex Gardner, Twisted Wheel, Matthew P, White Belt Yellow Tag, Sparrow & the Workshop, The Boy Who Trapped the Sun, Kid Adrift, Astral Planes, Eliza Doolittle, A Band Called Quinn, Midnight Lion, Be Like Pablo, French Wives, Fridge Magnets, Kitty the Lion, Kobi Onyame, Lightguides, Make Sparks, Mitchell Museum, Mopp, Night Noise Team, Stanley Odd, The Draymin, The Ray Summers, The Seventeenth Century, Three Blind Wolves, Washington Irving and Hearts Under Fire. Wolfmother were originally billed to appear on the Radio 1/NME stage on Saturday, but pulled out for health reasons. Similarly, due to unforeseen circumstances, John Mayer pulled out of a scheduled slot on the Main Stage on Sunday. Drake was also billed to appear on the Red Bull Bedroom Jam Futures Stage, but pulled out due to his mother's ill health.

== Film production ==
The feature film You Instead was filmed live at T in the Park 2010. The film tells the story of the lead singers of two bands – Luke Treadaway and Natalia Tena – who get handcuffed together before their performances. The film features brief appearances from various performers and bands at the 2010 festival: Paolo Nutini, Biffy Clyro, The Proclaimers, Calvin Harris, Paloma Faith, Newton Faulkner (has a scripted scene), Al Green, Jo Mango (has a scripted scene), Heather Suttie, Kassidy and The View.

You Instead was filmed in 5 days at the 2010 Festival. As the movie was filmed on site the cast and crew were constantly reacting to their surroundings and incorporating them into the performances. The cast and crew camped backstage at the festival. The film was edited daily after shooting was finished for the day as scenes could not be re-shot after the festival was finished. Director David Mackenzie said one of the factors of him casting the two lead parts was that Treadaway and Tena both have musical experience. Two of the songs performed in the film were written by Treadaway and Tena.

== Transport ==
DF Concerts (T in the Park promoter) Sign a £3 million new contract with Scottish Citylink to continue its role as the official transport provider (since 2000) until 2015.

Aiden Proctor, commercial manager for Scottish Citylink, said T in the Park brings people from the United Kingdom and beyond to Kinross, making transport services necessary to manage travel volume. Proctor stated that since partnering with DF Concerts in 2002, Scottish Citylink has transported people to the festival, reduced road traffic, and lowered carbon emissions. The partnership between Scottish Citylink and DF Concerts was extended for five years.

Scottish Citylink transported almost 30,000 passengers to T in the Park 2010.
