= RockNess 2008 =

Music festival in Scotland

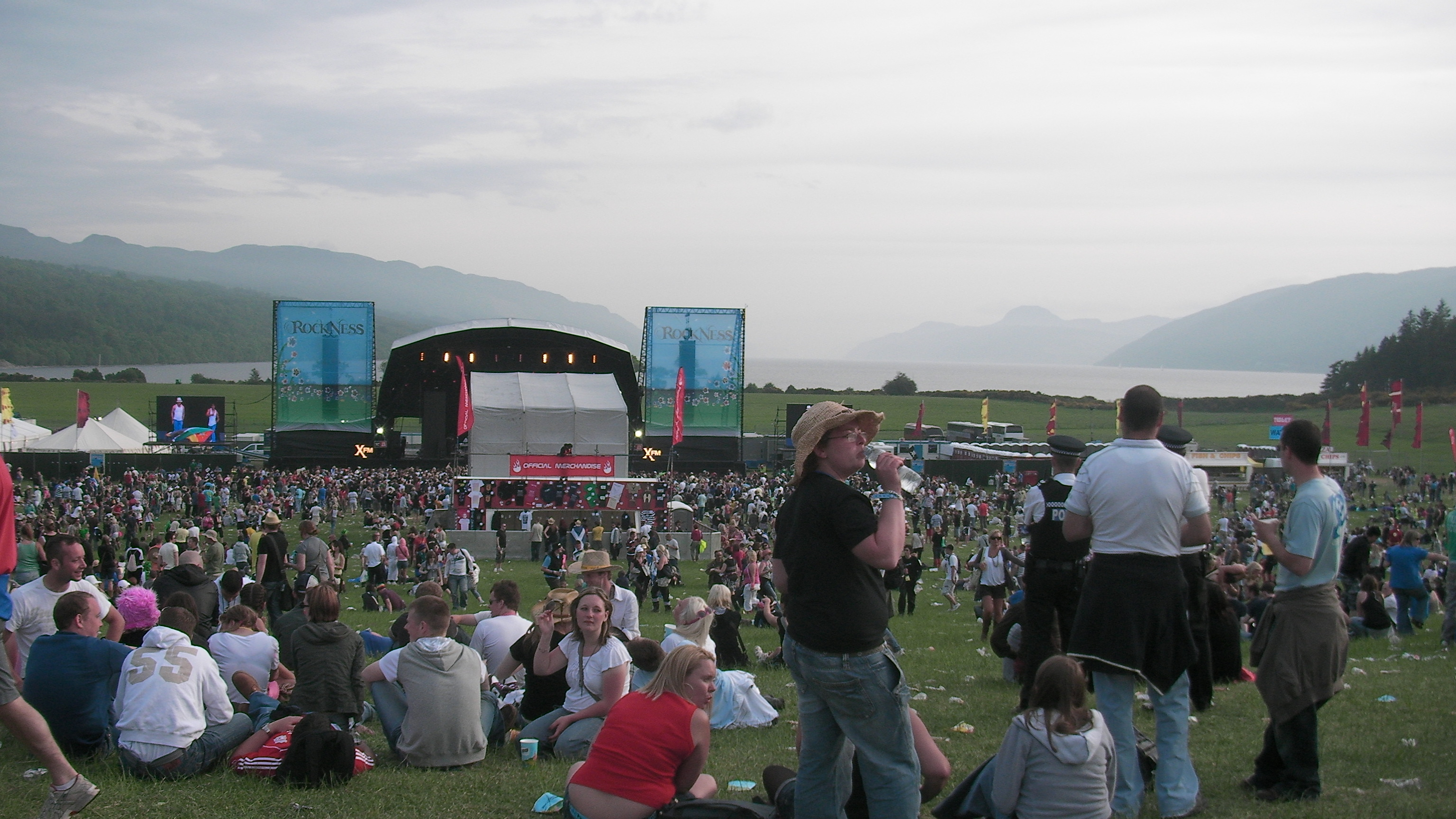
- View of the main stage overlooking Loch Ness at the 2008 event.
- Genre: Festival
- Locations: Clunes Farm, Dores, Scotland, United Kingdom
- Country: Scotland
- Previous event: RockNess 2007
- Next event: RockNess 2009
- Attendance: ~30,000

RockNess 2008 was the third RockNess Festival to take place. It took place on 7 June and 8 June. Fatboy Slim returned to Loch Ness to headline the Saturday on the mainstage. The other main headliners were Razorlight, The View, Underworld, 2manydjs and Annie Mac.

Due to the death the previous year, tighter restrictions were put in place for car park access at the 2008 event. Festival goers were told that they would not be permitted to return to their cars during the weekend. Due to public pressure this was later relaxed to permit multiple trips for unloading camping equipment, but alcohol would only be permitted on the first entry. This amendment was not well published however leading to much confusion over the position on returning to cars. In addition the VIP car park was not well signposted leading many VIP ticket holders to park in the main car park.

In the 2008 festival a teenager was found unconscious in front of the main stage. He was taken to hospital by air ambulance but later died.

A couple from Paisley, Ronald Davidson and Victoria Greig were married at the 2008 event after becoming engaged at the festival the previous year. The event took place in the Big Love inflatable church on the Saturday afternoon.
