= Underage Festival =

Music festival in London

Coordinates: 51.537°N 0.038°W

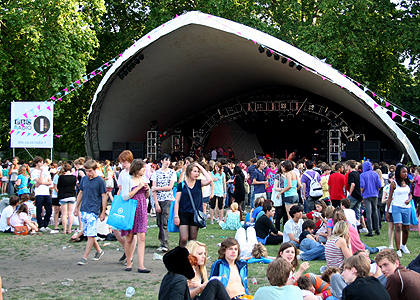
- The Domino 15th Anniversary Stage at Underage Festival 2008
- Genre: Various, primarily Rock, Pop, Indie
- Dates: Early August (2nd/8th/10th)
- Locations: Victoria Park, London
- Years active: 2007-2011
- Founders: Sam Kilcoyne
- Website: Official Website

The Underage Festival was a music festival in Victoria Park, London that was open only to those between 13 and 17.

The festival took place at the beginning of August each year. There were five main stages: the Converse Century Main Stage, the NME Stage, the Topman New Music Stage, the Domino Stage (aptly named the "Domino 15th Anniversary Stage" for the label's 15th anniversary of creation in 2008), and the Red Bull Bedroom Jam Stage. As well, some of the smaller features included the Habbo DJ tent, the CM Tower Hamlets Music Space Stage, and the Artrocker Signing Tent. The 2008 event also included a Myspace bus, where secret sets and interviews with bands took place.

The festival evolved out of a series of club nights, held in the Elephant and Castle area of South London and hosted and organised by Sam Kilcoyne, the teenage son of Barry 7 from Add N to (X) and current member of the band S.C.U.M, after he was refused admission to a Buzzcocks gig for being only 14. These became popular with preteens and teenagers and even received press coverage in broadsheet national newspapers like The Guardian and the BBC's arts programmes, which reported it as a "youthquake".

Following the cancellation of the 2012 event, no further editions have taken place.

== Festivals held ==
=== 2007 ===
The 2007 festival took place on 10 August 2007.

=== 2008 ===
The 2008 festival took place on 8 August 2008. The event was a success, with around 10,000 fans attending. Many queued for hours prior to the gates opening to gain entry. Headliners included Gallows, Dizzee Rascal, Foals, and The Dykeenies.

The Horrors were originally scheduled to play the Main Stage, but had to pull out due to recording commitments. They were replaced by Dizzee Rascal. Mystery Jets were also scheduled to open the festival with a set on the Main Stage, but pulled out just a few days before due to their lead singer Blaine Harrison being in hospital. They were replaced with Kid Harpoon.

XX Teens set featured an appearance by famous anti-war protester Brian Haw, who was at the time the longest residing resident of the peace camp situated outside Parliament Square. Following set-closer "For Brian Haw", Haw gave a ten-minute speech regarding the War in Iraq.

The Myspace bus featured an acoustic set by Bombay Bicycle Club, as well as an interview with Dizzee Rascal for website need2know.

=== 2009 ===
Soon after the 2008 festival, Eat Your Own Ears announced in an email to fans that the 2009 festival would again take place in Victoria Park in east London, on 2 August 2009. Tickets for the event were available from early February. During his BBC Introducing... show for Radio 1, Huw Stephens announced some of the acts playing the festival, including headliners, The Pigeon Detectives.

=== 2010 ===
The tickets for this year's festival first went on sale in early January, where it took place in Victoria Park, London, on 1 August 2010. The line-up consisted of newly famous acts such as Ellie Goulding, Tinie Tempah and Chiddy Bang, as well as some acts such as Hadouken! and Tinchy Stryder returning for their second Underage Festival.

=== 2011 ===
The event was held on 5 August 2011 at Victoria Park, London and tickets for the event went on sale in January 2011. The first line-up of the year's acts was announced on 8 March by Huw Stephens live on BBC Radio 1. Huw Stephens announced that Yasmin, Frankie & The Heartstrings, The Midnight Beast, Yaaks, Spark, Roll Deep, Giggs, Janelle Monáe, Devlin, Fugative The Chapman Family, Maverick Sabre, Brother, Cocknbullkid, Florrie, Crystal Fighters, with Bombay Bicycle Club headlining. The Red Bull Bedroom Jam Stage was to be headlined by My Passion, whilst other acts on the stage included Page 44, Blitz Kids And Autumn In Disguise, as well as many more. The New Roundhouse Rising stage was opened by Younghearts, an up-and-coming London based indie band with a forthcoming single "Isolation", which was due to be released soon.

=== 2012 ===
The event was scheduled to be held on 31 August. On 27 July it was announced that, due to production issues and the new location, the festival had been cancelled for 2012. Organisers stated they were hopeful of returning to the old site in 2013.
