= RockNess 2006 =

Music festival in Scotland

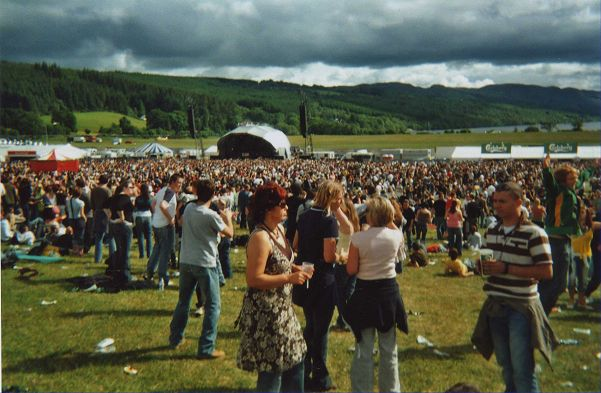
- A View of RockNess at the 2006 event
- Genre: Festival
- Locations: Clunes Farm, Dores, Scotland, United Kingdom
- Country: Scotland
- Next event: RockNess 2007
- Attendance: ~20,000

RockNess 2006 was the first RockNess festival to take place. Fatboy Slim took his 'Brighton Beach Party' to the shores of Loch Ness to create the first festival which was held on Saturday 24 June 2006. All of the 20,000 tickets were sold at price of £32.50.

The festival had two stages, a main stage and big top, which were active throughout the day. It started at midday and both stages hosted different dance acts about every hour and a half. Acts included X-Press 2, Stanton Warriors, Scratch Perverts, Linus Loves, Cagedbaby, Audio Bullys, Slam, Mylo, Carl Cox with Fatboy Slim headlining.

2006 Festival Map
