= All Our Favourite Stories =

Studio album by Dog Is Dead
- Released: 8 October 2012
- Genre: Indie rock, indie pop
- Label: Atlantic Records
- Producer: Guy Elderfield; David Kosten; Rob Milton

All Our Favourite Stories is the debut album by British band Dog Is Dead, released by Atlantic Records in October 2012. Music from the track "Heal It" was used for Sky Sports' coverage of the UEFA Champions League, while "Glockenspiel Song" had been featured in an episode of Skins. Music from the album has also featured in the reality TV shows Made in Chelsea and The Only Way is Essex.

== Recording ==
After signing to Atlantic Records, the band entered RAK Studios to begin work on their debut album with producer David Kosten. Unhappy with the way that these sessions were heading, the band relocated back to Random Recordings – the Nottingham studio they had previously used to record their early demo tapes. Recording for the album was completed there, with production coming from studio owner/ producer Guy Elderfield and Dog Is Dead's singer Rob Milton.

== Artwork ==
The cover of the album features a collage of 1970s schoolchildren walking along a suburban pathway, unwittingly approaching a black hole. The image was inspired by the work of the artist Valero Doval.

== Reception ==
=== Commercial performance ===
All Our Favourite Stories entered the UK Albums Chart during the week ending 20 October and peaked at number 45.

=== Critical response ===
Professional ratings
Aggregate scores
Source	Rating
Metacritic	55/100
Review scores
Source	Rating
AllMusic	3.5/5 stars
BBC Music	(neutral)
Drowned in Sound	(8/10)
The Guardian	4/5 stars
Metro	3/5 stars
musicOMH	4/5 stars
NME	(6/10)
The Observer	4/5 stars

Upon its release, All Our Favourite Stories received a mixed critical response. At Metacritic, which assigns a weighted average score out of 100 to reviews and ratings from mainstream critics, the album has received a score of 55, based on 9 reviews, indicating "mixed or average reviews".

The album was described by the Observer as containing "punchy pop songs with immediate, uncomplicated appeal", while its sister publication the Guardian praised the "solid gold indie pop songs ornamented with real precision and flair". The NME was less complimentary, lamenting the loss of the band's early, rougher sound which it considered had been replaced by "earnest but uninspiring anthemic rock". Lack of originality was also a concern for BBC Music, which noted that the album did not "bring anything new to the table". Drowned in Sound were more generous, stating that Dog Is Dead had released "one of 2012's finest debuts". All Our Favourite Stories also found favour with musicOMH, who argued that it was "one of the most entertaining albums of the year".

== Track listing ==
No.	Title	Length
1.	"Get Low"	4:04
2.	"Do the Right Thing"	4:26
3.	"Teenage Daughter"	4:12
4.	"Talk Through the Night"	3:38
5.	"Two Devils"	4:21
6.	"Hands Down"	4:22
7.	"Glockenspiel Song"	3:28
8.	"Heal It"	3:59
9.	"River Jordan"	4:42
10.	"Any Movement"	4:10

Deluxe version bonus tracks
No.	Title	Length
11.	"Young"	3:49
12.	"The Well"	5:06
13.	"Ricochet"	4:25
14.	"Burial Ground"	6:15
15.	"Talent Show"	4:23
16.	"All Our Favourite Outtakes"	5:15
