= RockNess =

Music festival

Coordinates: 57.386°N 4.334°W

Rockness Festival
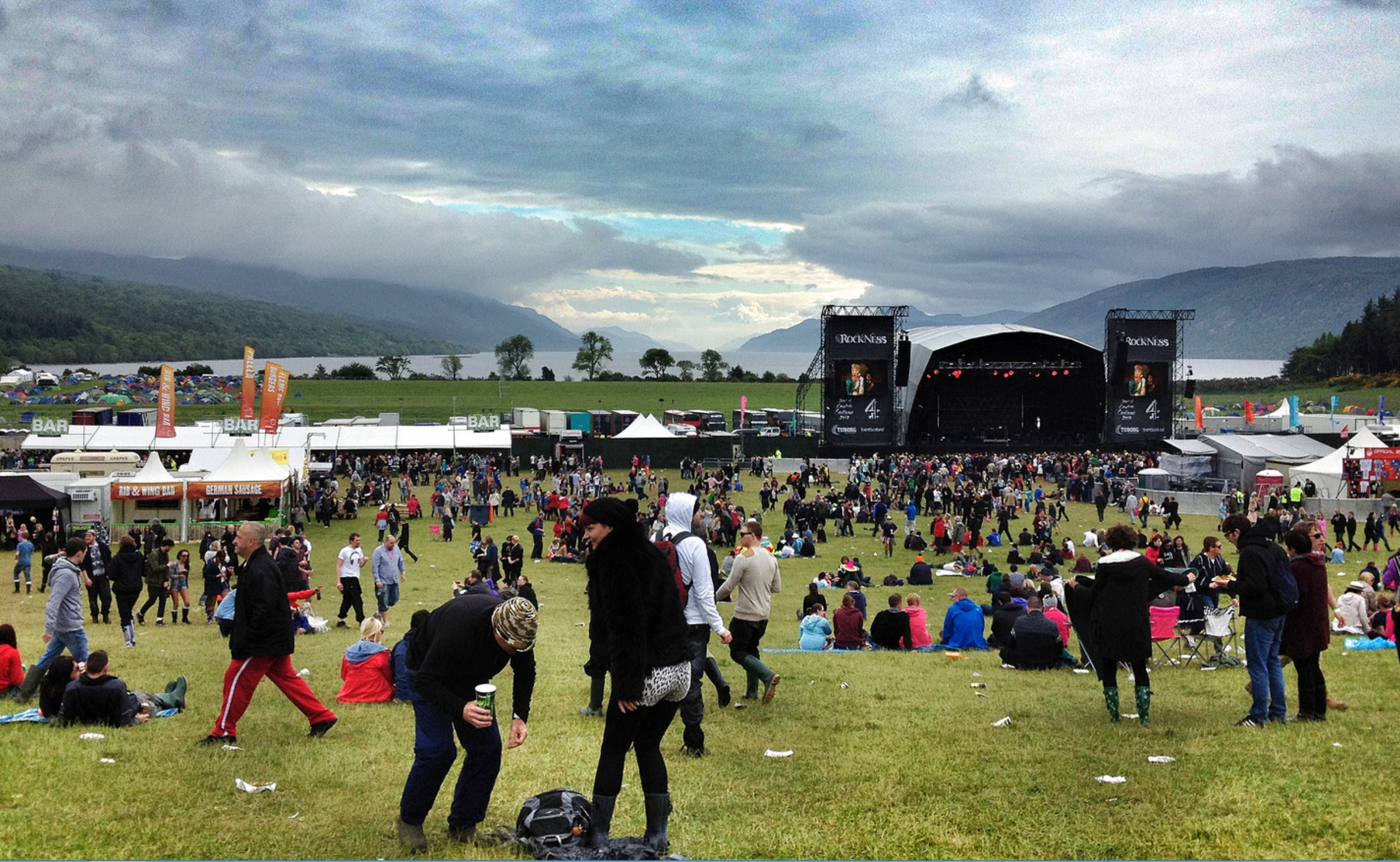
- Genre: Alternative rock, dance, electronic, hip-hop, indie rock
- Dates: Second weekend in June
- Locations: Dores, Highland, Scotland
- Years active: 2006–2013

RockNess was an annual music festival which took place in Scotland at Clune Farm, Dores, on the banks of Loch Ness in the Scottish Highlands. The festival was known as "the most beautiful festival in the world" and "the only festival with its own monster" due to its scenic location at Loch Ness which is the alleged home of the cryptozoological Loch Ness Monster. Despite the festival's name, it was not a rock festival exclusively, often showcasing dance, electronic, and hip-hop music.

The inaugural Rockness festival took place on 24 June 2006. In June 2008, AEG took over as the main promoter of the festival. The festival grew in size each year until its final edition in 2013.

== Beginnings ==
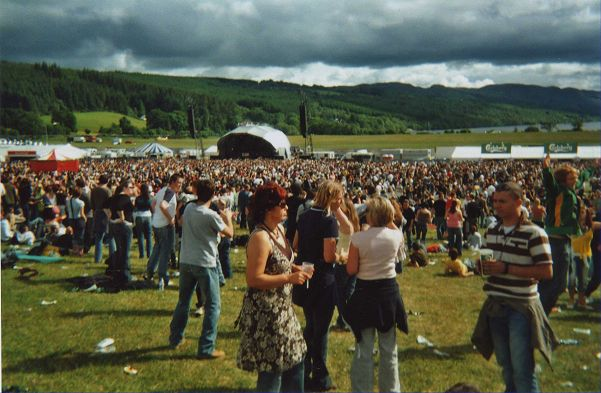
A View of the main stage at the 2006 event

Fatboy Slim took his 'Brighton Beach Party' to the shores of Loch Ness to create the first festival which was held on Saturday 24 June 2006. All of the 20,000 tickets were sold at price of £32.50. The festival had two stages, a main stage and big top, which were active throughout the day. It started at midday and both stages hosted different dance acts about every hour and a half. Acts included X-Press 2, Stanton Warriors, Scratch Perverts, Linus Loves, Cagedbaby, Audio Bullys, Slam, Mylo, Carl Cox with Fatboy Slim headlining. The following year in 2007 the festival was greatly increased in size to accommodate over 35,000 festival goers over two days. It was in 2009 that the festival became a three-day festival.

== Lineups ==
Edition	Year	Dates	Tickets sold	Headliners	Full lineup
1	2006	24 June	10,000	Fatboy Slim	RockNess 2006
2	2007	9–10 June	35,000	The Chemical Brothers, Groove Armada, Manic Street Preachers, Daft Punk	RockNess 2007
3	2008	7–8 June	40,000	Fatboy Slim, Razorlight, The View, Underworld	RockNess 2008
4	2009	12–14 June	35,000	Flaming Lips, Basement Jaxx, The Prodigy	RockNess 2009
5	2010	11–13 June	35,000	Fatboy Slim, Leftfield, The Strokes	RockNess 2010
6	2011	10–12 June	35,000	Kasabian, The Chemical Brothers, Paolo Nutini	RockNess 2011
7	2012	8–10 June	35,000	Mumford & Sons, Deadmau5, Biffy Clyro	RockNess 2012
8	2013	7–9 June	30,000	Basement Jaxx, Example, Plan B	RockNess 2013

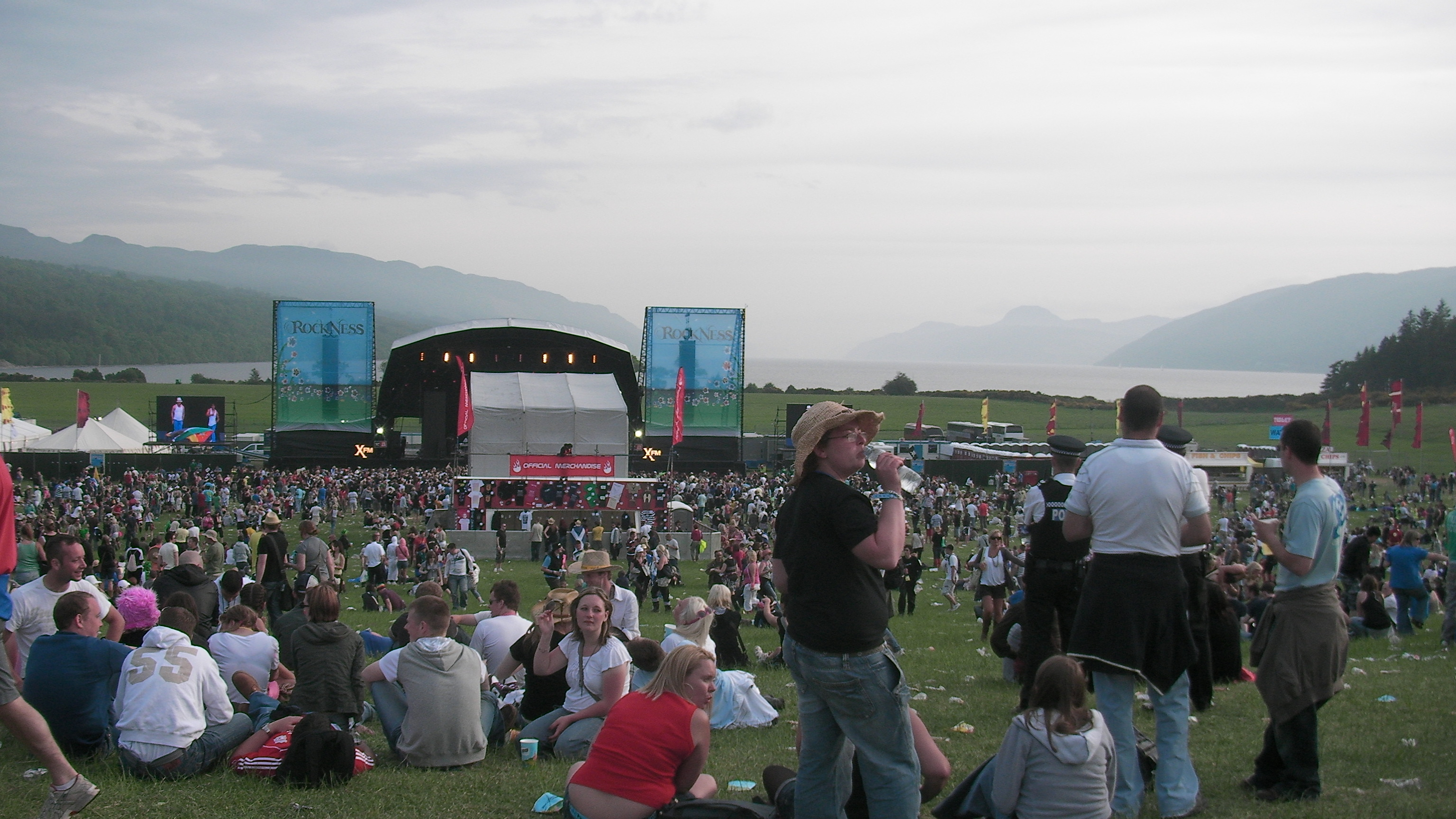
View of the main stage overlooking Loch Ness at the 2008 event.

It was named best small festival at the NME Awards in 2011 and 2012.

== Cancellations ==
On 19 March 2014 organizers of the festival announced that "due to the addition of a number of events alongside the World Cup and the Commonwealth Games" there would be no Rockness held in 2014.

Despite hopes of a return in 2015, organisers confirmed in January that the festival would again be cancelled.

A new festival, Groove Loch Ness, was held in the same venue on 22 August 2015. This was described as a "back-to-basics dance festival", with a single stage, headlined by Groove Armada. About 4,500 people attended the one-day event.

== Media sponsors ==
UK new music station, XFM was the official radio broadcast partner for the festival coverage until 2009 when the BBC took over radio rights and also provided internet services.

Channel 4 broadcast highlights of the 2008 festival weekend on national television, bringing highlights of each band's set live. They also provided television coverage for 2009.

In January 2010, Rockness confirmed BBC Radio 1 as the official media sponsors, providing live coverage over the weekend as well as full TV Coverage.

In addition to the official media sponsors as of April 2010 employment website Monster.co.uk was a sponsor for RockNess 2010.
