= Be Like Pablo =

Scottish indie pop band

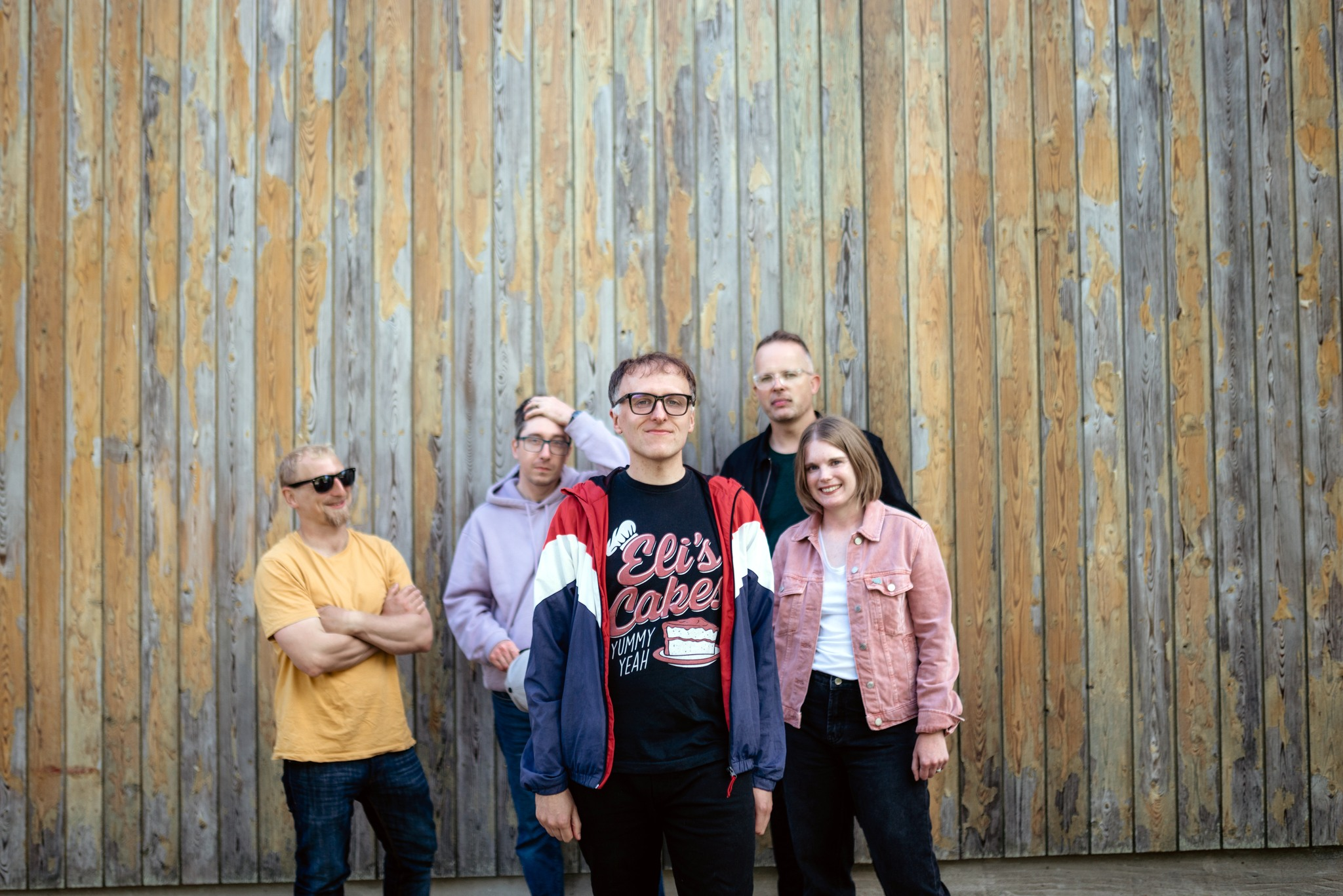
- Be Like Pablo (2024)

Background information
- Origin: Forres, Scotland
- Genres: Power pop, indie, rock
- Years active: 2010–present
- Members: Ewen Watson, Ross Watson, Andrew Stepien, Karen McLauchlan, Richard Marshall
- Past members: Jamie Murphy
- Website: www.belikepablo.com

Be Like Pablo are a Scottish indie power pop band from Forres, Scotland. Formed in 2010, the band have released two studio albums and several singles, and have performed at UK music festivals and on national radio. Their sound has been described as melodic power-pop with strong harmonies and retro pop influences.

== History ==
Be Like Pablo were formed in 2010 by brothers Ewen and Ross Watson together with Jamie Murphy. The group's debut album, The New Adventures, was released in 2013 through Stray Cat Records in the UK and ThisTime Records in Japan, and received a review in the independent music publication, musicOMH.

Between 2017 and 2019 the band released a series of singles, recorded with producer Rocky O’Reilly. Their second album, A World Apart, was released in 2024 and received an in-depth review by Poprock Record, where it was named one of the year's must-have LPs.

The band has performed live on national radio, including sessions for BBC Radio 1 Scotland's Vic Galloway Show in 2010 and BBC Radio Scotland in 2012. They have also performed at music events including T in the Park 2010, RockNess (2012) and the Belladrum Tartan Heart Festival.

== Musical style ==
The band’s music has been described as "witty, infectious geek rock" and compared to Weezer and The Cars by reviewers in Scottish music and culture publications.

== Reception ==
Be Like Pablo have received significant, independent, secondary coverage, including dedicated full album reviews from musicOMH and Poprock Record, as well as features and coverage from outlets such as The Scotsman, Clash, and Is This Music?. A dedicated feature article on the band's influences appeared in Words and Guitars. Their music has been described as "Quirky Scottish indie-rock in the style of a particularly giddy Weezer" by the New Musical Express (NME) magazine. Additionally, BBC presenters such as Dermot O’Leary, Steve Lamacq and Vic Galloway have featured their music on air.

== Members ==
=== Current ===
- Ewen Watson
- Ross Watson
- Andrew Stepien
- Karen McLauchlan
- Richard Marshall

=== Former ===
- Jamie Murphy

== Discography ==
=== Studio albums ===
- The New Adventures (2013).
- A World Apart (2024).

=== Selected singles ===
- "Julianne / The Post-It Song" (2010)
- "Spirit of Adventure" (2011)
- "Someone to Love" (2012)
- "Without the Pain" feat. Kuda (2013).
- "There She Is" (2017).
- "My Kind of Girl" (2018).
