= Yaaku =

Yaaku may refer to:

- the Yaaku people
- the Yaaku language
