= Dores, Highland =

Coordinates: 57.380806°N 4.333099°W

Dores: Scottish Gaelic: Duras
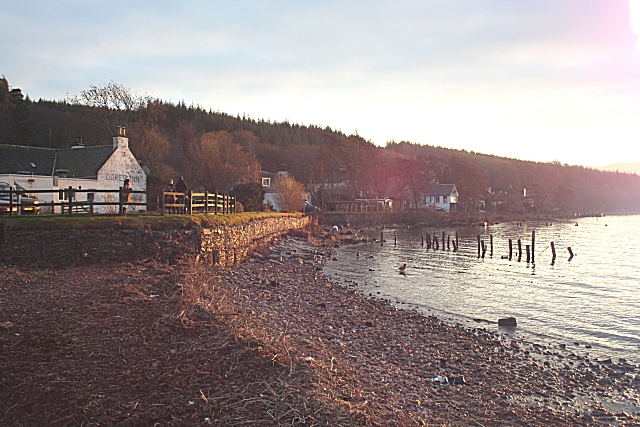
- Almost horizontal light from the setting sun gives a slightly unreal look to the village of Dores. Dores Inn is visible on the left.

- Location within the Inverness area
- Population: 109 (2001 Census)
- OS grid reference: NH59673500
- Council area: Highland
- Lieutenancy area: Inverness
- Country: Scotland
- Sovereign state: United Kingdom
- Post town: INVERNESS
- Postcode district: IV2
- Dialling code: 01463
- Police: Scotland
- Fire: Scottish
- Ambulance: Scottish
- UK Parliament: Inverness, Skye and West Ross-shire
- Scottish Parliament: Highlands and Islands; Inverness East, Nairn and Lochaber

Dores (Scottish Gaelic: Duras) is a village located on the east shore of Loch Ness, 10 km south west of the city of Inverness, in the Highland council area of Scotland. The now defunct RockNess music festival used to take place in fields to the north of the village.
