= Dog Is Dead =

English indie pop band

D.I.D
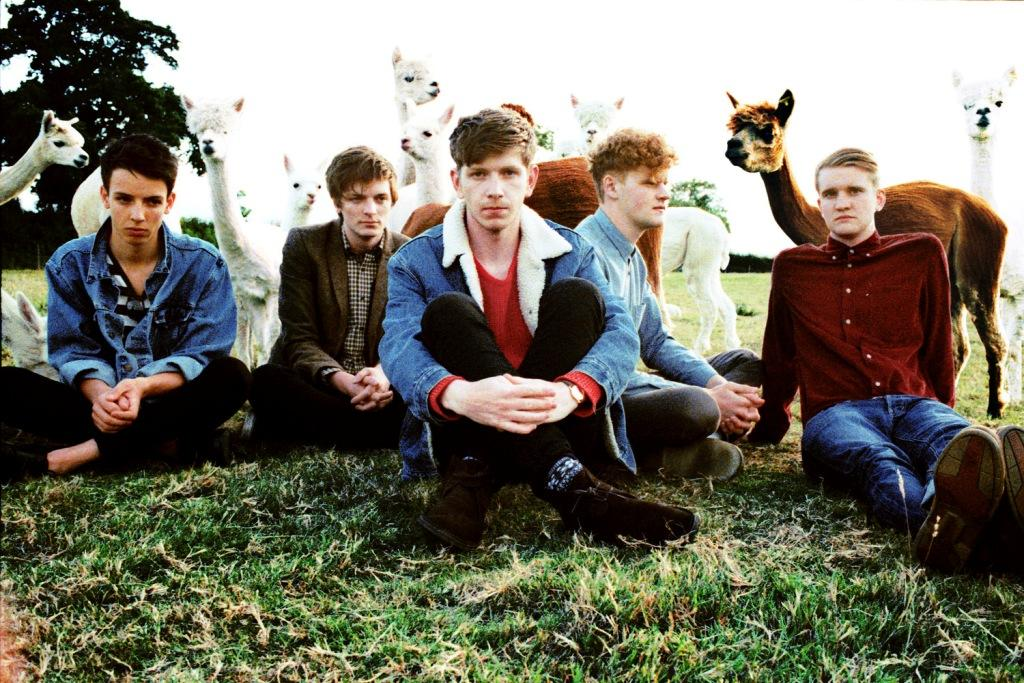
- D.I.D

Background information
- Origin: West Bridgford, Nottingham, England
- Genre: Indie pop
- Years active: 2008–2016
- Labels: Your Childhood Records; Atlantic Records
- Members: Robert Howie Milton; Joss Van Wilder; Daniel Harvey; Lawrence 'Trev' Cole; Rob 'Paul Roberts' White
- Past members: Lawrence Libor
- Website: didnotts.com

D.I.D, formerly known as Dog Is Dead, are a five-piece indie pop band from West Bridgford, Nottingham, who have described their music as "an original blend of harmonious, indie-pop in the disco, with a cheeky jazz hint" and "uplifting pop for jazz junkies and choir folk". The band consists of Robert Howie Milton (main vocals, guitar, bass guitar), Rob 'Paul Roberts' White (vocals, guitar), Joss Van Wilder (vocals, keyboards, guitar, accordion), Lawrence 'Trev' Cole (vocals, saxophone, bass guitar) and Daniel Harvey (drums).

The band are also well known for their sense of humor. This was showcased when a screenshot taken by keys player Joss was featured on popular Twitter page LADbible after a prank in which his phone number was placed on Gumtree alongside an advert for kittens and he was inundated with responses.

== History ==
=== Early years ===
Robert Milton, Joss Van Wilder and Lawrence 'Trev' Cole met at the West Bridgford School. Rob and Joss first played together aged 13 in a band they named "Oh Henry!", after the Oh Henry! chocolate bar. They first played as "Dog is Dead", together with Trev, at the school concert "Bridgstock", taking their name from a favourite joke at the time. They have also given an alternative explanation that the name came from Shakespeare's Richard III. Trev brought in one of his old friends from Primary School, Lawrence Libor, to become the band's original full-time drummer. Trev also brought in guitarist Rob White, whom he attended a drama club with. Rob White goes by the name 'Paul Roberts' to avoid having two people called Rob in the band. The band initially played gigs at friends' parties and at schools. The band started securing gigs in Nottingham in late 2007. In 2008 they started performing live at many venues in Nottingham, including the Bodega Social Club, Junction 7 and at the city's 'Splendour' festival.

=== 2009–2010: Your Childhood Records ===
In 2009 the band supported acts including One Night Only and Cajun Dance Party. In April, they released their debut promotional EP under their own label "Your Childhood Records". and performed at Splendour in Nottingham and Dot to Dot Festival.

=== 2010–2011: Glastonbury ===
In 2010 they supported more acts, including OK Go. They returned to the Dot to Dot Festival, and appeared at Glastonbury on the BBC Introducing stage and OX4.

In June they released their first single "Glockenspiel Song" under their own label (later rerecorded and released under Atlantic Records in 2012). This version was recorded at Nottingham's Random Recording Studios. and followed later in the year by "Young". Both singles received airplay on BBC national Radio 1 and Radio 6 Music.

=== 2011–2012: TV, Atlantic Records and Europe ===
In 2011, DHP Group, the owners of Nottingham's Rock City venue, took over management of the band. In March they appeared as themselves on the British TV teen drama Skins after the scriptwriter saw them at Glastonbury. The closing scene of the fifth series featured the band in a marquee playing "Glockenspiel Song", with most of the series' characters joining in the song's chant: "We are a mess. We are failures and we love it". The episode, first broadcast on channel E4 in March 2011, also included "Young" as background music during the wedding scene. Shortly after, they were signed by Atlantic Records, who released a collection of their previously available songs on the "Your Childhood" EP. This was followed by two new singles: "River Jordan" and "Hands Down". During 2011 Lawrence Libor decided to leave the band to pursue a career in theatre, later writing and performing music as a solo artist under the name "Clay Shaped Boy". He was replaced on drums by Daniel Harvey. The band continued to tour extensively, both as a headline act and as support for Bombay Bicycle Club and Viva Brother. They performed at several UK festivals (Bestival, Latitude Festival, Leeds Festival, Reading Festival, Isle of Wight Festival), Paris (Festival des Inrockuptibles) and Amsterdam.

=== 2012–2014: Two Devils, Glockenspiel rerelease, Debut Album ===
Their third Atlantic Records release, "Two Devils", was accompanied by a much darker video matching the title. A rerecorded version of "Glockenspiel Song" was released in July. Atlantic Records released their debut album, All Our Favourite Stories on 8 October.

=== 2014–2016: D.I.D ===
In 2014, the band changed their name from "Dog Is Dead" to the abbreviation "D.I.D", usually rendering the first D backwards: "ᗡ.I.D". The first track released under the new name was "Hotel" (10 November 2014). The band continued to write and tour, releasing the EP Fast Food in 2015, and their second album, The State We're In, in December 2016.

== Discography ==
=== Albums ===
- All Our Favourite Stories (Your Childhood/Atlantic Records - October 2012) UK Album Chart position - 45
- The State We’re In (December 2016)

=== Extended Plays (EPs) ===
- Dog Is Dead (Promotional release - April 2009)
  - "The Zoo"
  - "Board Games"
  - "Clockwork"
- Your Childhood (Atlantic Records - May 2011)
  - "Young"
  - "A Motel"
  - "River Jordan"
  - "Glockenspiel Song"
- Confessions (Promotional Release - September 2011)
  - "Young (Acoustic)"
  - "Head in Your Hands (Acoustic)"
  - "River Jordan (Acoustic)"

=== Singles ===
Year	Title	Chart Positions	Album
Year	Title	UK	Album
2010	"Glockenspiel Song (original release)"	–	
2010	"Young"	–	
2011	"River Jordan"	–	All Our Favourite Stories
2011	"Hands Down"	–	All Our Favourite Stories
2012	"Two Devils"	–	All Our Favourite Stories
2012	"Glockenspiel Song (re-release)"	–	All Our Favourite Stories
2012	"Talk Through the Night"	–	All Our Favourite Stories
2012	"Teenage Daughter"	–	All Our Favourite Stories
2014	"Hotel"	–	The State We're In
2015	"Fast Food"	–	The State We're In
