= Sound of Guns =

English alternative rock band

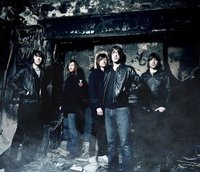
- Sound Of Guns standing in the ashes of their original practice room located in Allerton, Liverpool.

Background information
- Origin: Liverpool, England
- Genres: Alternative rock, rock, indie rock
- Years active: 2008–2013
- Label: Distiller Records (UK)
- Members: Andrew Metcalfe; Lee Glynn; Nathan Crowley; John Coley; Simon Finley
- Website: https://www.facebook.com/soundofguns/

Sound of Guns were an English alternative rock band from Liverpool, England, who were formed in 2008. Discovered by BBC Introducing the band went on to sign with independent record label Distiller Records through which they released their debut album What Came From Fire on 28 June 2010 and second album Angels and Enemies on 5 March 2012.

In early 2012 the band announced a full UK and European tour to coincide with the release of their second album.

In October 2013, the band announced that they were to go on an indefinite hiatus. The band cited that they were going on to "focus on other commitments/projects" via their official Facebook page.

Lee Glynn now fronts UK rock band Shadow Mountains.

On October 28, 2025, Sound of Guns announced via their official facebook page, that frontman Andrew Metcalfe had died, with hundreds of tributes pouring in from fans worldwide. The Liverpool Echo also paid tribute to the band in a post online.

== History ==
=== Early years ===
After Andrew Metcalfe and Simon Finley's band split up in the summer of 2007, the pair set up a small studio in a disused social club in Liverpool and spent the next few months writing and recording some new material. At the end of 2007 they were introduced to Nathan Crowley, whose previous band had recently ended too. By the start of 2008, the three had begun writing and recording songs together, some of which would eventually end up on Sound of Gun's debut album 'What Came From Fire'. In need of other musicians to complete the line-up, Crowley played the new recordings for Lee Glynn, a guitarist with whom he had played previously. Glynn had made plans to return home to his family in Perth, Western Australia, but on hearing the recordings, decided to stay and join Sound of Guns on guitar.

After a few months of writing and rehearsing as a four-piece, the band booked their first shows. After several unsuccessful auditions for a bass player, they decided to go ahead with the shows, and have the bass parts recorded to a backing track until they found the right bass player. It was at their first hometown show at the Barfly in Liverpool that the Sound of Guns line-up was completed. John Coley, a friend of Nathan Crowley, was in the crowd that night, and was so impressed with the raw energy and powerful performance from Sound of Guns that he joined the band there and then.

Over the next few months, the band gigged endlessly around the country and carried on recording new material as a five-piece. By the end of 2008 they self-released their debut single "Alcatraz", which was recorded and produced by the band, and gained a fair amount of major radio airplay, including on XFM and Radio 1.

=== Distiller Records ===
After more writing and touring, the band soon found themselves at the centre of some serious interest from major and independent record companies. During this time, Distiller Records offered to release their next single. The band took up this offer, and "Architects" was released in June 2009 as a limited edition 7" vinyl, again gaining radio airplay. The band then headed out on tour in support of this release, and played numerous shows which included four gigs at Glastonbury Festival, opening the main stage at Latitude Festival and BBC Radio 1's Big Weekend. The band were invited by BBC Radio 1 to perform four songs at the Maida Vale Studios.

After signing a record contract with Distiller Records the band set about writing towards their debut release. On 26 October 2009 Sound of Guns released their first EP, Elementary of Youth, through Distiller Records. It was available on a 7" gatefold single, which included a CD, the band's own fanzine Retail Rodeo and digital download. It consisted of four tracks, "Elementary of Youth", "Lightspeed" (both mixed by Dave Eringa (Manic Street Preachers/Idlewild)), "Dead Sea Scrolls" and "Gallantry". The lead track "Elementary of Youth" was quickly picked up by BBC Radio 1's Zane Lowe and given the title of 'Hottest Record in the World' as well as XFM's 'Single of the Week' by Steve Harris.

== Controversy ==
During a UK tour in March 2009 Sound of Guns found themselves surrounded by armed police in Wakefield after a mix up involving the band's name led to the group being mistaken for gangsters, as reported by NME.

== What Came From Fire ==
After touring in support of the Elementary of Youth EP, the band headed into the studio to record their debut album. However, instead of using a commercial studio, the band opted to build their own studio using the advance from their record contract, and spent the end of 2009 recording their debut album, producing it themselves. The album was mixed by Chris Potter (The Verve, U2) in January 2010 and was released in June 2010, titled What Came From Fire.

It was preceded by two more single releases, "Alcatraz" in April 2010 and "Architects" in June 2010. Both were new versions of the songs and were not limited editions this time round. "Architects" reached Number 1 on the HMV 7" Singles Chart, and was playlisted by BBC Radio 1 daytime and XFM daytime. BBC Radio 1 also gave the track 'Single of the Week' (Greg James) and XFM 'Single of the Week' (Steve Harris).

The album was short listed for the 'XFM new music award' in 2011 and highlighted as one of the albums of the year.

=== Track list ===
All tracks are written by Sound of Guns.

No.	Title	Length
1.	"Intro"	0:40
2.	"Architects"	2:59
3.	"Alcatraz"	3:39
4.	"Elementary of Youth"	3:15
5.	"Collisions"	4:14
6.	"106 (Still The Words)"	6:23
7.	"Lightspeed"	3:39
8.	"My White Noise"	4:18
9.	"Bullets in the Bloodstream"	3:35
10.	"Backs of Butterflies"	4:53
11.	"Starts With an End"	3:56
12.	"Magnesium Seas (Digital Only Track)"	4:49
Total length:		46:29

In late 2010 the band announced they would release the single and accompanying EP via the band's website. In support of this they also announced a UK tour with The View. The EP Was released in 2011.

== Angels and Enemies ==
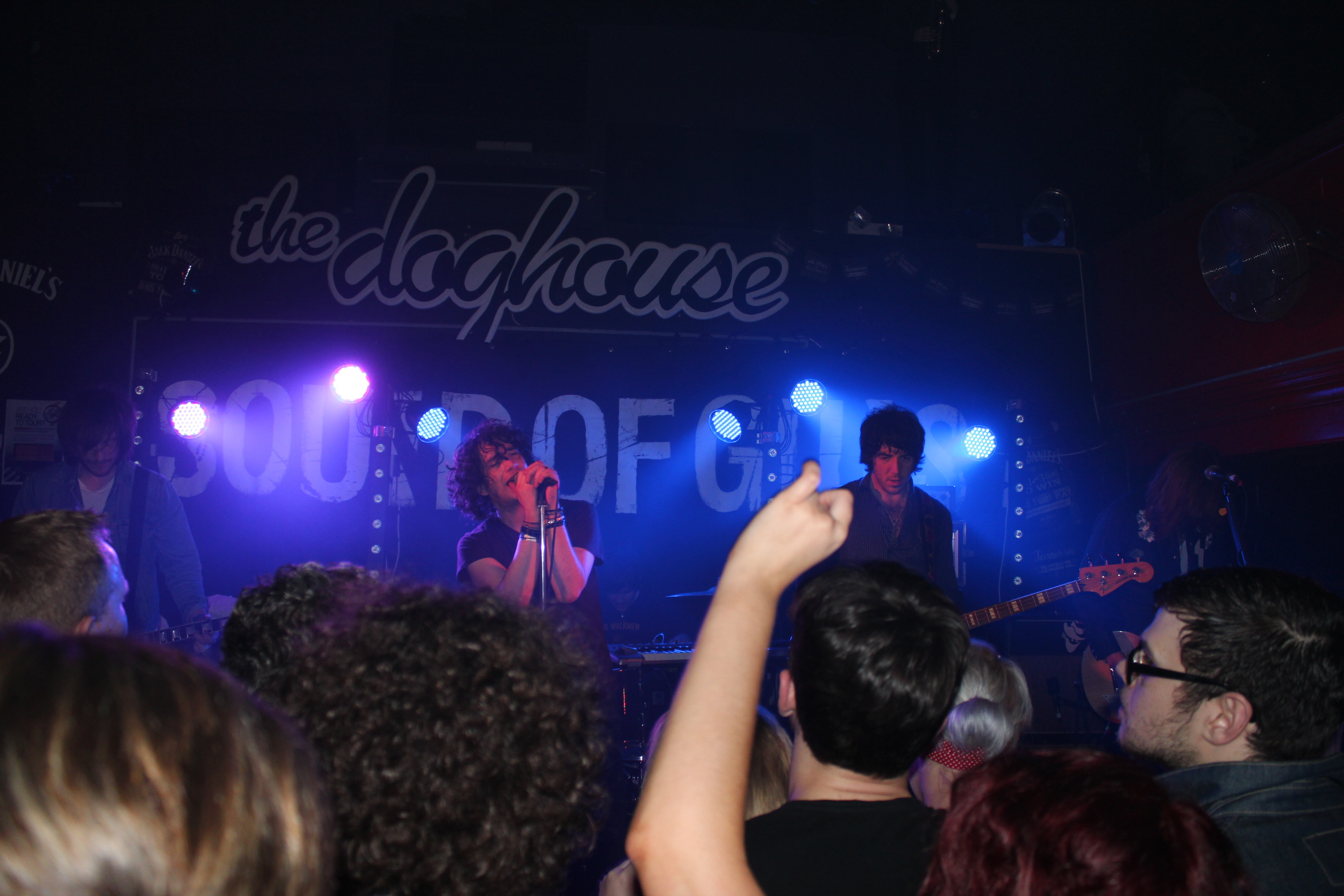
Sound of Guns performing in Dundee, March 2012

In early 2011 the band started writing new material for their follow-up to What Came From Fire, and headed into the studio with record producer Dave Eringa (Manic Street Preachers, Ocean Colour Scene, Idlewild) to record material for the album.

The band recorded the album at The Distillery in Bath.

The first single to be released from the album was "Silicon", released as part of an EP which included tracks that never made it onto the album, rare demos and acoustic tracks from What Came From Fire. Also as part of the EP the band teamed up with Pledge to offer exclusive one-off and VIP experiences, limited edition t-shirts, hand written lyric sheets and jam in rehearsals with band. All exclusive pledgers were given a free download of all of the tracks on the EP.

The second single "Sometimes" was released on the same day as the album and has been championed by BBC Radio 1 (Zane Lowe) and XFM (Mary Anne Hobbs). The song "Sometimes" became a viral hit thanks to its appearance on the Martyn AShton Road Bike Party video. The song, along with "Alcatraz" is now associated with many extreme sports videos on YouTube including the Turbolenza: We are not crazy... WE ARE AMAZING! video.

Angels and Enemies was released to critical acclaim. FMV Magazine's Dan Jenko described the record as "an excellent return for Sound of Guns: one that not only gives their die-hard fans the crowd-pleasing anthems they wanted, but also provides another stepping stone as they attempt to break into the mainstream fold".

The iTunes bonus track "Violets" was a fan favourite, yet was only played once at the band's final gig at Whitehaven Civic Hall on 11 October 2013.

On 16 April 2016, Astronaut Tim Peake played Sound Of Guns’ Antarctica single while orbiting Earth, tweeting them from space.

=== Track list ===
All tracks are written by Sound of Guns.

No.	Title	Length
1.	"Sometimes"	4:22
2.	"Antarctica"	4:09
3.	"The Oceans, The Rivers, The Seas"	4:18
4.	"Flash of Light"	4:31
5.	"Whites of Your Eyes"	4:23
6.	"Silicon"	2:58
7.	"Guide"	4:20
8.	"End of the World"	3:31
9.	"The Leaning"	4:54
10.	"Of Our Own Invention"	5:01
11.	"Violets (Digital Only Track)"	4:40
Total length:		47:07

== Members ==
- Andrew Metcalfe - lead vocals (died 2025)
- Lee Glynn - guitar
- Nathan Crowley - guitar
- John Coley - bass
- Simon Finley - drums
