= Page 44 =

English indie rock band

- Origin: Birmingham, England
- Genres: Powerpop indie rock pop rock
- Years active: 2004–2015
- Labels: Unsigned
- Members: Adam Vygus; Adam Stanford; Zach Phelps; Jay Brown
- Past members: Paul Bugden; Elliot Vaughan; Laurent Gillgrass; Samuel Wilson; Mark Rabone
- Website: Page 44 On Myspace; Page 44 on Facebook

Page 44 were an English indie rock band formed in Birmingham, England, in 2004.

They have opened for bands such as Boy Kill Boy, Captain Phoenix, The Standards, & The Red Jumpsuit Apparatus. BBC said the band might become "tomorrow's superstars".

== Early years ==
The band has appeared on national TV, namely Channel 4's Popworld in 2006, where they were interviewed by Alex Zane as well as performed live to over half a million viewers. They made their appearance on the show because the show's viewers voted their song "The Grey Room" as their favorite at the time.

In 2006, they came in 2nd out of 1,000 bands in the national Emergenza live band competition. In 2007, the band was crowned the best unsigned band in the Midlands. The band won the title of Carling Supports Champions for Birmingham again in October 2007. In 2006, they were crowned Champions of the Midlands Emergenza Live Band competition and went on to finish second in the Emergenza UK National Final. The competition, which was judged by Sony, Universal, Interscope, and NME, took place in London.

Many fans discovered Page 44 after downloading the song "We Know The Way", (improperly credited to +44 on P2P networks such as Kazaa and Limewire.)

Page 44 "We Know The Way" (2004)
36 second sample of Page 44's Song "We Know The Way"

When asked about what genre Page 44 falls into, Adam Stanford has said the band's music spans over many genres, from alternative rock to indie, and has described their overall sound as "energetic rock". Page 44 falls into many other subgenres, such as power pop.

The latest lineup included Adam Stanford on Guitar and Vocals, Adam "Viggy" Vygus on lead Vocals and Guitar, Zach Phelps on Bass and backup vocals, & Jay Brown on drums.

The original bassist Paul Bugden left in early 2007, and was replaced by Samuel Wilson. The original drummer, Elliot Vaughan had a falling out with the band and left in 2007. Shortly after, he was replaced by Laurent "Lozz" Gillgrass, who left the band in early 2008, and was replaced by Mark Rabone. In 2009, bassist and backing vocalist Samuel Wilson left the band to attend college, and was replaced by Zach Phelps. Drummer Mark Robone left in 2010 and was replaced by Jay Brown.

== Later years ==
Their single, "With or Without Your Help", was produced by Joe Gibb (who has produced albums for Funeral for a Friend, Million Dead & Brigade), is available for download on iTunes. Three new songs, from the Mini-EP Crash Factory Sessions, were put up on the band's Myspace in late April 2008. The songs include "No Truth at All", "To Make You Proud", and a re-recording of "Watch Me Fade". On 13 June 2008 they headlined at the Carling Academy in Burmingham. The band's newest single "Answers" came out on 27 July 2009, released digitally on iTunes and other online mediums.

In 2011, Page 44 won the Red Bull Band Jam, winning a chance to tour with The Blackout and We Are The Ocean, as well as earning time in the Red Bull recording studio.

As a result of this, Page 44 also had their EP Leave The Last Man Behind, produced by Red Bull Studios in London, released for free courtesy of Rock Sound Magazine in December 2011.

Page 44 began recording their debut album, All That Changes, Stays the Same in January 2013. The album was crowdfunded through PledgeMusic and is released on 25 March 2013. The band toured areas of England in support of the album in early 2013. They also played on the UK leg of Vans Warped Tour in November 2013.

== Discography ==
Studio albums

- All That Changes, Stays the Same (2013)

Extended Plays

- With or Without Your Help (2007)
- Crash Factory Sessions (2008)
- Answers (2009)

Demo releases

- A Slice of Fried Gold (2004)
- The Grey Room (2005)
