= Yaaks =

- Origin: Eastbourne, England
- Genres: Dance-punk, math pop, indie pop
- Years active: 2010–2012
- Label: Unsigned
- Members: Christopher Woodgates; Robert Geraghty; Max Sztyber; Joshua Donald
- Website: http://www.yaaks.co.uk

Yaaks were an English dance-punk quintet from Eastbourne, United Kingdom. They are known for their distinctive guitar-led, soundscaped dance music kept within a pop context. A highly elusive and secretive band until recent months, the band have since been likened to such artists as Talking Heads, Friendly Fires and U2.

== Biography ==
Yaaks formed in October 2010, with the band having a collective admiration for the French philosopher Jean-Jacques Rousseau, Balearic beat and Pop music. Just one month later in November 2010, the band's first home demo of their track "HRHRHYTHM" was given its first airplay by Zane Lowe on BBC Radio 1. In 2011 the track received heavy airplay rotation on the BBC Radio 1 playlist's by DJs Zane Lowe, Huw Stephens, Rob da Bank, Fearne Cotton, Scott Mills and Greg James. On hearing "HRHRHYTHM", DJ Rob da Bank announced on his Radio 1 show that the band were "The future of music", a high accolade for a band so young.

The band followed up the early radio success by releasing the single "HRHRHYTHM" for free through their social networking sites on Facebook and Myspace. The band began promoting the single through touring as a support for bands such as The Naked and Famous and Funeral Party at various venues around the United Kingdom. In March 2011, Yaaks were presented as The Guardian′s New band of the day, being announced as the country's hottest new unsigned band of the moment.

== Discography ==
=== Singles ===
- "HRHRHYTHM" (White Label / Free Download) – March 2010
- Untitled Album (Free Download) – March 2012
