= Sub Club =

Venue in Glasgow City, Scotland

Coordinates: 55.857°N 4.257°W

- Interactive map of Sub Club
- Location: Glasgow, United Kingdom
- Type: Bar, Music venue, Nightclub

Construction
- Opened: 1 April 1987

Website
- Sub Club

The Sub Club is a club and music venue located at 22 Jamaica Street in Glasgow, Scotland. It opened 1 April 1987 and is the longest running underground dance club in the world. The 3,500-square-foot (330 m^{2}) basement space can legally hold up to 410 people. In 2008 it was voted the 10th best club in the world by Resident Advisor (and 5th for atmosphere) and the 30th best club in the world by DJ Mag. In 2009 the club was placed 14th best in the world by DJ Mag.

I love the Sub Club. I've had some amazing nights there over the years. Whatever genre of music it hosts, it always pulls along a great crowd of party animals who really know their stuff.

— Irvine Welsh, The Daily Record

== History ==
In 1999 a fire in the pub next door spread, damaging the club, which along with the accidental demolition of one of the club's walls, forced it to close until 2002.

In 2006 the largest bodysonic dancefloor in the UK was installed, with clubs such as Fabric also using such technology.

The long-standing Subculture residents are Harri and Domenic, mainstays every Saturday since 1990, with JD Twitch and JG Wilkes' Optimo (espacio) every Sunday from 1997 to 2010. Other regular nights include Numbers, Return To Mono, Sensu and I Am.

The club has played host to world-renowned artists such as LCD Soundsystem and Derrick May as well as many locals including:

- Sons and Daughters who played for Optimo's 12th Birthday in 2009;
- Franz Ferdinand who played in 2003;
- and Primal Scream who played their first gig in the club.

== See also ==
- List of electronic dance music venues
