= Optimo =

Club in Glasgow, Scotland

Coordinates: 55.8573°N 4.2571°W

A badge of the club.

Optimo Espacio ('Optimum Space') was a weekly Sunday-night club based in Glasgow, Scotland at the Sub Club on Jamaica Street, as well as a collective moniker for the night's resident DJ duo. Having run every week since it was founded in 1997, on 11 March 2010, it was announced on the official Facebook page that the weekly nights would come to an end on Sunday 25 April 2010. However, JD Twitch and JG Wilkes continued to tour, promote and release music as Optimo.

Often known simply as Optimo, the club takes its name from the eponymous Liquid Liquid song and 1983 EP title. JD Twitch and JG Wilkes (real names Keith McIvor and Jonnie Wilkes), the club's founders and resident DJs, are also collectively known as Optimo and have toured in Europe, America, Australia and Japan and released music under that name. In 2011 they visited China to play Split Works' inaugural Black Rabbit festival. Renowned for its diverse music policy, the club retains a reputation for adventurous innovation and hedonism. The technical side of the club has been written about in The Guardian. Twitch and Wilkes were described by Pitchfork Media in 2006 as being "one of the best DJ duos going right now."

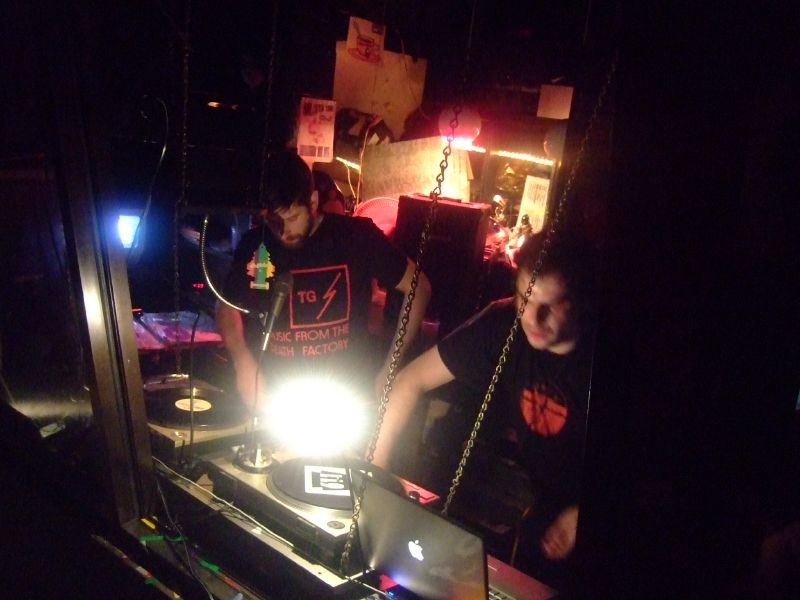
Optimo

In November 2006, Optimo appeared on BBC Radio 1's "Essential Mix."

Optimo regularly receives reviews from the media. For example, The Skinny published an article in December 2006 saying that Optimo is "still one of Scotland's best and most charismatic nights" and awarded it a "shiny gold star." In another article from the same magazine, the Optimo DJs were described as having a "special talent for mixing every genre under the sun."

Many well established music artists have played at Optimo. Examples include Cut Copy, Franz Ferdinand, The Rapture, Peaches, Isolée, Shitdisco, Chicks on Speed, Liquid Liquid, LCD Soundsystem, Hot Chip, Richie Hawtin, The Long Blondes, The Presets, TV on the Radio, The Go! Team, The Kills, Sons and Daughters, Ivan Smagghe and Datarock.

== Record label ==
Optimo started a new record label called Optimo Music in January 2009, with a 7" of Big Ned's "Bad Angel/Killer". Other releases include Den Haan, Dollskabeat, Divorce, Older Lover, Chris Carter and Factory Floor. Prior to this Optimo owned the Optimo Singles Club And Related Recordings (OSCarr) label, having released records by Glaswegian artists such as Creme Du Menthe, Park Attack, Bis, Pro Forma, Magic Daddy and Findo Gask.

In 2017, Optimo released Lo Kindre's "Plant Up" and Iona Fortune's "Tao of I".

As of March 2025 the label has spawned sub-labels Optimo Music Digital Danceforce, Optimo Trax, So Low, and Against Fascism Trax collectively releasing over 200 releases.

JD Twitch's death was announced on 20 September 2025.

== Discography ==
=== Mix albums ===
- How To Kill The DJ (Part Two) - Various (2004) Kill the DJ/Tigersushi Records
- Optimo Present Psyche Out - Various (2005) Eskimo Recordings
- Walkabout - Various (2006) Mule Musiq
- Sub Club 20 Years Underground - Various (2008) Soma
- Sleepwalk - Various (2008) Domino
- Fabric 52 - Various (2010) Fabric
