= Sleepthief discography =

- Studio albums: 3
- Singles: 7
- Remixes: 7

This is the discography of the American electronic music project Sleepthief.

== Albums ==
=== The Dawnseeker ===
The Dawnseeker

Studio album by Sleepthief
- Released: June 27, 2006
- Genre: Electronic, pop
- Label: Neurodisc
- Producer: Justin Elswick, Israel Curtis

All songs written by Elswick and the vocalist featured except where otherwise noted.

No.	Title	Writer(s)	Length
1.	"Eurydice" (featuring Jody Quine)	Curtis, Elswick, Quine	4:47
2.	"Desire of Ages" (featuring Shelley Harland)	Curtis, Elswick, Harland, James Harland-Wright	6:49
3.	"You Did a Good Thing" (featuring Nicola Hitchcock, formerly of Mandalay)	Curtis, Elswick, Eric Harris, Hitchcock	4:26
4.	"Just Say It" (featuring Kyoko Baertsoen of Lunascape)	Curtis, Elswick, Baertsoen	4:59
5.	"The Chauffeur" (featuring Kirsty Hawkshaw; original by Duran Duran)	Curtis, Elswick, Hawkshaw, Duran Duran	4:53
6.	"Tenuous" (featuring Jody Quine)	Curtis, Elswick, Quine	4:07
7.	"Sublunar (Sweet Angel)" (featuring Kristy Thirsk)	Curtis, Elswick, Thirsk	4:54
8.	"Nightjar" (featuring Caroline Lavelle)	Curtis, Elswick, Lavelle	3:31
9.	"Fire from Heaven" (featuring Roberta Carter Harrison of Wild Strawberries)	Curtis, Elswick, Harrison	4:11
10.	"The Metro" (featuring Jerri Eckert; original by Berlin)	Curtis, Elswick, Eckert, John Crawford, Berlin	4:35
11.	"Kiss to Savor" (featuring Jody Quine)	Curtis, Elswick, Quine	5:02
12.	"Afterthoughts" (featuring Lauren Edman)	Curtis, Elswick, Edman	3:47
13.	"Entre Ciel et Mer" (featuring San.Drine)	Curtis, Elswick, Harris, Sandrine Ligabue	4:44

=== Labyrinthine Heart ===
Labyrinthine Heart

Studio album by Sleepthief
- Released: August 31, 2009
- Genre: Electronic, pop
- Label: Neurodisc
- Producer: Justin Elswick, Israel Curtis

No.	Title	Writer(s)	Length
1.	"Here I Confess" (featuring Joanna Stevens of Solar Twins)	Curtis, Elswick, Stevens	4:26
2.	"World Gone Crazy" (featuring Coury Palermo)	Curtis, Elswick, Palermo, Vic Levak	3:54
3.	"Skimming Stones (Reprise)" (featuring Kirsty Hawkshaw)	Curtis, Elswick, Hawkshaw, Joshua Aker	3:49
4.	"Labyrinthine Heart" (featuring Jody Quine)	Curtis, Elswick, Quine, Aker	4:07
5.	"A Kind of Magic" (featuring Zoë Johnston)	Curtis, Elswick, Johnston	4:02
6.	"A Cut From the Fight" (featuring Kristy Thirsk)	Curtis, Elswick, Thirsk, Aker	3:50
7.	"Rainy World" (featuring Caroline Lavelle)	Curtis, Elswick, Lavelle	5:10
8.	"Ariadne (The Dividing Sea)" (featuring Joanna Stevens)	Curtis, Elswick, Lavelle, Levak	3:48
9.	"Reason Why" (featuring Coury Palermo and Zoë Johnston)	Curtis, Elswick, Palermo, Johnston	4:26
10.	"Fire King" (featuring Jody Quine)	Curtis, Elswick, Quine, Levak	3:29
11.	"Reversals" (featuring Kristy Thirsk)	Curtis, Elswick, Thirsk	4:00
12.	"There's Something Going On" (featuring Roberta Carter-Harrison)	Curtis, Elswick, Carter-Harrison, Russ Ballard, Ken Harrison	4:34

=== Mortal Longing ===
Mortal Longing

Studio album by Sleepthief
- Released: August 17, 2018
- Genre: Electronic, pop
- Label: Neurodisc
- Producer: Justin Elswick, Israel Curtis

Sleepthief's third full-length album, Mortal Longing, was released on August 17, 2018. A crowd-funding campaign to raise $40,000 for the third album was launched on June 28, 2013, which raised around $10,000. Kirsty Hawkshaw, Caroline Lavelle, Coury Palermo, Carla Werner, Jody Quine, Kristy Thirsk, Sonja Drakulich, Roberta Harrison, Andrea Gerak, Phildel, Marcella Detroit and Sandra Jill Alikas-St. Thomas were potential singers for the album.

All songs written by Curtis, Elswick and the vocalist featured except where otherwise noted.

No.	Title	Writer(s)	Length
1.	"Airmid" (featuring Stine Grove)	Curtis, Elswick, Grove	4:27
2.	"The Sandshaper" (featuring Kirsty Hawkshaw)	Curtis, Elswick, Hawkshaw	3:55
3.	"Dust & Cloud" (featuring Phildel)	Curtis, Elswick, Phildel	4:06
4.	"The Falcon in the Snow" (featuring Jody Quine)	Curtis, Elswick, Quine	4:28
5.	"Idée Fixe" (featuring Roberta Harrison)	Curtis, Elswick, Harrison	3:38
6.	"Zero Sum" (featuring Coury Palermo)	Curtis, Elswick, Palermo	3:35
7.	"This Means War (Album Version)" (featuring Joanna Stevens)	Curtis, Elswick, Stevens	3:59
8.	"Big in Japan" (original by Alphaville) (featuring Kyoko Baertsoen)	Curtis, Elswick, Alphaville, KYOKO	3:41
9.	"Alice’s Door" (featuring Zoë Johnston)	Curtis, Elswick, Johnston	5:15
10.	"Bruised by a Breath" (featuring Shelley Harland)	Curtis, Elswick, Harland	3:41
11.	"Mortal Longing" (featuring Jody Quine)	Curtis, Elswick, Quine	3:56
12.	"Asleep in Metropolis" (featuring Caroline Lavelle)	Curtis, Elswick, Lavelle	4:36
13.	"Semblance of Myself" (featuring Julia Beyer)	Curtis, Elswick, Beyer	3:47
14.	"The Wood Beyond the Wall" (featuring Kirsty Hawkshaw)	Curtis, Elswick, Hawkshaw	4:02
15.	"Andromache" (featuring Stine Grove)	Curtis, Elswick, Grove	3:52
16.	"The Kingdom of Summer" (featuring Carla Werner)	Curtis, Elswick, Werner	3:36
17.	"Where the Heart Is" (featuring Phildel)	Curtis, Elswick, Phildel	4:24

== Singles ==
=== "Eurydice" ===
The lead single from The Dawnseeker, "Eurydice", was released in 2006 as a digital download as well as a limited-edition CD single. The track listing for the single is as follows:

No.	Title	Length
1.	"Eurydice (Single Version)" (featuring Jody Quine)	4:47
2.	"Eurydice (Nick Wax's "Orpheus Descending" Mix)"	8:32
3.	"Eurydice (Psychosomatic Remix)"	5:31
4.	"Eurydice (Dark Territory Mix)"	6:02
5.	"Eurydice (Nook and Kranny's "Lost" Remix)"	5:28
6.	"Eurydice (Sensory Gate Remix)"	5:19
7.	"Eurydice (Underworld A Capella Mix)"	4:22

The new "Eurydice" mix was released on August 12, 2012, and is credited to DjMikelD (who did the Angels on Water Mix for the song).

=== "The Chauffeur" ===
The follow-up single, "The Chauffeur", is a cover of the Duran Duran song and was released in 2007 on the same formats. 11 different versions of the song appear on the single, along with a cover of the Scorpions song "Send Me an Angel", with Kristy Thirsk on vocals. A limited edition CD single featuring the music video for "The Chauffeur" was released by Neurodisc soon afterwards.

The track list for the single is as follows:

No.	Title	Length
1.	"The Chauffeur (Original Album Version)" (featuring Kirsty Hawkshaw)	4:54
2.	"The Chauffeur (Psychosomatic Mix)"	4:55
3.	"The Chauffeur (Flipside's Remix)"	5:46
4.	"The Chauffeur (Seize Puts on the Brakes Mix)"	6:07
5.	"The Chauffeur (Martin Preston Mix)"	4:25
6.	"The Chauffeur (Lemonsoul Deep Hous Mix)"	9:35
7.	"The Chauffeur (Sapphirecut with Dave Shaffer Mix)"	5:17
8.	"The Chauffeur (Nick Wax's Drifting Haze Mix)"	8:52
9.	"The Chauffeur (DJ Vapour Mix)"	6:05
10.	"The Chauffeur (Timo Mae Main Mix)"	6:21
11.	"The Chauffeur (Timo Mae Dub Mix)"	7:33
12.	"Send Me an Angel" (featuring Kristy Thirsk)	4:17

Music videos were filmed for "Tenuous", "Eurydice", and "The Chauffeur".

=== "World Gone Crazy" ===
The lead single from Labyrinthine Heart, "World Gone Crazy", features the vocals of Coury Palermo and was released as a digital download EP on June 30, 2009. It includes the original version as well as several remixed versions and a music video.

No.	Title	Length
1.	"World Gone Crazy (Psychosomatic Radio Mix)"	3:48
2.	"World Gone Crazy (Nick Murray Remix)"	4:35
3.	"World Gone Crazy (Sensory Gate Remix)"	4:11
4.	"World Gone Crazy (Martin Preston Remix)"	7:21
5.	"World Gone Crazy (Coury Palermo Mix)"	3:51

In December 2009, a new version of the World Gone Crazy EP was released.

No.	Title	Length
6.	"World Gone Crazy (Sandro Peres Radio Edit)"	3:51
7.	"World Gone Crazy (Sandro Peres Extended Mix)"	9:15
8.	"World Gone Crazy (Sandro Peres Dubmix)"	9:10
9.	"World Gone Crazy (Sepiamusic Mix)"	4:52
10.	"World Gone Crazy (Nick Wax Mix)"	4:02
11.	"World Gone Crazy (Bryan El Mix)"	9:06
12.	"World Gone Crazy (DJ MikeID "Song of the Fledgling" Mix"	3:57

The track "Skimming Stones", performed with Kirsty Hawkshaw, is a reprised version that was originally released on a compilation album featuring various female vocalists called Sirenes: The Beauty of the Female Voice. A music video was also produced for this track.

=== "Reason Why" ===
The album's next single was "Reason Why", a duet performed by Coury Palermo & Zoë Johnston. A music video has been shot for the track as well, set in the Provo Tabernacle, which was destroyed by a fire in December 2010. Along with several remixes, a new song titled "Asunder" was released. It was performed with the neoclassical/Celtic duo Mirabilis.

The track list is as follows:

No.	Title	Length
1.	"Reason Why" (featuring Zoë Johnston and Coury Palermo)	4:25
2.	"Reason Why (Blue Stone Remix)"	5:10
3.	"Reason Why (Chris Brush Mix)"	4:39
4.	"Reason Why (Bryan El Mix)"	4:24
5.	"Asunder" (featuring Mirabilis)	4:07

=== "Mortal Longing" ===
The title track of the album Mortal Longing was released as the lead single on June 4, 2012, while the digital single and remixes by Psychosomatic, Blue Stone, and DjMikeID were released on June 11, 2012. A music video was released with the single. It was shot in the Goblin Valley State Park in Utah and features Jody Quine and Justin Curtis, Elswick himself in what can be defined a metaphor of the search for love. "a search that not always is happy". Jody Quine had a short insight on the song concept:

"When Justin gave me the title 'Mortal Longing' and the ideas behind it I struggled with how to best embody it lyrically. What I heard and followed was diving into the idea of physical addiction to the point of death almost and yet having it also be the saviour. Choosing the right words that weren't cliche or cheesy can be difficult, but I think I found some very strong and vivid choices that portray the physical responses of being in love and also cry out for breath. Now that the song is out and I know more about where Justin was coming from in his concept, I think I wrote a kick ass song with him. I love you Justin, and I'm always so honoured to work with you, Thank you."

No.	Title	Length
1.	"Mortal Longing (Album Version)"	4:00
2.	"Mortal Longing (Blue Stone Mix)"	3:18
3.	"Mortal Longing (DjMikeID Mix)"	6:22

=== "This Means War" ===
The single "This Means War" was recorded in June 2013 with Joanna Stevens and released as an EP on November 12, 2013, along with a science fiction-themed music video. The track list is as follows:

No.	Title	Length
1.	"This Means War (Psychosomatic Video Mix)"	4:18
2.	"This Means War (Noonatac Ceasefire Remix)"	4:51
3.	"This Means War (Digital Quest Blaster Mix)"	3:49
4.	"This Means War (Adam Amos Remix)"	3:28
5.	"This Means War (Jamie Myerson Remix)"	5:19
6.	"This Means War (L.A.B First Mix)"	4:52
7.	"This Means War (Martron Remix)"	4:51
8.	"This Means War (Elu Evolution Mix)"	4:51

=== "Dust & Cloud" ===
The music video for "Dust & Cloud" was released on July 21, 2014, and the single itself was released on July 28, 2014. The track list is as follows:

No.	Title	Length
1.	"Dust & Cloud" (featuring Phildel)	4:10
2.	"Dust & Cloud (Digital Quest Earth and Sky Remix)"
3.	"Dust & Cloud (Synthetic Substance Remix)"
4.	"Dust & Cloud (Chris Laurent Mix)"
5.	"Dust & Cloud (Matt Hoffman's Pteranodon Mix)"
6.	"Dust & Cloud (From Behind the Clouds Remix)"
7.	"There Is No Greater Sadness" (featuring Andrea Gerak)

The music video for "The Sandshaper" was released on August 17, 2018.

== SoundCloud releases ==
Albums

- Echoes of Winter (2016)

Songs

- "O Come, O Come Emmanuel" (feat. Kristy Hawkshaw, Coury Palermo and Zoë Johnston)
- "Veni Redemptor, Solamen Gentium" (feat. Jana Thompson Ellsworth)
- "Snow" (feat. Zoë Johnston)
- "Tollite Hostias" (feat. Lauralyn Curtis)
- "Ubi Caritas [Altius Mix]" (feat. Kristy Thirsk)
- "What Child Is This?" (feat. Jody Quine)
- "Deus Meus" (feat. Amanda Elswick)

== Remixes ==
- Blue Stone – "Bridges" (Sleepthief remix)
- Balligomingo – "Invitation" (Sleepthief remix)
- Coury Palermo – "Hush" (Sleepthief remix)
- Delerium – "Chrysalis Heart" (Sleepthief remix)
- Eireann Wax – "Here Tonight" (Sleepthief remix)
- Mirabilis – "Sanctuary of Mind" (Sleepthief remix)
- Vanessa Daou – "Black & White" (Sleepthief's L'Eroica mix)
