= Nicola Hitchcock discography =

- Studio albums: 4
- EPs: 1
- Compilation albums: 1
- Singles: 13
- B-sides: 17
- Other appearances: 11

The discography of British singer-songwriter Nicola Hitchcock features four studio albums including two recorded with Saul Freeman for their common project Mandalay. She has also issued one compilation (also with Freeman) and one extended play (as soloist). In addition, Hitchcock has been credited to thirteen singles, seventeen B-sides and eleven other appearances, respectively.

== Albums ==
=== Studio albums ===
Year	Album	Notes
1993	A Bowl of Chalk: Released: 3 May 1993; Label: F-Beat • Demon (#XXCD 23); Format: CD	Twelve-track full-length release issued worldwide. All songs written by Hitchcock, produced by Richard Digby Smith and herself.
1998	Empathy: Released: 23 May 1998; Label: V2 (#VVR1001292); Format: CD	A re-issue from November '98 featured also a bonus remix of "Beautiful".
1998	Empathy: Released: 23 May 1998; Label: V2 (#VVR1001292); Format: CD	None of the albums were issued in the US. In 2001, a local compilation entitled Solace was released instead.
2000	Instinct: Released: 9 October 2000; Label: V2 (#VVR1012392); Format: CD	None of the albums were issued in the US. In 2001, a local compilation entitled Solace was released instead.
2000	Instinct: Released: 9 October 2000; Label: V2 (#VVR1012392); Format: CD	Australian version featured three bonus remixes in addition.
2005	Passive Aggressive: Released: 6 June 2005; Label: Tempted (#TEMPTED001); Format: CD • download	US version included two bonus tracks ("Everything" and acoustic mix of "I Forgive Me"). A 2012 digital self-reissue titled as Passive Aggressive II omitted "Moving into a New Space" in favor of "Everything".
denotes a title credited to Mandalay.

=== Compilation albums ===
Year	Compilation	Notes
2001	Solace: Released: 17 April 2001; Label: V2 (#63881-27094-2); Format: CD • 2×CD (limited, #63881-27093-2)	US-only release featuring selected songs from both Empathy and Instinct albums (six from each) and "I Don't Want the Night to End". A special edition included a bonus CD with 11 remixes in total.
denotes a title credited to Mandalay.

== EPs ==
Year	Extended play	Notes
2012	Quarterbright: Released: 7 November 2012; Label: self-release (#887516032813); Format: Download	Three-track release featuring "A Coeurs Vaillants" and "Magic Heart", apart from the title track.

== Singles ==
Year	Single	Chart positions			Album
Year	Single	UK	CAN	US Dance	Album
1984	"Only in the Night" (with Eternal Triangle)	—	—	—	Touch and Let Go
1984	"Nothing but a Friend " (with Eternal Triangle)	—	—	—	Touch and Let Go
1993	"Pick Up Your Coat"	—	—	—	A Bowl of Chalk
1993	"My Mistake"	—	—	—	A Bowl of Chalk
1996	"Flowers Bloom"	125	—	—	Empathy
1997	"This Life"	—	—	—	Empathy
1998	"Flowers Bloom" (reissue)	158	—	—	Empathy
1998	"Beautiful"	—	—	10	Empathy
2000	"Deep Love"	—	—	—	Instinct
2000	"Not Seventeen"	—	—	29	Instinct
2002	"In My Memory" (with DJ Tiësto)	—	15	12	In My Memory
2003	"Can You Find the Heart" (with Ananda Project)	—	—	15	Morning Light
2014	"Faced with Nothing" (with Steve Jansen)	—	—	—	non-album song
denotes a title credited to Mandalay.

=== B-sides ===
Year	B-side	Single	Album
1984	"Remote Control" (with Eternal Triangle)	"Only in the Night"	non-album song(s)
1984	"Nothing but Nicky" (with Eternal Triangle)	"Nothing but a Friend"	non-album song(s)
1993	"Is That Love" (with Chris Difford)	"Pick Up Your Coat"	non-album song(s)
1993	"Flowers for You"	"Pick Up Your Coat"	non-album song(s)
1993	"Pictures of Innocence"	"My Mistake"	non-album song(s)
1993	"Anyone Who Had a Heart"	"My Mistake"	non-album song(s)
1996	"Sold"	"Flowers Bloom"	non-album song(s)
1997	"Please"	"This Life"	Mandalay Press Pack (promo-only box set)
1997	"Running Down"	"This Life"	Mandalay Press Pack (promo-only box set)
1998	"You Say"	"Flowers Bloom" (reissue)	non-album song(s)
1998	"Sleep"	"Flowers Bloom" (reissue)	non-album song(s)
1998	"Safer Now"	"Beautiful"	non-album song(s)
1998	"Imploded"	"Beautiful"	non-album song(s)
2000	"However Wrong"	"Deep Love"	non-album song(s)
2000	"Blame It on the Sun" (by Stevie Wonder)	"Deep Love"	non-album song(s)
2000	"I Don't Want the Night to End"	"Not Seventeen"	Solace
2000	"To See Her"	"Not Seventeen"	non-album song
denotes a title credited to Mandalay.

=== Other appearances ===
Year	Guest appearance	Notes
1984	"Touch and Let Go" (with Eternal Triangle)	Additional tracks recorded for the only album of the band Touch and Let Go, released through Situation Two/Beggars Banquet (#SITU 9), with featuring her backing vocals (excluding "It's a Story") and keyboards. Other members included Steve Skolnik of Fischer-Z (lead vocals and keyboards), Alasdair Gowans (bass), David Austin (guitars and drums programming) and Eddy Case (live drums). Produced by Nick Griffiths.
1984	"I Need You" (with Eternal Triangle)	Additional tracks recorded for the only album of the band Touch and Let Go, released through Situation Two/Beggars Banquet (#SITU 9), with featuring her backing vocals (excluding "It's a Story") and keyboards. Other members included Steve Skolnik of Fischer-Z (lead vocals and keyboards), Alasdair Gowans (bass), David Austin (guitars and drums programming) and Eddy Case (live drums). Produced by Nick Griffiths.
1984	"Small Town" (with Eternal Triangle)	Additional tracks recorded for the only album of the band Touch and Let Go, released through Situation Two/Beggars Banquet (#SITU 9), with featuring her backing vocals (excluding "It's a Story") and keyboards. Other members included Steve Skolnik of Fischer-Z (lead vocals and keyboards), Alasdair Gowans (bass), David Austin (guitars and drums programming) and Eddy Case (live drums). Produced by Nick Griffiths.
1984	"Cant' Blame Me" (with Eternal Triangle)	Additional tracks recorded for the only album of the band Touch and Let Go, released through Situation Two/Beggars Banquet (#SITU 9), with featuring her backing vocals (excluding "It's a Story") and keyboards. Other members included Steve Skolnik of Fischer-Z (lead vocals and keyboards), Alasdair Gowans (bass), David Austin (guitars and drums programming) and Eddy Case (live drums). Produced by Nick Griffiths.
1984	"Stay with You" (with Eternal Triangle)	Additional tracks recorded for the only album of the band Touch and Let Go, released through Situation Two/Beggars Banquet (#SITU 9), with featuring her backing vocals (excluding "It's a Story") and keyboards. Other members included Steve Skolnik of Fischer-Z (lead vocals and keyboards), Alasdair Gowans (bass), David Austin (guitars and drums programming) and Eddy Case (live drums). Produced by Nick Griffiths.
1984	"Same Mistakes" (with Eternal Triangle)	Additional tracks recorded for the only album of the band Touch and Let Go, released through Situation Two/Beggars Banquet (#SITU 9), with featuring her backing vocals (excluding "It's a Story") and keyboards. Other members included Steve Skolnik of Fischer-Z (lead vocals and keyboards), Alasdair Gowans (bass), David Austin (guitars and drums programming) and Eddy Case (live drums). Produced by Nick Griffiths.
1984	"Won't Work" (with Eternal Triangle)	Additional tracks recorded for the only album of the band Touch and Let Go, released through Situation Two/Beggars Banquet (#SITU 9), with featuring her backing vocals (excluding "It's a Story") and keyboards. Other members included Steve Skolnik of Fischer-Z (lead vocals and keyboards), Alasdair Gowans (bass), David Austin (guitars and drums programming) and Eddy Case (live drums). Produced by Nick Griffiths.
1984	"It's a Story" (with Eternal Triangle)	Additional tracks recorded for the only album of the band Touch and Let Go, released through Situation Two/Beggars Banquet (#SITU 9), with featuring her backing vocals (excluding "It's a Story") and keyboards. Other members included Steve Skolnik of Fischer-Z (lead vocals and keyboards), Alasdair Gowans (bass), David Austin (guitars and drums programming) and Eddy Case (live drums). Produced by Nick Griffiths.
1993	Spirit of The Sea (with Shen)	Backing vocals for the album by the quartet
2003	"Untie My Hands" (with S.A.F.)	Appears on their promotional sampler S.A.F. Originals
2006	"You Did a Good Thing" (with Sleepthief)	Appears on the studio set The Dawnseeker
