= Glass Ghost =

Glass Ghost may refer to:

- Glass Ghost (band), known for releasing Idol Omen in 2009
- Glass Ghost (musician), guitarist for Astrovamps
- Glass Ghost (company), a video game development company known for Tank Racer and Eagle One: Harrier Attack

== See also ==
- The Glass Ghost, an EP by Phildel
