= Yes (McAlmont & Butler song) =

1995 single by McAlmont & Butler

Single by McAlmont & Butler

from the album The Sound Of... McAlmont & Butler
- B-side: "Don't Call It Soul"; "How About You?"; "What's the Excuse This Time?"; "Disappointment"
- Released: 15 May 1995
- Genre: Soul
- Length: 4:53 (full version); 4:00 (edit)
- Label: Hut
- Songwriters: David McAlmont; Bernard Butler
- Producers: Bernard Butler; Mike Hedges

McAlmont & Butler singles chronology
"Yes" (1995)	"You Do" (1995)

Audio
- "Yes" on YouTube

"Yes" is the debut single of English music duo McAlmont & Butler, released on 15 May 1995 and later included on their debut album, The Sound Of... McAlmont & Butler. The soul ballad was their first UK hit, peaking at number eight on the UK Singles Chart, and remains their most successful single, selling over 200,000 copies in the United Kingdom to earn a silver sales certification. The song also charted in Ireland, reaching number 24, and in New Zealand, peaking at number 40. British magazine NME ranked the song at number 174 on its list of the "500 Greatest Songs of All Time" in 2014.

== Background ==
Bernard Butler had departed from Suede in acrimonious circumstances. In 2013, Butler spoke to NME about the song's genesis:

"It was the first piece of music I wrote after I left Suede. I wrote it as an instrumental. Everything was in place, but it didn't have the voice... Everything I'd done in the past six months had been really dark. I'd come out of a very sad situation and lost a lot of friends, so it was a very liberating song."

Butler made demo recordings of the music used in the song with Julianne Regan, formerly of All About Eve, singing alternate lyrics. The demo tape is attributed to an act called "Mrs Decorating Bike" with the song titled "What the girl should do?" on the tape. This demos surfaced online in 2023 and were acknowledged by Regan on her twitter account.

David McAlmont had departed his previous band, Thieves, at around the same time that Butler had left Suede. Butler described to the NME how they met:

"I met David at the Jazz Café in Camden and said, 'I've got this song, do you want to try it out?' He came back to me two days later and sang the first verse. He had no second verse, so I just said 'Sing the first one again'... I wanted it to be like a great piece of '60s vinyl."

The song was recorded utilising the Wall of Sound technique, and the lyrics of the song are a thinly disguised attack on their former colleagues.

== Critical reception ==
Reviewing the song in his weekly UK chart column, James Masterton wrote that McAlmont "sings like an angel" and described the song as "one of the most utterly wonderful records you have heard in ages". In a retrospective review, Patrick Corcoran of music website Albumism called McAlmont's vocal performance on the song "incredible" and noted that "Yes" is "perhaps, one of the most joyously uplifting songs of all time". In 2014, NME ranked the song at number 174 on its list of the "500 Greatest Songs of All Time".

== Track listings ==
UK CD1 and European CD single

1. "Yes" (edit) – 4:00
2. "Don't Call It Soul" – 3:56
3. "How About You?" – 5:49

UK CD2

1. "Yes" (full version) – 4:53
2. "What's the Excuse This Time?" – 5:07
3. "Disappointment" – 7:32

UK cassette single

1. "Yes" (edit) – 4:00
2. "Don't Call It Soul" – 3:56
- Another UK cassette was issued including "How About You?" as a bonus track.

== Credits and personnel ==
Credits are taken from the UK CD1 liner notes.

Studio

- Engineered at Chateau de la Rouge Motte (Normandy, France)

Personnel

- David McAlmont – writing, vocals
- Bernard Butler – writing, guitars, "things", string arrangement, production
- Makoto Sakamoto – drums
- Gini Ball – violin
- Jote Osahn – violin
- Anne Stephenson – violin
- Johnny Taylor – violin
- Claire Orsler – viola
- Joss Pook – viola
- Billy McGhee – string arrangement
- Mike Hedges – production
- Ian Grimble – engineering

== Charts ==
Chart (1995)	Peak position
Europe (Eurochart Hot 100)	39
Ireland (IRMA)	24
New Zealand (Recorded Music NZ)	40
Scotland (OCC)	5
UK Singles (OCC)	8

== Sales and certifications ==
Region	Certification	Certified units/sales
United Kingdom (BPI)	Silver	200,000^{‡}
^{‡} Sales+streaming figures based on certification alone.

== Release history ==
Region	Date	Format(s)	Label(s)	Ref.
United Kingdom	15 May 1995	CD; cassette	Hut	
Australia	17 July 1996	CD	Hut	
