= Instinct (Mandalay album) =

Studio album by Mandalay
- Released: October 16, 2000
- Genre: Trip hop, downtempo, chill-out
- Length: 55:47
- Label: V2 Records
- Producer: Michael Ade; Mandalay; Andy Bradfield

Mandalay chronology
Empathy (1998)	Instinct (2000)	Solace (2001)

Singles from Empathy
- 1. "Deep Love" Released: 2000; 2. "Not Seventeen" Released: 2000

Professional ratings
Review scores
Source	Rating
AllMusic	4/5 stars

Instinct is the second and final full-length studio album by English trip hop duo Mandalay, released in 2000 through V2 Records. Two singles were released to help promote the album: "Deep Love" and "Not Seventeen".

== Track listing ==
All tracks are written by Saul Freeman and Nicola Hitchcock

No.	Title	Length
1.	"Not Seventeen"	4:17
2.	"Don't Invent Me"	5:18
3.	"Like Her"	5:23
4.	"Deep Love"	4:46
5.	"No Reality"	4:04
6.	"You Forget"	5:02
7.	"Simple Things"	5:33
8.	"Too Much Room"	4:04
9.	"What If I"	5:38
10.	"It's Enough Now"	4:58
11.	"Believe"	6:37

== Personnel ==
Mandalay

- Saul Freeman - Composition, guitar, bass, synthesizer, piano, sampler, programming
- Nicola Hitchcock - Composition, lyrics, vocals, guitars

Additional musicians

- Jon Hassell - trumpet
- Nick Ignman, Isobel Griffiths - string arrangement
- Gavyn Wright - strings
- Yoad Nevo - guitars, bass, additional keyboards, programming
- Baz Mattie - drums

Production

- Mandalay - Production
- Guy Sigsworth - Production
- Andy Bradfield - Additional Production & Mix
- Michael Ade - Tape edits, recording, mixing
- Russell Evora - Additional recording
- Chris Scard - Additional recording
- Ian Rossiter - Additional recording
- Paul Stoney - Additional recording
- Tom Jenkins - Additional recording
- Simon Burwell - Additional recording
- Tom Coyne - Mastering
- Saul Freeman - Technician

Artwork

- Chris Bigg - Art Direction, design
- Jim Friedman - Photography
- Blinkk - Photography
- Chris Levine, Nick Allen - Artwork design, photography
