= You Do (McAlmont & Butler song) =

1995 single by McAlmont & Butler

Single by McAlmont & Butler

from the album The Sound Of... McAlmont & Butler
- Released: 23 October 1995
- Length: 7:28 (album version); 4:54 (radio edit)
- Label: Hut
- Songwriters: David McAlmont, Bernard Butler
- Producer: Bernard Butler

McAlmont & Butler singles chronology
"Yes" (1995)	"You Do" (1995)	"Falling" (2002)

"You Do" is a song by English musical duo McAlmont & Butler, released on 23 October 1995 as the second single from their debut album, The Sound Of... McAlmont & Butler (1995). The single charted at number 17 on the UK Singles Chart.

== Track listings ==
UK CD1

1. "You Do" (radio edit)
2. "Although"
3. "The Debitor"

UK CD2

1. "You Do"
2. "Tonight"
3. "You'll Lose a Good Thing"

UK cassette single

1. "You Do" (radio edit)
2. "Although"

== Charts ==
Chart (1995)	Peak position
Europe (Eurochart Hot 100)	68
Scotland Singles (Official Charts)	11
UK Singles (Official Charts)	17
