= McAlmont & Butler =

English rock/soul music duo

- Origin: London, England
- Genres: Indie rock, soul
- Years active: 1994–1995; 2002–2004; 2006; 2014–present
- Labels: Hut/Virgin/EMI; Rough Trade
- Members: Bernard Butler; David McAlmont

McAlmont & Butler are an English rock/soul music duo, comprising singer David McAlmont and guitarist Bernard Butler.

== History ==
Formed in 1994, David McAlmont and Bernard Butler had already experienced individual success: Butler as the guitarist in Suede, and McAlmont as a solo singer as well as part of the duo Thieves.

The duo was formed after Butler met McAlmont at the Jazz Café in Camden. He presented the singer with the beginnings of the song "Yes", which was then an instrumental. The single, released in May 1995, was described as "a conceptual masterpiece" and the production likened to that of Phil Spector. In support of "Yes", the duo appeared at London's Hanover Grand in May 1995 (supported by Edwyn Collins) and on Later... With Jools Holland the following month. "Yes" reached number 8 in the UK Singles Chart, and its success encouraged the duo to write and record more material. The follow-up single, "You Do", was released in October 1995. The same month, McAlmont was interviewed by the NME – apparently intoxicated – in which he highlighted how his and Butler's working relationship had deteriorated and they had little communication, as well as accusing Butler of homophobia; he later retracted his comments and issued Butler an apology. In November, The Sound Of... McAlmont & Butler was released as a compilation of the group's recording sessions.

The duo split following the release of the album; the split has been attributed to either McAlmont's NME interview or that from the outset the duo planned to have a limited duration.

=== Reformations ===
After pursuing solo careers for several years, the duo reunited in 2002 and released Bring It Back and two singles – "Falling" and "Bring It Back". The group toured in promotion of the album.

Preparations for a third album were made, although negotiations with EMI Records fell through and the label dropped the band. Despite this, the song "Speed" – taken from the album sessions – was released by Rough Trade Records in 2006.

In 2014, Butler organised two special shows as McAlmont & Butler in aid of the Bobath Centre, a cerebral palsy treatment organisation. The performances were held at the Union Chapel and the Assembly Hall, both in Islington. The duo were supported by The Magic Numbers, and the shows received positive reviews; both The Guardian and the Evening Standard rating them four stars.

In November 2015, the group headlined a UK tour.

== Discography ==
=== Albums ===
Year	Album	UK Albums Chart
1995	The Sound Of... McAlmont & Butler	No. 33
2002	Bring It Back	No. 18

=== Singles ===
Year	Single	UK Singles Chart	Album
1995	"Yes"	No. 8	The Sound Of... McAlmont & Butler
1995	"You Do"	No. 17	The Sound Of... McAlmont & Butler
2002	"Falling"	No. 23	Bring It Back
2002	"Bring It Back"	No. 36	Bring It Back
2006	"Speed"	No. 193	Non-album single
