= The Sound Of... McAlmont & Butler =

Studio album by McAlmont & Butler
- Released: 27 November 1995
- Recorded: 1994–95
- Genre: Britpop; indie rock; soul
- Length: 61:45
- Label: Hut
- Producer: Bernard Butler; Mike Hedges (co-producer)

McAlmont & Butler chronology
The Sound Of... McAlmont & Butler (1995)	Bring It Back (2002)

Singles from The Sound Of... McAlmont & Butler
- 1. "Yes" Released: 15 May 1995; 2. "You Do" Released: 23 October 1995

The Sound Of... McAlmont & Butler is the debut album by English rock and soul duo McAlmont & Butler, released in 1995. Recorded from 1994 to 1995 and released after the duo had split up, the album is essentially a compilation, comprising both of the band's singles—"Yes" and "You Do"—and the B-side tracks thereof, alongside one previously unreleased track, "The Right Thing'".

On 2 October 2015 a deluxe edition of the album, which includes a second disc of unreleased material and a DVD, was released.

== Critical reception ==
Professional ratings
Review scores
Source	Rating
AllMusic	3/5 stars
Alternative Press	4/5
Clash	8/10
The Guardian	5/5 stars
Louder Than War	9/10
Record Collector	4/5 stars
Smash Hits	3/5
The Virgin Encyclopedia of Nineties Music	3/5 stars

The Times concluded that "the monumental climax to the seven-minute-long 'You Do' provides a fitting end both to the album and to a relationship that shook so hard that perhaps it had to shatter."

== Track listing ==
All songs written by David McAlmont and Bernard Butler, except where noted.

1. "Yes" (full version) – 4:53
2. "What's the Excuse This Time?" – 4:13
3. "The Right Thing" – 6:13
4. "Although" – 4:21
5. "Don't Call It Soul" – 3:05
6. "Disappointment / Interval" – 8:57
7. "The Debitor" – 5:11
8. "How About You?" – 4:10
9. "Tonight" – 5:02
10. "You'll Lose a Good Thing" (Huey P. Meaux, Barbara Lynn Ozen) – 4:25
11. "You Do" (full length) – 11:10 (includes hidden track)

== Charts ==
Chart (1995)	Peak position
UK Albums (OCC)	33
