= Empathy (Mandalay album) =

1998 studio album by Mandalay

Studio album by Mandalay
- Released: March 23, 1998
- Studios: Morocco Street; Trident; The Church; Matrix Maison Rouge; Livingstone; Falconer; Angel
- Genres: Trip hop, downtempo, chill-out
- Length: 50:01
- Label: V2
- Producers: Guy Sigsworth; Mandalay

Mandalay chronology
Empathy (1998)	Instinct (2000)

Singles from Empathy
- 1. "Flowers Bloom" Released: 1996; 2. "This Life" Released: October 6, 1997; 3. "Beautiful" Released: 1998

Empathy is the debut full-length studio album by British trip hop duo Mandalay. It was first released on March 23, 1998, through V2 Records. The track "Flowers Bloom" was previously released as a single in 1996 through Organic Music, and the tracks "This Life" and "Beautiful" were both released as singles to promote the album.

== Critical reception ==
Professional ratings
Review scores
Source	Rating
The Sydney Morning Herald	3.5/5 stars

The Sydney Morning Herald wrote: "This is the album Madonna was trying to make with Ray of Light. Sultry without reeking of sex; using trip-hop and similar rhythms as ingredients not the whole recipe; a patina of sadness without mistaking seriousness for worthiness."

== Track listing ==
All tracks are written by Saul Freeman and Nicola Hitchcock.

No.	Title	Length
1.	"This Life"	4:19
2.	"Flowers Bloom"	4:25
3.	"Insensible"	4:47
4.	"Another"	5:57
5.	"Enough Love"	4:06
6.	"All My Sins"	6:16
7.	"Opposites"	5:12
8.	"This Time Last Year"	3:28
9.	"Kissing the Day"	3:49
10.	"Beautiful"	3:33
11.	"About You"	4:11

German Edition Bonus Track
No.	Title	Length
12.	"Beautiful (7" Canny Mix)"	4:27
Total length:		54:28

== Personnel ==
Mandalay

- Saul Freeman - Composition, guitar, bass, synthesizer, piano, sampler
- Nicola Hitchcock - Composition, lyrics, vocals

Additional musicians

- Guy Sigsworth - Electric piano, sampler, synthesizer, piano
- Jim Carmichael - Drums
- Gavin Wright - Strings
- Steve Jansen - Drums, piano, percussion
- Jon Hassell - Trumpet
- Jaak van der Bent - Baritone vocals
- David Watters - Tenor vocals
- Danny Thompson - Double bass
- Warwick Blair - String arrangement on "About You"

Production

- Mandalay - Production
- Guy Sigsworth - Production
- Michael Ade - Tape edits, recording, mixing
- Russell Evora - Additional recording
- Chris Scard - Additional recording
- Ian Rossiter - Additional recording
- Paul Stoney - Additional recording
- Tom Jenkins - Additional recording
- Simon Burwell - Additional recording
- Tom Coyne - Mastering
- Andy Bradfeild - Mixing on "This Life"
- Saul Freeman - Technician

Artwork

- Chris Bigg - Art Direction, design
- Jim Friedman - Photography
- Blinkk - Photography
