= Phildel =

- Born: Phildel Hoi Yee Ng; 1983 (age 42–43); Kensington, London, England
- Genres: Pop; alternative pop; neoclassical; dream pop
- Occupations: Singer-songwriter; musician
- Instruments: Vocals; piano; keyboards; ukulele
- Years active: 2007–present
- Label: Yee Inventions
- Website: phildel.com

Phildel Hoi Yee Ng, better known mononymously as Phildel, is an English singer, pianist and songwriter from London. Her name is a composite of her Chinese father and Irish mother's names (Philip and Della).

== Biography ==
Phildel's parents divorced and her mother married an Islamic fundamentalist. Her name, religion, lifestyle and dress-code were all changed by force. All of her personal possessions were seized, and music became a 'forbidden evil' within the household. This meant no radio, no CD player and no piano. She was renamed Zara. For the next decade, Phildel was treated as a servant within her home.

However, Phildel spent lunchtimes with sympathetic music teachers and the school piano, at the girls' day school in Barnet (Queen Elizabeth's School for Girls). The school became a refuge in which she could write and play her own compositions. She eventually ran away from home at age 17 to escape her home-life and follow her dreams.

She soon purchased a second-hand computer and some music demo software packages and began putting together her first home-demo. Within a short while, it attracted the attention of Roger Watson (a former Chrysalis Music MD), and his support of her music led to collaborations with Spike MaClaren at Massive Attack's studio and Sam Dixon (known for his collaborations with many artists including KT Tunstall and Duffy's 'Rockferry' album).

In 2007, she wrote the piano piece "The Kiss" which was used for a worldwide TV advertising campaign for Apple iPad 3. It was also used for a Marks & Spencer's advert. Her music has also been used in adverts for Persil and Omo washing powder. Another of her tracks "Piano B" was used for an Expedia commercial, followed by two more high-profile filmic campaigns in France in 2008/2009. In 2008, another track, "Everyone's Memory Is Snow" (renamed "A Better World"), was used for the commercial for an insurance company, which Zizou praised.

She said "Four of my tracks have been used in commercials around the world, two of them in the UK. They all came about in different ways, through different individuals, agencies or publishers. But my publisher Warner/Chappell Music have been very proactive in the realm of pitching my music for advertising. I re-invest whatever income I make into top-of-the-range studio equipment and cameras for documenting everything and creating visuals. So, it all goes back into my music." She was complimented on her "sonic soundscapes" by Trevor Horn. Her music has been cited as an inspiration by Mariah Huehner, author of the True Blood and Angel comic books. They have also been used in theatre productions and by celebrity fashion designer Henrietta Ludgate's live shows. She soon returned the favour by wearing Henrietta's dress at a performance at St Pancras Old Church.

During December 2008, Phildel become a Warner/Chappell Music Publishing artist, alongside bands like Radiohead and Goldfrapp.

In the summer of 2010, she performed at the Latitude Festival on the Saturday.

She worked at the world-famous Metropolis Recording Studio, to complete her neo-classical album. Called "Qi" Chinese for Energy. This was then followed by the recording of her artist album (for Decca). Her debut album for Decca The Disappearance of the Girl, was released on 4 March 2013.

She appeared on BBC Breakfast show on Thu 21 March 2013, to promote the album.

She was invited on 23 May 2013 by BBC Radio Merseyside's Dave Monks to his 'Introducing' show after a recommendation from Stevo, she performed acoustic renditions of "Storm Song" and "Holes in Your Coffin".

In the summer of 2013, she collaborated with Sleepthief in America, on his new album "Mortal Longing". The two tracks in which she appeared are "Dust & Cloud" and "Where The Heart Is".

She then performed at Vancouver Folk Music Festival on 20 July, as part of her USA and Canada tour.

In Nov, she collaborated with Peter S. Beagle (author of The Last Unicorn) on a new track 'Dark Water Down', mixing poetry and music. They then appeared together at a gig at Cafe Du Nord in San Francisco, USA.

She was interviewed by Gareth Lloyd on BBC Three Counties Radio as part of 'BBC Introducing'.

She currently lives in the Chilterns, where some of her videos are filmed.

On 4 February 2015 a remastered version of her album Qi was released.

Phildel lives in Brighton and was in relationship with artist and musical collaborator Christophe Young, then on 24 August 2016 Phildel gave birth to twin boys Dylan and Finn.

In May 2019, she released her third album Wave Your Flags after 3 years.

On 5 February 2021 Phildel released an EP called Winterscapes.

On 12 January 2024 Phildel released a single called Child of the Meadow.

On 2 May 2025 Phildel released a single called Wild as Sin.

== Discography ==
=== Studio albums ===
Title	Details
Qi	Released: 1 January 2010; Re-mastered version: 4 February 2015; Label: Yee Inventions; Format: Digital download
The Disappearance of the Girl	Released: 4 March 2013; Label: Decca; Format: Digital download, CD
Wave Your Flags	Released: 17 May 2019; Label: Yee Inventions; Format: Digital download, CD
Into the Woods	Released: 16 February 2024; Label: Yee Inventions; Format: Digital download, CD

=== Extended plays ===
Title	Details	Tracks
The Cut-Throat EP	Released: March 2009; Label: Format: Digital EP	The Wolf; Ghost; Holes in Your Coffin; Slow Cloud; Piano B; Switchblade
Tales from the Moonsea	Released: November 2010; Label: Warner/Chappell Music; Format: Digital EP	Storm Song; Union Stone; Beside You
The Glass Ghost	Released: November 2013; Label: Decca; Format: Digital EP, CD	Heaven: An Introduction; Glass Ghost; Comfort Me; Porcelain; Celestial; Comfort Me (Delerium remix)
Ritual Black	Released: July 2016; Label: Yee Inventions; Format: Digital EP, Patreon Exclusive	Ritual Black; For Whom the Fires Burn; For Whom the Fires Burn (Aethervox Master); Ferris Wheel (DEMO)

=== Singles ===
Year	Title	Album
2012	"The Kiss"	Qi
2013	"Storm Song"	The Disappearance of the Girl
2013	"Comfort Me"	The Glass Ghost
2018	"The Deep"	Wave Your Flags
2019	"Electric Heights"	Wave Your Flags
2019	"Glide Dog"	Wave Your Flags
2019	"Oh Love"	Wave Your Flags
2024	"Child of the Meadow"	Into the Woods
2025	"Wild As Sin"	Wild as Sin

=== Collaborations ===
Year	Title	Artist	Album
2014	"Dust & Cloud"	Sleepthief	Mortal Longing (2018)
2016	"Where the Heart Is"	Sleepthief	Mortal Longing (2018)
2016	"Ritual"	Delerium	Mythologie (2016)
2016	"Zero"	Delerium	Mythologie (2016)
2023	"Coast to Coast"	Delerium	Signs (2023)
