= Bring It Back (McAlmont & Butler album) =

Studio album by McAlmont & Butler
- Released: 12 August 2002
- Genre: Indie rock, soul
- Label: EMI
- Producer: Bernard Butler

McAlmont & Butler chronology
The Sound Of... McAlmont & Butler (1995)	Bring It Back (2002)

Professional ratings
Review scores
Source	Rating
AllMusic	4.5/5 stars
Drowned in Sound	8/10
entertainment.ie	4/5 stars
The Guardian	4/5 stars
Irish Independent	4/5 stars
NME	6/10
The Scotsman	4/5 stars
Stylus Magazine	B+
Sunday Herald	4/5 stars
Sunday Tribune	4/5 stars

Bring It Back is the second album by rock/soul duo McAlmont & Butler, released in 2002 following the reunion of the duo who had split up in 1995. Playlouder ranked the album at number 37 on their list of the top 50 albums of 2002.

== Track listing ==
All songs written by David McAlmont and Bernard Butler.

1. "Theme from 'McAlmont and Butler'" – 5:14
2. "Falling" – 4:13
3. "Different Strokes" – 4:17
4. "Can We Make It" – 3:32
5. "Blue" – 4:52
6. "Bring It Back" – 4:06
7. "Where R U Now?" – 4:04
8. "Sunny Boy" – 3:42
9. "Make It Right" – 4:04
10. "Beat" – 5:58

== Personnel ==
- David Arnold – Conductor, String Arrangements
- Gini Ball – String Arrangements
- Brilliant Strings – Strings
- Jack Brockbank – Assistant
- Bernard Butler – Producer, Engineer, String Arrangements
- Dominic Glover – Saxophone
- Jim Hunt – Horn, Baritone saxophone
- Seb Lewsley – Engineer
- Peter Lockett – Percussion
- Billy McGee – Conductor, String Arrangements
- Makoto Sakamoto – Drums
- Nick Terry – Engineer, Mixdown Engineer
- Felix Tod – Engineer
- Kevin Westenberg – Photography
- Steve White – Drums
- Nick Woolage – Engineer, Mixdown Engineer
