= The Disappearance of the Girl =

Studio album by Phildel
- Released: 18 March 2013
- Recorded: 2011–12
- Genres: Pop, alternative pop, neoclassical
- Length: 56:33
- Label: Decca
- Producer: Ross Cullum

Phildel chronology
The Disappearance of the Girl (2013)	Wave Your Flags (2019)

The Disappearance of the Girl is the debut studio album from British singer-songwriter Phildel. It was released on March 4, 2013, through Decca Records.

Professional ratings
Review scores
Source	Rating
DwfMedia	10/10 stars
StevoMusicMan	9.5/10

== Track listing ==
No.	Title	Producer(s)	Length
1.	"The Disappearance of the Girl"	Ross Cullum	4:08
2.	"Storm Song"	Ross Cullum	3:50
3.	"Mistakes"	Ross Cullum	3:04
4.	"Moonsea"	Ross Cullum	4:08
5.	"Beside You"	Ross Cullum	3:30
6.	"Union Stone"	Ross Cullum	4:17
7.	"Afraid Of The Dark"	Ross Cullum	3:53
8.	"The Wolf"	Ross Cullum	4:30
9.	"Switchblade"	Ross Cullum	4:49
10.	"Holes In Your Coffin"	Ross Cullum	4:07
11.	"Dare"	Ross Cullum	3:53
12.	"Funeral Bell"	Ross Cullum	3:09
Total length:			56:33

Mp3 bonus tracks
No.	Title	Length
13.	"Beside You (Monsieur Adi Remix)"	4:53
14.	"Beside You (Automne Remix)"	4:21
Total length:		56:43

== Notes ==
"Holes In Your Coffin" was originally named 'Coffin Nails' back in 2008. “My imagination is the biggest inspiration for my work,” says Phildel. “In my imagination, I guess because of my past, there’s a lot of dark imagery and sinister feelings."

== Personnel ==
- Phildel Ng - vocals & backing vocals (all tracks); piano (tracks 9, 10, 11, 12); keyboard programming (tracks 1, 3, 6, 7, 12)
- Marky Bates - programming (tracks 1, 2, 3, 4, 6, 7, 8, 9, 10)
- Sean McGhee - programming (tracks 4, 6, 8, 10)
- Ross Collum - programming (track 7)
- Adam Morris - orchestral percussion (tracks 1, 2, 3, 6, 7, 8, 9)
- Adam Falkner - drums (tracks 1, 3, 4, 6, 7, 9, 10)
- Everton Nelson - violin (tracks 1, 2, 3, 4, 5, 7, 8, 9, 10, 11)
- Richard George - violin (tracks 1, 2, 3, 4, 5, 7, 8, 9, 10, 11)
- Rita Manning - violin (tracks 1, 2, 3, 4, 5, 7, 8, 9, 10, 11)
- Mark Berrow Boguslaw Kostecki - violin (tracks 1, 2, 3, 4, 5, 7, 8, 9, 10, 11)
- Ian Humphries - violin (tracks 1, 2, 3, 4, 5, 7, 8, 9, 10, 11)
- Tom Pigott Smith - violin (tracks 1, 2, 3, 4, 5, 7, 8, 9, 10, 11)
- Vicci Wardman - viola (tracks 1, 2, 3, 4, 5, 7, 8, 9, 10, 11)
- Bruce White - viola (tracks 1, 2, 3, 4, 5, 7, 8, 9, 10, 11)
- Rachel Stephanie Bolt - viola (tracks 1, 2, 3, 4, 5, 7, 8, 9, 10, 11)
- Chris Young - electric guitar (tracks 2, 7, 8)
- David Daniels - cello (tracks 2, 3, 4, 5, 7, 8, 9, 10, 11)
- Ian Burdge - cello (tracks 2, 3, 4, 5, 7, 8, 9, 10, 11)
- Chris Worsey - cello (tracks 2, 3, 4, 5, 7, 8, 9, 10, 11)
- Ian Mok - cello (track 1)
- Stacey Watton - double bass (tracks 1, 2, 3, 4, 5, 7, 8, 9, 10, 11)
- Strings arranged by Phildel Ng and James McWilliams (tracks 1, 2, 3, 4, 5, 7, 8, 9, 10, 11)
- Conductor: James McWilliams (tracks 1, 2, 3, 4, 5, 7, 8, 9, 10, 11)
- Choir: Ann De Ranais, Emma Brain Gabbott, Helen Brooks, Helen Parker, Jenny O'Grady, Joanna Forbes, Rachel Weston, Sarah Ryan (tracks 1, 2, 4, 6, 8, 11). Arranged by Phildel.

== Charts ==
Chart (2013)	Peak position
Belgian Albums Chart (Flanders)	185
