= The Glare =

Studio album by David McAlmont and Michael Nyman
- Length: 39:04
- Label: MN Records
- Producer: Michael Nyman

The Glare is a 2009 album pairing Michael Nyman with David McAlmont. McAlmont placed new melodies and lyrics on pre-existing Nyman pieces, including some unreleased music from Practical Magic, newly recorded for the new album. Each of the songs is based upon a different news story from the year. The album received critical acclaim from The Independent and The Guardian in the UK. The basis of each track was not mentioned in the liner notes, and for the album's third anniversary, MN Records offered an autographed copy of the album to the person able to correctly identify the most tracks by 31 December 2012.

== Track listing ==
No.	Title	Length
1.	"Take the Money and Run"	3:13
2.	"Secrets, Accusations and Charges"	3:33
3.	"City of Turin"	3:00
4.	"Friendly Fire"	2:29
5.	"In Rai Don Giovanni"	2:39
6.	"In Laos"	6:29
7.	"Going to America"	3:05
8.	"Fever Sticks and Bones"	3:00
9.	"A Great Day in Kathmandu"	2:41
10.	"Underneath the Hessian Bags"	2:43
11.	"The Glare"	2:42
