= Hideaway (jazz club) =

Jazz club in Streatham, south London

- Location: Streatham, London SW16
- Owner: Frances Strachan
- Type: Jazz club

Construction
- Opened: 2010
- Closed: 2021

Website
- www.hideawaylive.co.uk

Hideaway was a jazz club in Streatham, south London which featured live performances of jazz, funk, swing and soul music as well as stand-up comedy nights. It opened in 2010 and won the Jazz Venue/Promoter of the Year category in the 2011 Parliamentary Jazz Awards.

The venue closed indefinitely in March 2021 as a result of the COVID-19 pandemic, with its owners seeking new premises.
