= The Glass Ghost =

EP by Phildel
- Released: 2013
- Recorded: 2013
- Genre: Pop, alternative pop, neoclassical
- Length: 23:29
- Label: Decca
- Producer: Ross Cullum

Professional ratings
Review scores
Source	Rating
DwfMedia	10/10 stars
StevoMusicMan	9.5/10

The Glass Ghost is the third extended play from British singer-songwriter Phildel. It was released on March 4, 2013 through Decca Records. The EP is a slight shift in sound from her first album, The Disappearance of the Girl, focusing on the incorporation of glassy, crystalline soundscapes and stripping back the use of beats.

== Track listing ==
No.	Title	Producer(s)	Length
1.	"Heaven: An Introduction"	Ross Cullum	1:36
2.	"The Glass Ghost"	Ross Cullum	3:55
3.	"Comfort Me"	Ross Cullum	4:09
4.	"Celestial"	Ross Cullum	3:42
5.	"Porcelain"	Ross Cullum	5:06
6.	"Comfort Me (Delerium remix)"	Ross Cullum	5:01

== Notes ==
“My imagination is the biggest inspiration for my work,” says Phildel. “In my imagination, I guess because of my past, there’s a lot of dark imagery and sinister feelings." Various videos of the album have been released on YouTube, featuring magical make-up looks designed and created by Klaire De Lys.

"Holes In Your Coffin" was originally named 'Coffin Nails' back in 2008.
