= Eagle One: Harrier Attack =

2000 video game

- North American cover art
- Developer: Glass Ghost
- Publisher: Infogrames
- Platform: PlayStation
- Release: EU: January 28, 2000; NA: March 31, 2000
- Genre: Flight simulator
- Modes: Single-player; Multiplayer

Eagle One: Harrier Attack is a video game developed by Glass Ghost and published by Infogrames for the PlayStation in 2000.

== Gameplay ==
Players assume the role of a United States Marine who pilots an AV-8B Harrier jet, as well as five other aircraft including an UH-1 Huey helicopter, an A-10 Thunderbolt II and a F-16 Fighting Falcon. Approximately 80% of the single-player campaign is spent piloting the Harrier. The game's objective is to complete missions such as rescuing downed pilots and attacking terrorist targets. Four modes of play are available, a single-player mode, a co-operative two-player mode, a competitive two-player mode and a training mode to accustom the player to the plane's controls. The game's 25 single-player levels take place throughout the Hawaii island chain, and typically involve low-level flight below an altitude of 100 feet. The co-operative mode features five missions.

== Plot ==
A group of terrorists calling themselves the Army of the New Millennium (ANM) has armed itself with Soviet weapons technology and declared war on the United States of America, with a stated aim of "freeing the world from the grasp of the American war machine." They have attacked the islands of Hawaii with their electromagnetic pulse weapon to knock out all the electrical devices on the islands. Having accomplished this, the group has moved the weapon to a Soviet aircraft carrier and intends to continue their attacks. In response, a United States Marine pilot is dispatched in an AV-8B Harrier in order to liberate all five Hawaiian islands in the chain.

== Reception ==
Reception

Aggregate score
Aggregator	Score
GameRankings	70%

Review scores
Publication	Score
AllGame	3/5
CNET Gamecenter	8/10
Electronic Gaming Monthly	4/10 (Note: Two critics of Electronic Gaming Monthly gave the game each a score of 3.5/10, one gave it 5/10, and another gave it 4/10.)
EP Daily	8/10
GameFan	60% (Note: In GameFan's viewpoint of the game, three critics gave it each a score of 60, 56, and 65.)
GameSpot	4.9/10
IGN	6.5/10
Jeuxvideo.com	16/20
Next Generation	4/5
Official U.S. PlayStation Magazine	3/5

The game received "average" reviews according to the review aggregation website GameRankings. Rick Sanchez of NextGen called it "a well-rounded action title that will keep you glued to your game pad, even if you're not a flight-sim buff." However, GamePro said, "This game balances pseudo-realism with enough action to satisfy arcade-shooter fans, but flight sim vets will be disappointed by Eagle One's lack of depth." (Note: GamePro gave the game three 3.5/5 scores for graphics, sound, and control, and 4/5 for fun factor.)
