= Mandalay (band) =

British trip hop duo

- Origin: London, England
- Genre: Trip hop
- Years active: 1995–2002
- Label: V2 Records
- Past members: Saul Freeman; Nicola Hitchcock

Mandalay were a trip hop duo from England, composed of multi-instrumentalist Saul Freeman (formerly of Thieves) and multi-instrumentalist/singer-songwriter Nicola Hitchcock. They released two albums (plus one America-only compilation disc) and were briefly tagged as "Madonna's favourite band".

== History ==
=== Early (1995–1997) ===
During the early to mid-1990s, Saul Freeman had been the instrument-playing half of the London pop duo Thieves (alongside singer David McAlmont). By the time of their second single, Unworthy, Thieves were gaining a considerable amount of critical attention and had begun recording a debut album for the Virgin Records imprint Hut Recordings. However, Freeman and McAlmont fell out seriously towards the end of the album sessions. Consequently, Thieves split up, with the album eventually being released in 1994 under McAlmont's name (although Freeman was fully credited for his songwriting and instrumental work). While recovering from the Thieves debacle, Freeman immersed himself in club culture and increased his interest in dance music. In 1995, he and his publishers (Chrysalis Music) put a classified advertisement in Melody Maker in order to find a vocalist for a new project.

The advertisement was answered by Nicola Hitchcock, an established musician, singer-songwriter, who had already released a solo album (A Bowl of Chalk) on F-Beat Records a few years previously. Inspired by the developing trip-hop music scene (spearheaded by Massive Attack and Portishead) she began looking for a producer/musician to form a collaborative project. Naming themselves Mandalay, the duo began to write and circulate demo tapes, displaying emergent songs which blended Hitchcock's emotional honesty and melodic sensibilities with Freeman's textured arrangements (which featured elements of trip-hop, dance smoothness and post-punk avant-garde textures).

=== Empathy and "Beautiful" (1997–1999) ===
Mandalay made their debut on a compilation with an early version of their song "This Life". They were courted by various major labels on the strength of their first demos, but opted instead to sign to David Steele's independent label Organic Records in 1996. Their first single release, "Flowers Bloom" gained the Single of the Week award in Melody Maker, immediately strengthening their position and leading to a full recording deal with the recently established V2 Music. While Freeman had produced the early recordings, the V2 deal paired Mandalay with producer Guy Sigsworth (ex-Björk, Seal, Acacia) for the recording of their debut album.

The first Mandalay release on V2 was a re-recorded single version of "This Life", released in 1997. This was followed in 1998 by a re-recorded "Flowers Bloom", which trailed the release of the debut album Empathy (featuring appearances by Sigsworth, former Japan and Rain Tree Crow member Steve Jansen, double bassist Danny Thompson and trumpet player Jon Hassell). The album came to the attention of Madonna, who became a big fan and declared Mandalay to be one of her favorite bands. She chose "This Life" to be featured on the soundtrack for her film, The Next Best Thing, and the track would also appear on the soundtrack to the British film This Year's Love. Many other Mandalay songs have been featured on TV series' including La Femme Nikita, Six Feet Under, CSI: Crime Scene Investigation and CSI: Miami.

The third single from Empathy – "Beautiful" – appeared on a number of chillout albums of the time including Cafe del Mar (Vol 6) and Hed Kandi's Serve Chilled. As a result, Mandalay were invited to headline at the Café del Mar 20th anniversary celebrations in Ibiza in 2000. A sunset remix of "Beautiful" was recorded and mixed by Lenny Ibizarre, the leading chillout DJ/musician on the island. The song went on to be used in a major advertising campaign by Estee Lauder and was chosen for the title track of German film The Polar Bear. In 2003 "Beautiful" was covered by Sarah Brightman on her hit album Harem.

=== Instinct and Solace (2000–2001) ===
Mandalay's second album Instinct was released in 2000 and co-produced with Andy Bradfield (Everything but the Girl, Future Sound of London, Björk) and Yoad Nevo (Jem). MK from The Guardian states, "Instinct draws inspiration from jazz and classical music to create resolutely elegant, affecting pop ... lush and expansive, Instinct's musical world is perfectly realised."

The first single from this album, "Deep Love", was remixed by Nitin Sawhney - Mandalay went on to support Sawhney on his UK/London dates. Performances at Ibiza's chillout festivals followed including "Las Dallias" and "Dreamdaze" culminating in a headline performance at The Big Chill festival in the UK.

In order to consolidate their position in the United States (where they were known mostly by hearsay and association), Mandalay released an America-only compilation album called Solace in 2001 which is also considered to be their debut album for the US. This comprised a mix of tracks from Empathy and Instinct (both previously unavailable in the US) and was packaged with an 11 track remix album with contributions from Wagon Christ, Alex Reece and Charlie May. Solace sold more than 44,000 copies in the US, and the band made a brief tour to promote it.

=== Split and current projects (2002–present) ===
Although the band was on the brink of an American breakthrough, Mandalay ended in 2002 when Hitchcock and Freeman parted ways shortly after the release of Solace, due to irreconcilable personal and professional differences.

Hitchcock went on to release her album Passive Aggressive in 2005 which includes collaborations with artists Ryuichi Sakamoto, Hector Zazou and Chris Brann. She is currently working on a new solo album.

Freeman went on to compose music for a number of short films, the full-length art film Far from China by director C.S. Leigh and a number of UK and US TV programmes including the award-winning documentary series Testing God.

In 2013, Freeman started releasing music again after a long period of creative silence.

== Discography ==
=== Studio albums ===
- Empathy (1998)
- Instinct (2000)

=== Compilation albums ===
- Solace (2001)

=== Singles ===
- "Flowers Bloom" (1996)
- "This Life" (1997)
- "Beautiful" (1998)
- "Deep Love" (2000)
- "Not Seventeen" (2000)

== In popular culture ==
- CSI: Crime Scene Investigation used two of their songs: "I Don't Want the Night to End" was played in the episode "You've Got Male" (Season 2, Episode 12) and "Like Her" was used in the episode "Play with Fire" (Season 3, Episode 22).
- Strong Medicine used their song "Insensible" in the episode "Side Effects" (Season 1, Episode 14).
- The film Iron Jawed Angels features the song "Beautiful".
