= Blue Stone (music group) =

- Origin: Fort Lauderdale, Florida, United States
- Genres: Electronica; ambient; electropop
- Years active: 2006–present
- Labels: Neurodisc Records
- Members: Robert Smith; Bill Walters; Sheyenne Rivers; Samantha Sandlin; Maura Hurley; Sara Bloomfield; Sarah Day Evans; Veronika Gunter
- Website: Blue Stone MySpace

Blue Stone is an American electropop musical project formed by producer/programmer Robert Smith and producer/multi-instrumentalist Bill Walters, and featuring various female guest vocalists. The group has released three studio albums and one remix album, all on Neurodisc Records, since 2006.

== Musical style and influences ==
Blue Stone's style and genre have been described as "Ethereal Pop," "Ambient Pop," "Dream Pop," and "New Age" by critics. Their music integrates layered hardware and software synthesizers with live piano, vocals, and percussion.

Robert Smith and Bill Walters are the group's core members, who write the majority and produce all of Blue Stone's output. They collaborate with various female guest vocalists, some of whom are credited as co-writers of songs. Prior to forming Blue Stone, Smith released music in the New Age genre as Bella Sonus. He and Walters have experience performing together as bandmates in Rock and Blues projects in prior decades. The two have cited a variety of musical artists, including Pink Floyd, Jan Hammer, William Orbit, Delerium, BT, and Afro Celt Sound System, as having been influential in developing their sound.

== History ==
Blue Stone's first studio album, Breathe, was released in 2006 and received mixed reviews. Breathe features one guest vocalist, Darcy, on numerous songs, which are a combination of free-form composition and traditional verse/chorus songwriting. The album performed well on the iTunes Store's Electronic Album Chart Top 100. Worlds Apart was released in 2007 to uniformly positive reviews, and included three guest vocalists (Rivers, Sandlin, and Hurley), each performing on multiple songs. This album represented a shift toward a majority of conventionally written (verse/chorus-type) songs that continued in the 2009 release Messages, which was also well received by critics.

== Breathe ==
Breathe

Studio album by Blue Stone
- Released: January 31, 2006
- Genre: Electronic, pop
- Label: Neurodisc
- Producer: Robert Smith and Bill Walters

Track	Song title	Duration
1	"Confession"	06:12
2	"Breathe"	04:10
3	"Break of Dawn"	04:27
4	"Falling"	04:21
5	"The River"	03:35
6	"I Am"	05:00
7	"Forgiven"	03:52
8	"Only One"	05:24
9	"Holy Ground"	05:19
10	"Searching"	04:37
11	"Contact"	03:54
12	"Dusk"	04:32
13	"Traveler"	03:36
14	"Lost"	05:31
15	"New Beginning"	06:58

== Worlds Apart ==
Worlds Apart

Studio album by Blue Stone
- Released: January 30, 2007
- Genre: Electronic, pop
- Label: Neurodisc
- Producer: Robert Smith and Bill Walters

Track	Song title	Duration
1	"Set Adrift"	05:40
2	"Waters Flow"	05:28
3	"Lost Sun"	02:26
4	"Dreamcatcher"	05:46
5	"Voleti"	04:39
6	"Worlds Apart (Searching for You)"	04:55
7	"Envy"	05:03
8	"Take Flight"	04:55
9	"Far Away"	04:54
10	"Labyrinth of Dreams"	04:54
11	"Tears"	04:12
12	"Event Horizon"	04:39
13	"Remember This"	05:11
14	"On the Wind"	04:09
15	"Circles"	05:39
16	"Flood"	02:08

== Worlds Apart Remixed ==
Worlds Apart Remixed

Studio album by Blue Stone
- Released: 2008
- Genre: Electronic, pop
- Label: Spectacle Entertainment
- Producer: Robert Smith and Bill Walters

Track	Song title	Duration
1	"Dreamcatcher (Leaving the Ledge Mix)"	06:39
2	"Worlds Apart (Dark Mix)"	07:30
3	"Event Horizon (Smoldering Mix)"	06:15
4	"Waters Flow (Heavy Mix)"	05:34
5	"Adrift (Civilized Mix)"	06:47
6	"Worlds Apart (Burning Mix)"	04:46
7	"Faraway (Runaway Mix)"	05:14
8	"Tears (Wish for Light Mix)"	07:07
9	"Worlds Apart (Hear the Memory Mix)"	06:37
10	"Circles (Round and Round Mix)"	05:59
11	"Tears Are Falling" (New Track)	05:48
12	"Event Horizon (Live Acoustic)"	04:52

== Messages ==
Messages

Studio album by Blue Stone
- Released: July 28, 2009
- Genre: Electronic, pop
- Label: Neurodisc
- Producer: Robert Smith and Bill Walters

Track	Song title	Duration
1	"Midnight Tides" (feat. Sara Bloomfield)	05:48
2	"Open Your Eyes" (feat. Sheyenne Rivers)	05:37
3	"Deja Vu" (feat. Sara Bloomfield)	04:21
4	"Hang On" (feat. Bridin Brennan, Karen Hamill)	04:20
5	"Wait for the Sun" (feat. Sheyenne Rivers, Veronika Gunter)	04:22
6	"Open Sky" (feat. Samantha Sandlin)	05:38
7	"Lotus Bloom" (feat. Sara Bloomfield)	04:55
8	"Come Alive" (feat. Sheyenne Rivers)	04:18
9	"Moving Forward" (feat. Samantha Sandlin)	05:07
10	"Ancient Echoes" (feat. Sara Bloomfield)	05:10
11	"Set Me in the Sun" (feat. Sara Day Evans)	04:20
12	"Bridges" (feat. Sara Bloomfield)	05:38
13	"The Silence" (feat. Samantha Sandlin)	04:20
14	"Hypnotized" (feat. Sara Bloomfield)	06:27
15	"Messages" (feat. Sara Bloomfield)	03:05

== Pandora's Box ==
Pandora's box

Studio album by Blue Stone
- Released: 2011
- Genre: Electronic, pop
- Label: Neurodisc
- Producer: Robert Smith and Bill Walters

Track	Song title	Duration
1	"Innocence"	04:57
2	"Mischief"	05:44
3	"Seduction"	05:43
4	"Epimetheus"	05:47
5	"Curiosity"	05:10
6	"Darkened Rooms"	06:17
7	"Who Are You"	05:23
8	"The Journey"	04:45
9	"Stolen Light"	04:48
10	"Shattered"	04:38
11	"Hope"	03:23

== Phoenix ==
Phoenix

EP by Blue Stone
- Released: 2012
- Genre: Electronic, pop
- Label: Neurodisc
- Producer: Robert Smith and Bill Walters

Track	Song title	Duration
1	"Dream" (feat. Sara Bloomfield)	4:01
2	"Uncover Me" (feat. Samantha Duncan)	5:19
3	"Caged" (feat. Cody Gesumaria)	5:10
4	"Fairy Star" (feat. Sara Bloomfield)	5:48
5	"Speed" (feat. Samantha Duncan)	4:15

== Compendium ==
Compendium

Studio album by Blue Stone
- Released: 11 November 2014
- Genre: Electronic, pop
- Label: Neurodisc
- Producer: Robert Smith and Bill Walters

Track	Song title	Duration
1	"Déjà Vu" (feat. Sara Bloomfield)	4:21
2	"Dreamcatcher" (feat. Sheyenne Rivers)	5:57
3	"Lotus Bloom" (feat. Sara Bloomfield)	4:55
4	"Uncover Me"	5:19
5	"Breathe"	4:07
6	"Open Sky" (feat. Samantha Sandlin Duncan)	5:39
7	"Epimetheus"	5:42
8	"Worlds Apart" (feat. Sheyenne Rivers)	5:02
9	"Holy Ground"	5:25
10	"Set Me in the Sun" (feat. Sarah Day Evans)	4:20
11	"Labyrinth of Dreams" (feat. Maura Hurley)	4:55
12	"Warrior Heart" (feat. Sara Bloomfield)	5:08
13	"One Star" (feat. Stephanie Erato) (New)	5:56
14	"No Tears" (feat. Samantha Sandlin Duncan) (New)	5:02
15	"Serenity" (feat. Christine Bowman) (New)	5:02
16	"Te Deum" (written by Händel) (feat. Erin Nygard)	5:00

== Prophecy ==
Prohecy

Studio album by Blue Stone
- Released: March 19, 2020
- Genre: Alternative/indie, Children's Music, Pop, Rock, Folk, Country
- Label: INgrooves Fontana - Neurodisc Records

Track	Song title	Duration
1	"Raindrops"	04:28
2	"The Village"	05:45
3	"Karmic Moon"	03:47
4	"Acidity"	04:14
5	"Salem"	03:56
6	"The Road"	04:38
7	"The Spell"	03:37
8	"Run Deep"	04:17
9	"The Monk"	04:50
10	"Nature's Light"	04:17
11	"Sweet Dreams"	04:40
12	"Seeds of Change"	04:33
13	"Who Are You"	04:46
14	"Human Folly"	05:28
