= Balligomingo =

American music project

Balligomingo is an electronic music project by Garrett Schwartz and Vic Levak. Their music has been compared to that of Delerium, Massive Attack, Conjure One, Mythos, Nitin Sawhney and Enigma. Vocalist Jody Quine is featured on the 2009 album Under an Endless Sky. They are named after a road in Gulph Mills, Pennsylvania, which was named after the Lenni-Lenape word for the area. Balligomingo's music is also featured in the 2003 film Hollywood Vampyr.

== Discography ==
=== Albums ===
- Beneath the Surface (2002)
- Under an Endless Sky (2009)
- Remix, Vol. 1 (2011)
