= Sleepthief =

American electronic music recording project

Sleepthief is an American electronic music recording project formed by producer and composer Justin Elswick. Elswick began writing music for his first album ten years prior to its release. The album was mixed, mastered, co-produced, and co-arranged by Israel Curtis. Sleepthief's first album, The Dawnseeker, was released in 2006.

Sleepthief is most often compared to musical groups such as Delerium (in its output from the mid-1990s onward) and Balligomingo, which produce emotive, melodic, synthesized music with what is often described as new-age-influenced ethnic characteristics from other cultures. Also similar to these groups is Sleepthief's use of pop music-based song structures with performances by female singers. Eleven vocalists contribute to The Dawnseeker, many of whom are established recording artists, and some having worked with the aforementioned groups previously. All of Sleepthief's cover album art was drawn by his long-time collaborator Brian Son.

== Biography ==
=== Early life and education ===
Born in Southern California, Elswick served as a missionary for the Church of Jesus Christ of Latter-day Saints in Texas and received a B.A. degree in History from Brigham Young University. Throughout this period, he became a self-taught musician. Justin also studied in Ireland, graduating with a master's degree in philosophy at Trinity College, Dublin followed by a Juris Doctor degree at J. Reuben Clark Law School. He is also a practicing attorney in Provo, Utah.

In addition, Elswick wrote for Musical Discoveries, a music website dedicated to female vocalists, as an associate editor.

=== Music career ===
Elswick began working on songs with Israel Curtis around 2003. Russell Elliot, editor-in-chief of Musical Discoveries, put Elswick in contact with singer Jody Quine in December 2003. Quine became the first singer to join with the project, recording three songs and being filmed for a music video by 2005. Vic Levak, who worked with Balligomingo along with Quine, also worked with the group.

Sleepthief has released three albums: The Dawnseeker (2006), Labyrinthine Heart (2009), and Mortal Longing (2018) as well as several singles from all three albums.

=== Other projects ===
After releasing Labyrinthine Heart, Elswick released two new tracks included in the compilation Beauty 2 - Music That Touches the Soul, which was released on October 25, 2010. The first track, "Another Day", was sung by Kyoko Baertsoen and is a cover of the original song by Roy Harper. The second track, "Empyrean", was sung by Suzanne Perry and was performed with the glossolalia technique.

Sleepthief's website site was launched on June 11. He also worked on a remix and a song for Nicola Hitchcock's solo album. Another version of "Send Me an Angel" was released in December 2012, featuring strings by Caroline Lavelle. Both of Sleepthief's albums have been available on iTunes since April 12, 2013.

Sleepthief also has a side project with Caroline Lavelle and Israel Curtis called Spythriller, and the first video and related single, a cover of Nightwish's "Nemo", was released on November 15, 2011 with remixes of the song by Jamie Myerson and Treatise. Two more tracks for the album, "Cold War Kisses" and "Aftermath", can be found on the Spythriller official website and official YouTube channel. The next single was "Asleep in Metropolis", and featured a video shot by Hugh Marsh.

Curtis also worked with Roberta Carter-Harrison on her solo album and with Carla Werner on her own solo dance album.

Sleepthief also releases spiritual and Christmas songs on his SoundCloud page which appear on the Christmas album Echoes of Winter, released on SoundCloud on November 30, 2016.

== Notes and references ==
- https://www.theguardian.com/music/2008/nov/07/london-jazz-festival
- https://web.archive.org/web/20160424074514/http://righttempoagency.com/wp-content/uploads/2015/01/Liam-Noble-Biography.pdf
- https://www.proquest.com/docview/1437556661/B5C8AFEF76E04323PQ/1
- https://www.proquest.com/docview/324348520/D4BAF030053C4348PQ/3
- https://www.proquest.com/docview/750133146/D4BAF030053C4348PQ/5
- https://www.proquest.com/docview/244297778/D4BAF030053C4348PQ/4
- https://www.proquest.com/docview/1561314284/D4BAF030053C4348PQ/2
- https://www.jazzwise.com/features/article/ingrid-laubrock-stolen-moments
- https://web.archive.org/web/20201001085502/https://www.theartsdesk.com/node/76486/view
- https://web.archive.org/web/20140925230648/http://www.leedsjazz.org.uk/res/pjn04/pjn0446.pdf
