= Thieves (band) =

British pop band

- Origin: London, England
- Genres: Pop, soul, indie
- Years active: 1992–1994
- Past members: David McAlmont; Saul Freeman

Thieves were a British pop duo active during the early 1990s. They were most notable for being the band of which both members – singer David McAlmont and multi-instrumentalist/producer Saul Freeman (who would later form trip-hop band Mandalay) – based their subsequent musical careers.

Critically feted by the British weekly music press during their lifetime, the duo also won two Single of the Week awards in Melody Maker but split shortly before the scheduled release of their debut album (which was later released as McAlmont's debut solo album).

== History ==
=== Formation ===
David McAlmont (born David Irving McAlmont, 2 May 1967, Croydon, England), originally of Guyanese/Nigerian heritage, was raised as a Christian and spent his early years in Croydon, Cardiff and Guyana. He began his musical life in Guyana singing in church choirs. His Christian upbringing would clash with his growing realisation of his homosexuality in his teenage years. By the age of 20, his experiences had ultimately led him to decide to be true to his sexual nature.

While exploring the London independent pop scene of the early 1990s, McAlmont encountered Saul Freeman, an accomplished multi-instrumentalist and programmer with whom he formed Thieves (naming the band after a work by Jean Cocteau). Freeman was influenced predominantly by post-punk pop and rock bands (such as Scritti Politti, Associates and Cocteau Twins), and Thieves blended this with McAlmont's own gospel and soul influences to create a lush and highly textural pop music drawing equally on "black" music and "white" avant-garde indie rock. Freeman and McAlmont opted to remain as a duo, using detailed backing tapes and programmed percussion tracks (live, Freeman concentrated on playing strongly-processed electric guitar).

=== Early live work ===
Thieves began playing concerts in small London venues, where they immediately began to attract attention. The group's format of black singer/white instrumentalist was not in itself unusual, but as a black frontman who was also a flamboyantly "out" homosexual (with presentation to match), McAlmont was seen as an exotic rarity, as was his striking three-octave voice. McAlmont's outrageous dress sense (and taste for cross-dressing) also became notorious, with one review describing him as "a strawberry daiquiri in a dress".

The outspoken and photogenic McAlmont became a minor celebrity on the London indie scene, while the quieter Freeman took more of a smaller role in interviews and concentrated more heavily on Thieves' multi-layered and complex musical arrangements with producer/engineer Michael J. Ade.

=== Singles ("Through the Door" and "Unworthy") ===
In 1992, Thieves signed to the small label Nursery Records, on which they released their debut single. "Through the Door" (on which Freeman's Cocteau Twins influences dominated) won the Single of the Week award in Melody Maker and gained sufficient interest for Thieves to move up to Nursery's parent company, Hut Recordings (itself a subsidiary of Virgin Records).

Later in the year, the first Hut release – Thieves' second single "Unworthy" – showed the duo moving in a much more pop-orientated direction. With more obvious soul influences (having some melodic and atmospheric similarities to Marvin Gaye's "What's Going On"), it also sampled dialogue from a variety of additional pop culture touchstones including Torch Song Trilogy and Thirtysomething. Like its predecessor, it became a Melody Maker Single of the Week.

The band's next step was to play as support act to Morrissey on the latter's British tour, helping them to build a new audience.

== Album recording and split ==
With strong expectations of a commercial breakthrough, Thieves were booked into a studio in Soho, London, to complete material for their debut album. Pulp producer Ed Buller oversaw the sessions, with further strong input from musician/producer Paul Sampson.

During the sessions, problems began to develop. McAlmont would subsequently complain that Buller's approach to Thieves' music had ended up sidelining him, and that he had increasingly been provided with musical backdrops to sing over with which he had little sympathy or feeling. (This experience would help McAlmont find common ground with a subsequent collaborator, Bernard Butler, who claimed similar frustrations with Buller's production of the second Suede album Dog Man Star.)

Shortly before the scheduled release of the album, the working relationship between Freeman and McAlmont broke down completely. The album was temporarily shelved. The duo were unable to reach agreement on the issues dividing them and Thieves consequently split up.

=== Release of remaining material under "McAlmont" name ===
Once legal matters with Freeman had been cleared up, Hut Recordings were left with the completed Thieves recordings. As McAlmont was comparatively celebrated in indie circles (while Freeman had had less of a presence in publicity and interviews), it was decided that these recordings would be released under the project name of "McAlmont" to further McAlmont's career. A third single, "Either", was the first formal McAlmont release.

The Thieves album was released as the eponymous McAlmont album in 1994, with Saul Freeman's instrumental and songwriting contributions fully credited but with all artwork featuring McAlmont alone. The album contained two of the three singles – "Either" and "Unworthy" – plus the "Unworthy" B-side "They Hide" and a cover of Joni Mitchell's "Conversation", but did not contain any of the material from the Through the Door EP (some of the Through the Door material was contained in a limited-edition second CD enclosed with early versions of the album).

McAlmont was well-received by those critics who reviewed it, but the delay (and the loss of the Thieves brand name) had already stalled its momentum. It did not sell well or make a public breakthrough.

== Post-Thieves ==
Freeman teamed up with singer-composer and multi-instrumentalist Nicola Hitchcock in 1995 to form the trip hop duo Mandalay. This project would go on to greater success than Thieves, releasing two albums – Empathy and Instinct – plus the US-only compilation Solace before splitting in 2002.

McAlmont continued his career by linking up with former Suede guitarist Bernard Butler for the intermittent McAlmont and Butler project (which scored a top 10 single in 1995 with their debut release "Yes" and has gone on to release two albums, The Sound of McAlmont and Butler and Bring It Back, plus several more singles). He would continue his solo career with a more conventional soul album (A Little Communication, 1998) and the unreleased dance-orientated album Be (2000). Most recently, he has been recording albums containing new versions of song standards (the first of which, Set One: You Go to My Head was released in 2005) and working with Michael Nyman. Over the years, he has toned down the flamboyance (and, to a degree, the outright expression of his sexuality) which he displayed with Thieves in favour of a more neutral image, and has concentrated more on his abilities as a singer.

Despite their past differences, Freeman and McAlmont were reconciled briefly in 2000 (at the time of the second Mandalay album Instinct) . The duo worked for fun on a number of tracks and one of these – "Santa Getrudis" – was signed to the Echo Label under the name Playas. This jazz-tinged house-influenced track recounted the story of McAlmont hanging out with Mandalay in a villa in Ibiza during the summer of 2001 whilst they were on the island appearing at festivals and staying up late.

== Discography ==
(as Thieves)

- Through the Door (EP) (1992)
- Unworthy (EP) (1992)

(as McAlmont, and usually counted as part of David McAlmont's discography)

- Either (EP) (1993)
- McAlmont (album) (1994)
