= Nicola Hitchcock =

British singer and songwriter

- Born: Nicola Corinne Hitchcock; London, England
- Genres: Electronic; trip hop; downtempo
- Occupations: Singer-songwriter; producer
- Instruments: Vocals; guitar; keyboards; accordion; hand drum; programming
- Years active: 1984–present
- Labels: F-Beat/Demon; V2; Tempted
- Website: nicolahitchcock.com

Nicola Corinne Hitchcock is a British singer and songwriter. She is best known for having been one half of the trip hop duo Mandalay (along with Saul Freeman). Following the demise of Mandalay, she has worked with various dance music and avant-garde musicians including Chris Brann and Ryuichi Sakamoto but has more recently returned to her solo career.

== History ==
=== Childhood and musical roots ===
Nicola Hitchcock's father was a musician, actor, script writer, and TV producer/director. He left the family home when Nicola was three after her parents divorced. She has credited her father for her initial interest in music and for teaching her how to create her first songs. She began seriously writing songs from the age of nine, when she received her first acoustic guitar. Early influences included the Beatles and Carole King.

"My Dad was a music addict, always had commercial radio playing in the car and in the house… he'd sit beside me at the piano making up duets, him at the bass end me at the top … I remember our living room being scattered with test pressings, white labels... putting them on and jumping around to them as a kid"

— Nicola Hitchcock on her father's influence on her early interest in music

From the age of 15, she began gaining stage experience in local covers bands, learning to play accordion, keyboards and percussion in addition to her vocal and guitar skills. While training as a teacher Hitchcock took the opportunity to learn from degree music students, gaining lessons on classical composition and opera singing as well as keyboard skills.

=== Early work in bands ===
During her twenties, Hitchcock gained work as a backing vocalist and multi-instrumentalist on the London live music circuit. She was for a time a member of Eternal Triangle, a London-based pop/new wave band who were signed to Beggars Banquet. In 1984, she contributed vocals and keyboards to their sole album, Touch and Let Go, as well as its two associated singles.

In 1992, she wrote and recorded several 4-track demos performed solo as a voice-and-guitar act in various acoustic and folk clubs prior to being signed up by F-Beat/Demon Records.

=== A Bowl of Chalk (first solo album, 1993) ===
F-Beat Records signed her up for her first solo album, 1993's A Bowl of Chalk. A Bowl of Chalk was a low-key, stripped-down, acoustic vibe. Hitchcock added folk instrumentation such as whistle, accordion and hand drum, and several tracks featured the celebrated British jazz/folk musician Danny Thompson (ex-Pentangle/John Martyn) on double bass (other performers included Prefab Sprout drummer Neil Conti). In a Folk Roots magazine review, Colin Irwin praised Hitchcock's songwriting, commenting "there's something indefinably magical in her delivery and in the very human troubled personal conflicts in her exceptional lyrics... a remarkable debut." The album yielded two singles, "Pick Up Your Coat" and "My Mistake". The former featured an acoustic cover of Squeeze's "Is That Love", performed as a duet with Chris Difford.

A Bowl of Chalk boosted Hitchcock's reputation on London's folk and acoustic circuit and led to full band performances at the Guildford Folk Festival, the Cambridge Folk Festival and the Phoenix Festival. Unfortunately, F-Beat Records folded shortly afterwards and the album went out of print.

=== Mandalay ===
Recently inspired by the developing trip-hop music scene (as spearheaded by Massive Attack and Portishead), Hitchcock now began to seek out other musical opportunities. Replying to another advert in Melody Maker put her in touch with Chrysalis Music and with Saul Freeman. Freeman was a multi-instrumentalist/producer who had initially been the other half of the acclaimed pop duo Thieves, before a falling-out with his partner (singer David McAlmont) had left Freeman without a band and with his work released as McAlmont's debut album.

Hitchcock and Freeman formed another pop duo, Mandalay, which blended Hitchcock's talent as a musician and singer-songwriter with Freeman's textured arrangements and his mixture of trip-hop dance smoothness and post-punk avant-garde textures. Mandalay were courted by various major labels on completion of their first demos, but opted instead to sign to David Steele's independent label Organic Records. Mandalay's first single release, "Flowers Bloom" gained the Single of the Week award in Melody Maker, immediately strengthening their position. They subsequently signed to V2 Records, for whom they would release two albums, Empathy and Instinct.

Mandalay lasted for seven years, during which they received a good deal of critical acclaim and the tag of "Madonna's favourite band." The project ended in 2002 due to musical and personal differences.

=== Post-Mandalay ===
==== 2000s ====
Shortly before Mandalay's demise in 2002, Hitchcock's songwriting and vocal talents were sought out by Tiësto who chose her for the song "In My Memory" for his first album of the same title. With a deft remix from him, it became the lead single for the album, the success of which led to a live performance by Hitchcock at the Dutch Music Awards in 2002.

Hitchcock's career was interrupted by a car accident, a relocation to Devon and a period spent recuperating from the Epstein-Barr virus. However, during this time she continued to be sought out by artists, musicians, and DJs contacting her via the internet and email with requests for possible collaborations. She began working on tracks from avant-garde composers Hector Zazou, Ryuichi Sakamoto, Lenny Ibizarre and the underground artist and DJ Chris Brann (Wamdue Project, P'taah, etc.).

In 2005, Hitchcock released her second solo album Passive Aggressive, on her own label Tempted Records. The album compiled many of her recent collaborations – excluding "In My Memory" but including the work with Sakamoto, Brann, Ibizarre and Zazou (as well as newer work with Sounds from the Ground, the string trio Echo and frequent Thieves/Mandalay collaborator Michael J. Ade).

In 2006, Hitchcock was approached by Justin Elswick of the electronic dance project Sleepthief, which led to her co-writing and performing the song "You Did a Good Thing" on Sleepthief's debut album The Dawnseeker.

==== 2010s–present ====
In 2012, Hitchcock released a self-produced EP consisting of three new tracks "A Coeurs Vaillants", "Magic Heart" and the title track, "Quarterbright". She is currently working on her next solo release and also on new collaborations.

In 2016, Hitchcock was a guest vocalist on Steve Jansen's Tender Extinction album on the track "Faced with Nothing".

In 2020, Hitchcock released a new single, "Song for Rachel".

== Discography ==
- 1984: Touch and Let Go (with Eternal Triangle)
- 1993: A Bowl of Chalk
- 1998: Empathy (with Mandalay)
- 2000: Instinct (with Mandalay)
- 2005: Passive Aggressive
