= David McAlmont =

British singer and historian (born 1967)

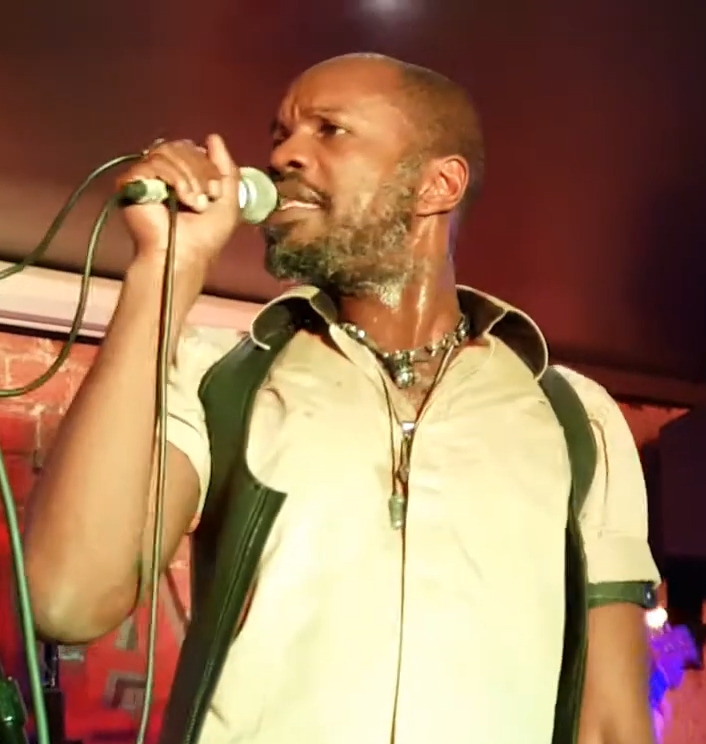
- McAlmont performing in 2017

Background information
- Born: David Irving McAlmont; 2 May 1967 (age 59); Croydon, London, England
- Occupations: Singer; essayist; art historian

David Irving McAlmont (born 2 May 1967) is an English vocalist, essayist and art historian. He came to prominence in the 1990s as a singer, particularly through his collaboration with Bernard Butler. In the 2010s he returned to academia, working with the University of Leicester and the Architectural Association School of Architecture.

== Early life ==
McAlmont was born on 2 May 1967 to a Guyanese mother and Nigerian father. His mother was a nurse and his father a law student. He, his mother and sister moved to Gorleston on Sea, Norfolk, where his education continued at Peterhouse Primary School.

In 1978 the family departed the United Kingdom for Guyana. The family resided with his grandparents in Lovely Lass Village Berbice, and with his aunt in Wismar, Demerara, moving onto the East Bank of the Demerara River at Grove and Craig. In 1978, McAlmont scored well on his Secondary School Entrance Examination and attended the Queen's College, Georgetown, Guyana.

His education continued from 1989 at Middlesex Polytechnic where he read Performing Arts on the BAPA programme before leaving to sign a publishing contract with Chrysalis Music in 1992, followed by a record deal with Virgin's Hut Records two years later.

== Music career ==
McAlmont first came to attention in the London band Thieves, who attracted early attention with the 1992 single "Through The Door". Despite the release of a third single, "Either", Thieves split acrimoniously in 1994 shortly before the release of their first album. Following legal wrangling, the album was eventually released as the debut David McAlmont album (under the project name and album title of McAlmont). Despite some positive press attention, much of it still focusing on McAlmont's startling voice (Melody Maker journalist Taylor Parkes commented "One day he will open his mouth and a cathedral will fall out"), but the album was not a commercial success.

McAlmont continued his solo career – including opening for Morrissey at Theatre Royal Drury Lane – until he was approached by ex-Suede guitarist Bernard Butler. The collaboration produced The Sound of McAlmont and Butler, an album of songs including "Yes" (1995), which reached number 8 in the UK Singles Chart.

McAlmont and Butler performed "Yes" on the BBC TV show Later with Jools Holland in June 1995. Another single, "You Do", was released later that year, and peaked at number 17. Shortly after McAlmont and Butler went their separate ways.

The producer David Arnold then worked with McAlmont on a version of "Diamonds Are Forever". They went on to work together in 1998 on McAlmont's second album A Little Communication.

In the years that followed McAlmont worked occasionally with Ultramarine and Craig Armstrong, and prepared his third album Be. Although hailed by The Guardian as "Britain's first Zen Pop album" it was shelved by his record label, Hut Records, leading to McAlmont's departure from the label.

In 2001, Butler reunited with McAlmont, and they were signed by EMI. The resulting album Bring It Back (2002) spawned two single releases, "Falling" and "Bring it Back". This time they were more conventional in their approach to the music industry, and took part in interviews, and completed a series of public performances throughout 2002.

== Recent work ==
In 2005, McAlmont released "Set One You Go to My Head" on Ether Records. The label folded at the end of that year. McAlmont performed material from that album at various jazz venues including Ronnie Scott's.

In 2006, McAlmont joined the faculty at the Architectural Association Interprofessional Studio in London. He is currently Studio Master with the AAIS and Diploma Unit Master at the Eureka Unit.

In 2007, McAlmont provided backing vocals for Gabrielle's album Always, with Paul Weller on a song called "Why" which sampled Weller's "Wild Wood". Butler approached McAlmont to provide backing vocals for Duffy on Rockferry and for Sharleen Spiteri. A Little Communication, his follow-up to the first McAlmont And Butler album was digitally reissued on 23 June 2008 on iTunes. A performance of the complete album was hosted by the London Jazz Festival on 16 November at The Jazz Cafe in Camden.

In 2009, McAlmont released The Glare, a collaboration with leading classical composer Michael Nyman. Each of the songs is based on a different news story from the year. The album received critical acclaim from several newspapers.

In February 2011, SFE records released a live McAlmont set (featuring Bernard Butler on three tracks) as a CD and DVD package entitled Live From Leicester Square.

In October 2011, McAlmont and Guy Davies announced their collaboration and the formation of Fingersnap. The first release comes in the form of the Smokehouse EP. McAlmont and Davies originally met back in 1997 and they previously worked together on the albums A Little Communication and Set One: You Go to My Head. The release of the Smokehouse EP was supported by live performances throughout the UK in November and December 2011.

In 2012, McAlmont decided to return to higher education and began a second degree in the History of Western Art & Architecture at the University of London's Birkbeck College, which he completed in 2016.

In 2013 McAlmont fronted a four-piece band at the first of an annual series of live concerts titled Wall to Wall: Bowie, duetting with singer Sam Obernik at London's Hideaway nightspot. Bowie classics were rearranged with a jazz twist by musical director Janette Mason who released an EP of them in 2020.

In July 2014, McAlmont again appeared with David Arnold at Arnold's debut live orchestral concert held at London's Royal Festival Hall. McAlmont appeared as a surprise guest vocalist on "Surrender" and "Play Dead"; Arnold described him as "my secret weapon".

In 2014 and 2015, McAlmont teamed again with Bernard Butler to perform live at various venues, including the Lauren Laverne radio show. In 2016, McAlmont sang on the album Call Me Lucky by Alex Webb & The Copasetics; he has subsequently collaborated with Webb on a words-and-music show based on the music of Billie Holiday. In 2019 McAlmont again collaborated with Webb to publish a new album titled The Last Bohemians.

In 2017, McAlmont collaborated with the University of Leicester Research Centre for Museums and Galleries on the Pink Award winning National Trust Prejudice and Pride project, creating Girl Boy Child, an exploration of LGBT+ lives lived in National Trust properties.

In 2018, he created Portrait of a Black Queer Briton, performed at the National Portrait Gallery, London.

2023 saw McAlmont in collaboration with RCMG once again with Historic Royal Palaces, leading to Permissible Beauty, an installation at Hampton Court Palace and a short film, "Highly commended" by the Museums and Heritage Trust.

2023 also saw an album collaboration with Hifi Sean entitled Happy Ending. This was followed by albums Daylight in 2024 and Twilight in 2025.

In 2024, McAlmont was awarded an Honorary Doctorate of Letters by the University of Leicester. He also curated Royal Society of Sculptors Summer Show with the theme, Reality Check. In honour of the James Baldwin birth centennial, he joined Russell Tovey and Omari Douglas at the Charleston Literary Festival for the event, Baldwin versus Buckley.

In 2025, McAlmont collaborated with the National Gallery in London on All About David to commemorate 200 years since passing of the 18th century French artist Jacques Louis David (1748 - 1825).

McAlmont is gay.

== Discography ==
=== Albums ===
Year	Album	UK Albums Chart
1994	McAlmont	—
1995	The Sound of McAlmont and Butler; McAlmont and Butler	33
1998	A Little Communication	—
2000	Be; Unreleased	—
2002	Bring It Back; McAlmont and Butler	18
2005	Set One: You Go to My Head	—
2009	The Glare; David McAlmont and Michael Nyman	—
2011	Live From Leicester Square	—
2023	Happy Ending; Hifi Sean and David McAlmont	—
2024	Daylight; Hifi Sean and David McAlmont	—
2025	Twilight; Hifi Sean and David McAlmont	—

=== Singles ===
Year	Single	UK Singles Chart	Album
1993	"Unworthy"; Thieves	—	Unworthy
1994	"Either"	91	Unworthy
1994	"Hymn"; Ultramarine featuring David McAlmont	65	Non-album single
1995	"Yes"; McAlmont and Butler	8	The Sound of McAlmont and Butler
1995	"Saturday"	—	Non-album single
1995	"You Do"; McAlmont and Butler	17	The Sound of McAlmont and Butler
1997	"Look at Yourself"	40	Non-album single
1997	"Diamonds Are Forever"; David McAlmont/David Arnold	39	Shaken and Stirred: The David; Arnold James Bond Project
1998	"Honey"	—	A Little Communication
1999	"A Little Communication"	—	A Little Communication
1999	"Lose My Faith"	—	A Little Communication
2000	"Easy"	—	Be
2000	"Working"	—	Be
2002	"Falling"; McAlmont and Butler	23	Bring It Back
2002	"Bring It Back"; McAlmont and Butler	36	Bring It Back
2006	"Speed"; McAlmont and Butler	—	Non-album single
2010	"The Coldest Place on Earth"; David McAlmont and Michael Nyman	—	Non-album single
2013	"Time Stands Still"; Julian Butler feat. David McAlmont	—	Non-album single

== See also ==
- Versus Cancer
