= Cadden =

Cadden is a surname. Notable people with the surname include:

- Chris Cadden (born 1996), Scottish footballer
- Cory Cadden (1969–2017), Canadian ice hockey player
- Joan Cadden (politician) (born 1941), American beautician and politician
- Joan Cadden (historian) (born 1944), American historian
- Joe Cadden (1920–1981), Scottish footballer
- Mamie Cadden (1891–1959), Irish midwife, backstreet abortionist, and convicted murderer
- Nicky Cadden (born 1996), Scottish footballer
- Suzanne Cadden (born 1957), Scottish amateur golfer
- Thomas Scott Cadden (1923–2007), television commercial producer, director, writer, and songwriter

== See also ==
- Caddens, a suburb of Sydney
