= Pringles =

American brand of snack chips since 1968

- Logo used since 2021, with Julius Pringles
- Product type: Potato snack
- Current owner: Mars Inc.
- Country: United States
- Introduced: 1968 (United States); 1991 (United Kingdom)
- Markets: Worldwide
- Previous owners: Procter & Gamble (1968–2012); Kellanova (2012–2024)
- Website: pringles.com

Pringles is an American brand of stackable potato-based chips invented by Procter & Gamble (P&G) in 1968 and marketed as "Pringle's Newfangled Potato Chips". Pringles are technically considered an extruded snack because of the manufacturing process. The brand was sold in 2012 to Kellanova, which in 2024 was purchased by Mars Inc.

As of 2011, Pringles were sold in more than 140 countries. In 2012, Pringles were the fourth most popular snack brand after Lay's, Doritos, and Cheetos (all manufactured by Frito-Lay), with 2.2% market share globally.

Pringles are made from a mixture of dried potatoes, starches, flours, salts and seasonings. The dough is shaped into a saddle shape, then fried, seasoned, and placed into a cylindrical can.

== History ==
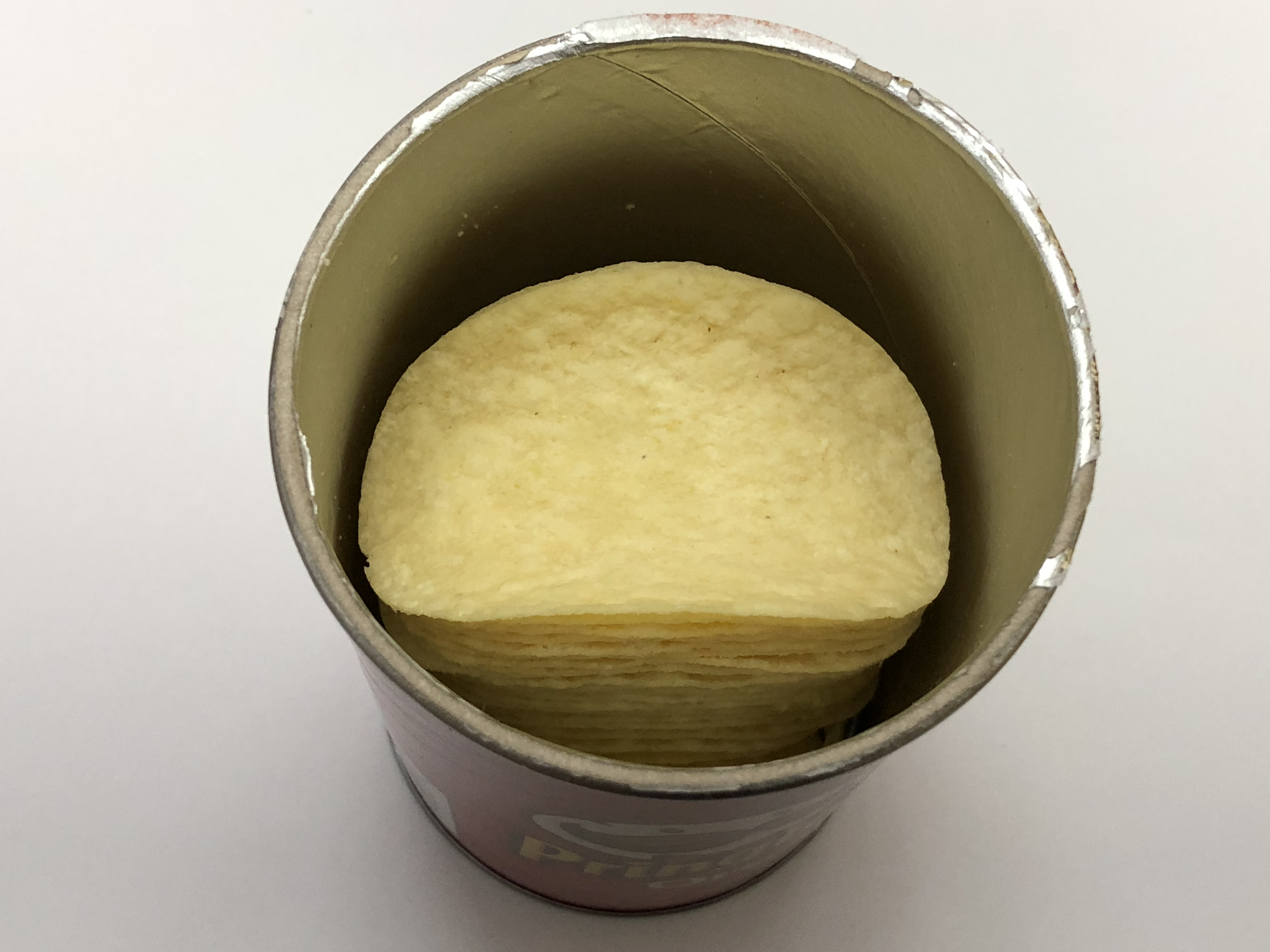
Open canister of Pringles. The tubular can was designed to address customer complaints about broken chips and empty air in the bags.

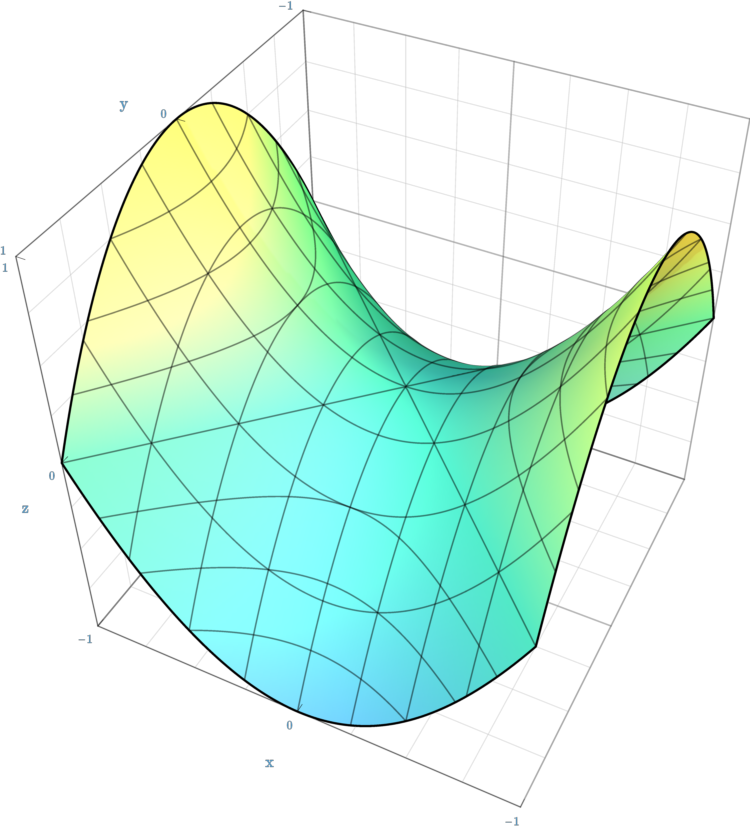
Each Pringles chip is in the mathematical shape of a hyperbolic paraboloid.

In 1956, Procter & Gamble assigned a task to chemist Fredric J. Baur (1918–2008): to develop a new kind of potato chip to address consumer complaints about broken, greasy, and stale chips, as well as air in the bags. Baur spent two years developing saddle-shaped chips from fried dough, and selected a tubular can as the chips' container. The saddle-shape of Pringles chips is mathematically known as a hyperbolic paraboloid. However, Baur could not figure out how to make the chips palatable, and was pulled off the task to work on another brand.

In the mid-1960s, another P&G researcher, Alexander Liepa of Montgomery, Ohio, restarted Baur's work and succeeded in improving the taste. Although Baur designed the shape of the Pringles chip, Liepa's name is on the patent. Gene Wolfe, a mechanical engineer and author known for science fiction and fantasy novels, helped develop the machine that cooked them.

In 1968, P&G first marketed Pringles in Indiana. The earliest mention in an advertisement was on October 3, 1968, where a newspaper in Evansville, Indiana advertised "Pringle Potato Chips" as being "New at Kroger". Afterward, they were gradually distributed across the country and, by 1975, were available across most of the US. By 1991, Pringles were distributed internationally.

Almost simultaneous with the Pringles test-marketing, competitor General Foods first marketed its popcorn-based snack, "Pringle's Pop Chips," in the U.S. But because Procter & Gamble had gotten its product to retailers first, General Foods had to discontinue marketing under its chosen name.

There are several theories behind the origin of the product's name. One theory refers to Mark Pringle, who filed a US Patent 2,286,644 titled "Method and Apparatus for Processing Potatoes" on March 5, 1937. Pringle's work was cited by P&G in filing their own patent for improving the taste of dehydrated processed potatoes. Another theory suggests that two Procter advertising employees lived on Pringle Drive in Finneytown (north of Cincinnati, Ohio), and the name paired well with "potato chips". Another theory says that P&G chose the Pringles name from a Cincinnati telephone book. Another source says that the name Pringles was "chosen out of a hat" to promote a family name appeal.

The product was originally known as Pringle's Newfangled Potato Chips, but other snack manufacturers objected, saying Pringles failed to meet the definition of a potato "chip" since they were made from a potato-based dough rather than being sliced from potatoes. The US Food and Drug Administration weighed in on the matter, and in 1975 they ruled Pringles could only use the word "chip" in their product name within the phrase: "potato chips made from dried potatoes". Faced with such a lengthy and unpalatable appellation, Pringles eventually renamed their product potato "crisps", instead of chips.

In July 2008, in the London High Court, P&G lawyers successfully argued that Pringles were not crisps (the term by which potato chips are known in British English), even though labelled "Potato Crisps" on the container, as the potato content was only 42% and their shape, P&G stated, "is not found in nature". This ruling, against a United Kingdom value added tax (VAT) and Duties Tribunal decision to the contrary, exempted Pringles from the then 17.5% VAT for potato crisps and potato-derived snacks. In May 2009, the Court of Appeal reversed the earlier decision. A spokesman for P&G stated it had been paying the VAT proactively and owed no back taxes.

In April 2011, P&G agreed to the US$2.35 billion sale of the brand to Diamond Foods of California, a deal which would have more than tripled the size of Diamond's snack business. However, the deal fell through in February 2012 after a year-long delay due to issues over Diamond's accounts. On May 31, 2012, Kellogg's officially acquired Pringles for $2.695 billion as part of a plan to grow its international snacks business. The acquisition of Pringles made Kellogg's the second-largest snack company in the world. In 2024, Kellanova, Kellogg's parent company, agreed to be purchased by Mars Inc.

As of 2015, there were five Pringles factories worldwide: in Jackson, Tennessee; Mechelen, Belgium; Johor, Malaysia; Kutno, Poland; and Fujian, China.

In 2020, Kellogg's began trialling a new Pringles can design aiming to be more recyclable, after criticisms by a recycling trade body about the difficulty of reclaiming materials from used cans.

== Ingredients ==
Pringles have about 42% potato content, the remainder being wheat starch and flours (corn and rice) combined with vegetable oils, an emulsifier, salt, and seasoning. Other ingredients can include sweeteners such as maltodextrin and dextrose, monosodium glutamate (MSG), disodium inosinate, disodium guanylate, sodium caseinate, modified food starch, monoglyceride and diglyceride, autolyzed yeast extract, natural and artificial flavorings, malted barley flour, wheat bran, dried black beans, sour cream, cheddar cheese, etc.; Pringles varieties vary in their ingredients.

Pringles also produces several "tortilla" and "multi-grain" varieties which have some of their base starch ingredients replaced with corn flour, rice, wheat bran, black beans, and barley flour. At one point in the early 1990s, "Corn Pringles" were available; the canister was black and had cartoon images of corn. The chips were made of corn and resembled a corn chip in flavor and texture. Rice Pringles were also available in the UK which has a lighter texture, less saturated fat and less salt when compared to traditional pringles.

== Nutrition ==
One serving of about 15 Pringles (Original flavor) contains 150 calories, 2.5 g of saturated fat, 150 mg of sodium, 110 mg of potassium, and 1 g of protein.

== Flavors ==
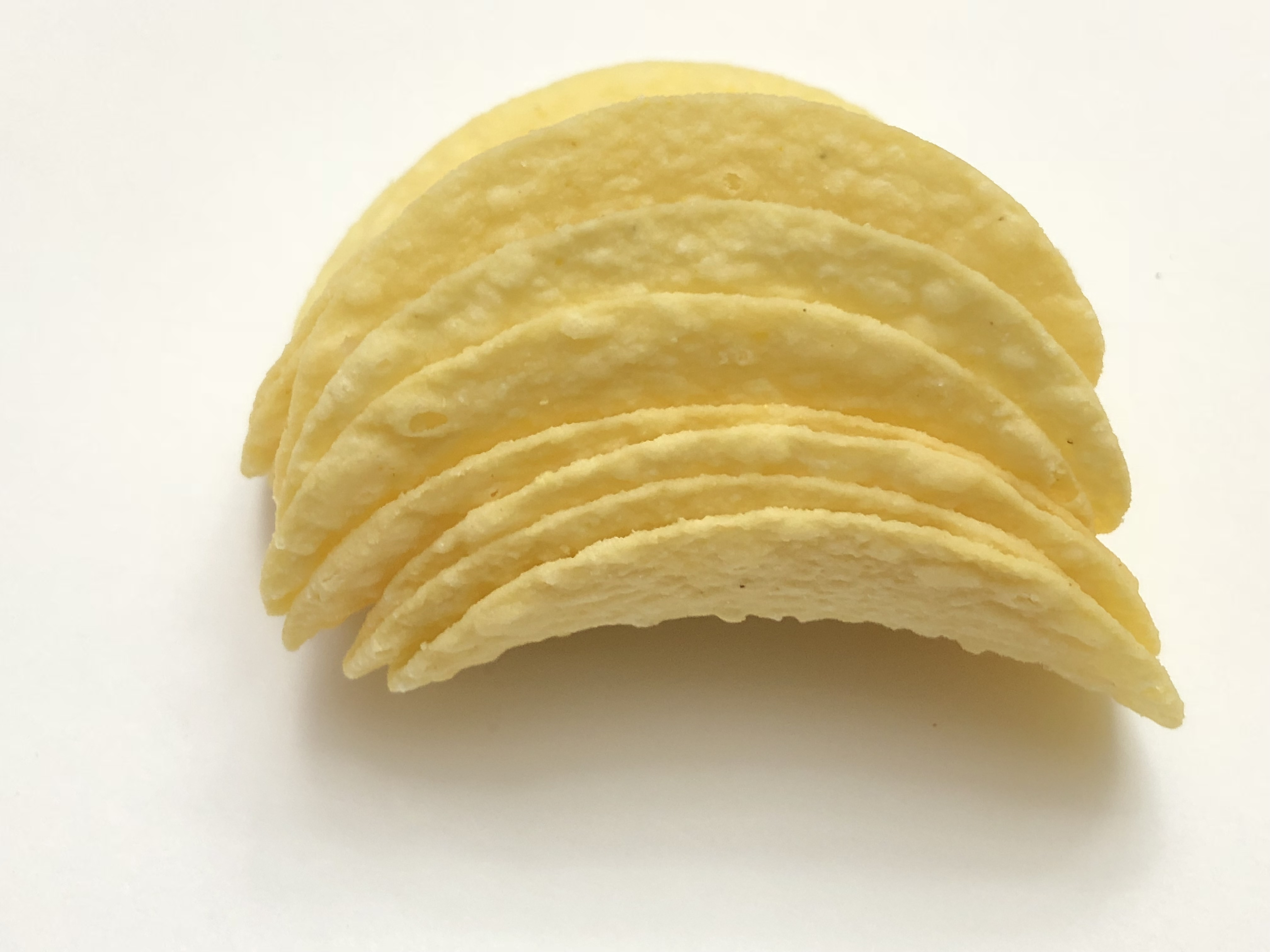
Original

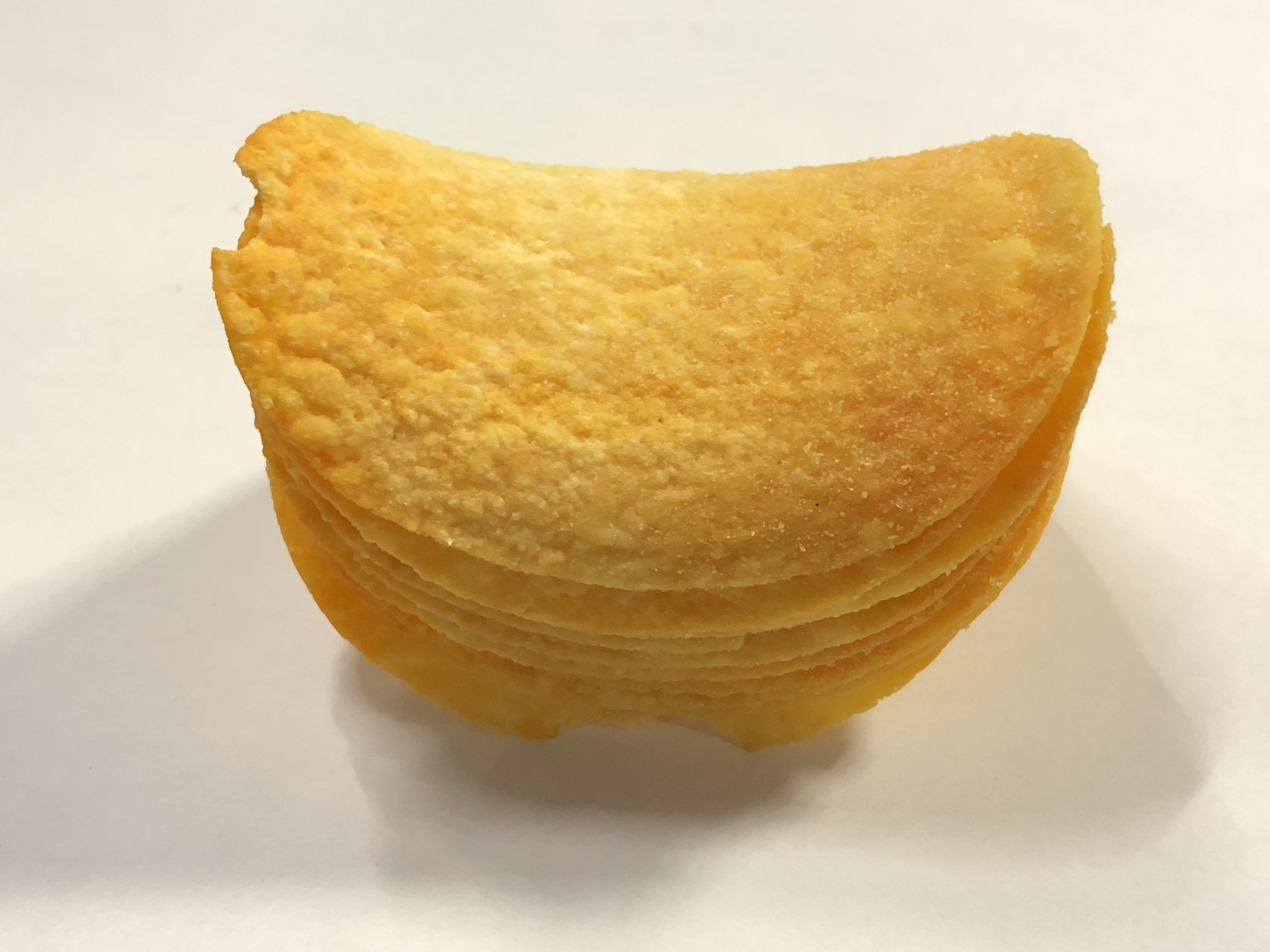
Cheddar cheese flavor

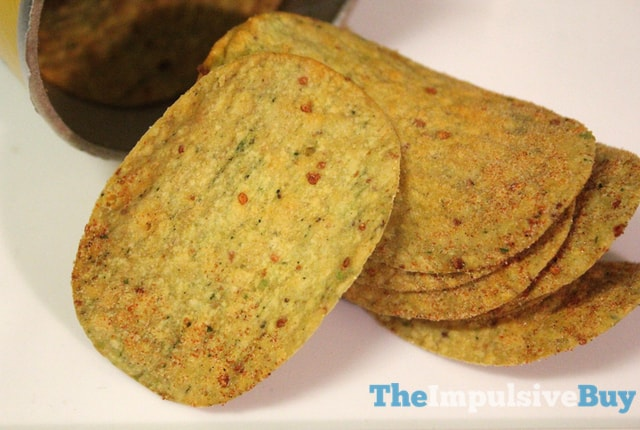
"Loud Margherita Pizza"

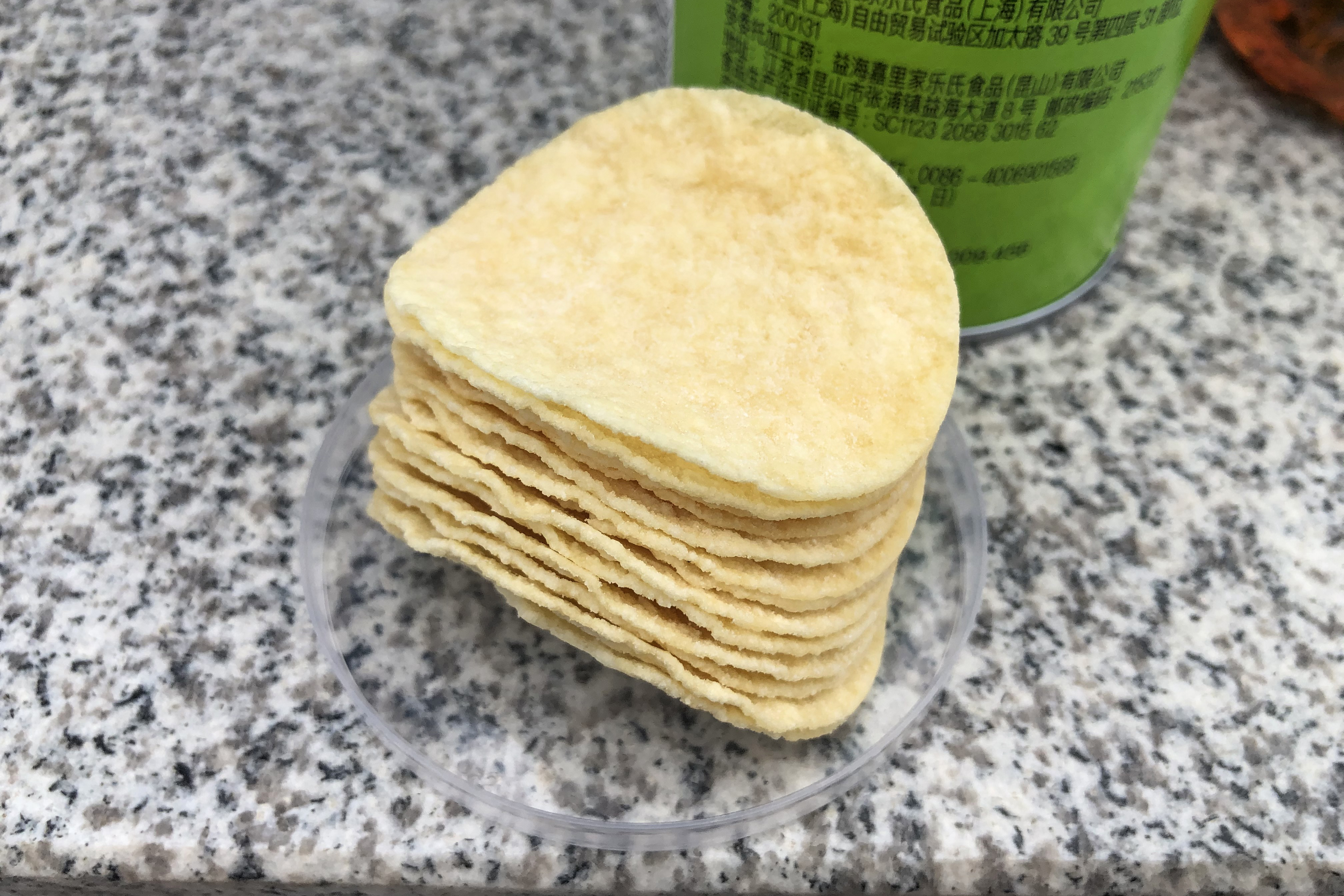
Sour cream and onion flavor

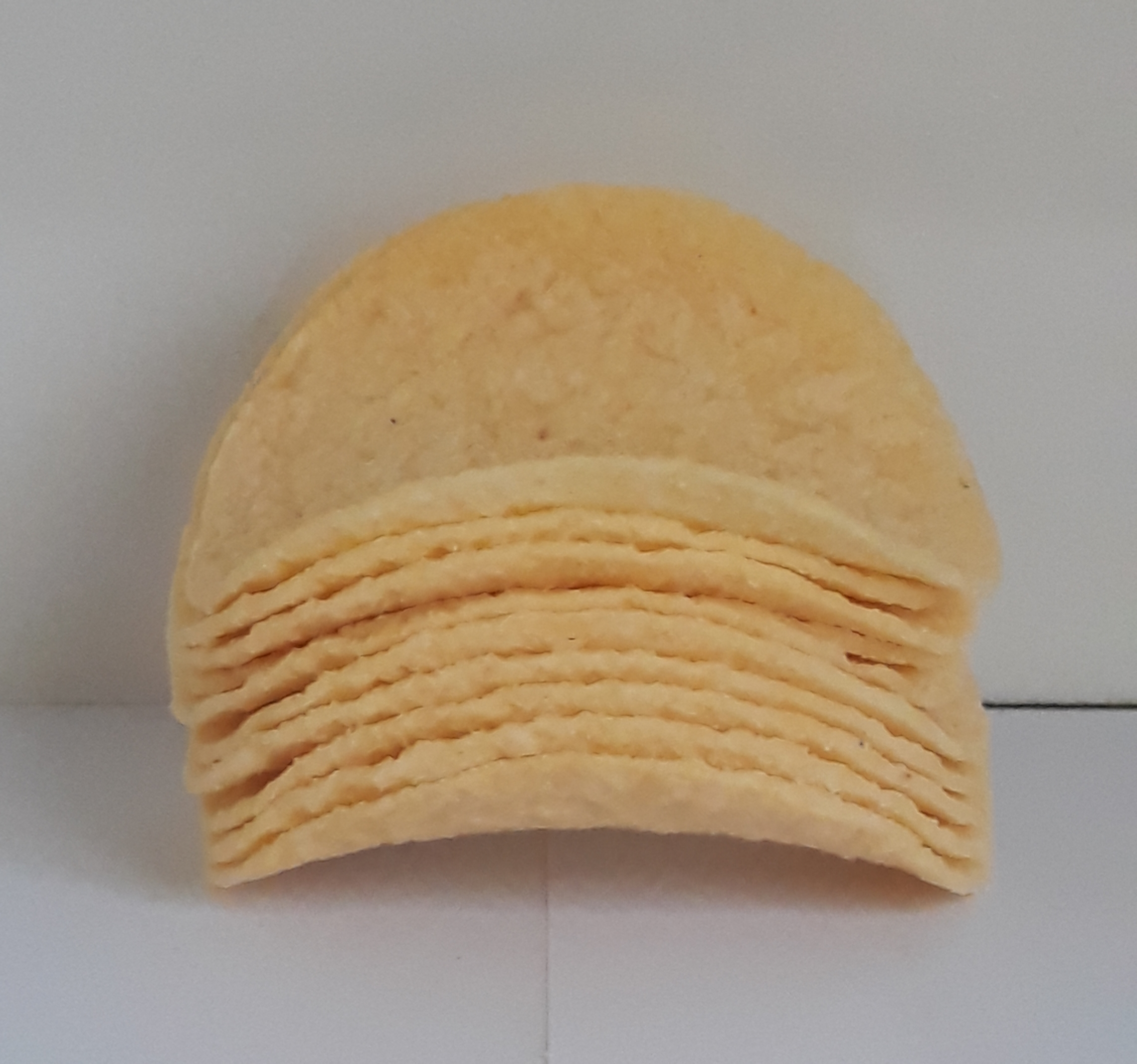
Salt and vinegar flavor

Pringles are available in several flavors. Until the 1980s, only the original flavor was available in the US. Standard flavors in the US as of 2020 include original, salt and vinegar, sour cream and onion, cheddar cheese, ranch dressing, barbecue, hot and spicy, and loaded baked potato. Some flavors are distributed only to limited market areas; for example, prawn cocktail, wasabi, and curry flavors have been available in the United Kingdom and the Republic of Ireland.

Occasionally, P&G has produced limited edition runs. Seasonal flavors, past and present, include ketchup, zesty lime and chili, chili cheese dog, "pizzalicious", paprika, Texas BBQ sauce, buffalo wing, and cajun. A "low-fat" variety was also sold. Examples of limited edition flavors include jalapeño, honey mustard, cheesy fries, onion blossom, mozzarella cheese stick, screamin' dill pickle, and Mexican-layered dip. In 2012, the seasonal flavors "peppermint white chocolate", cinnamon sugar, and "pumpkin pie spice" were introduced.

Other examples of limited runs only in certain parts of the world include mozzarella stick with marinara in North America and jalapeño in Latin America, also soft-shelled crab, grilled shrimp, seaweed, "blueberry and hazelnut", and "lemon and sesame" in Asia in early 2010s. The grilled shrimp chips are pink in color, while the seaweed variety is green.

Two limited-market flavors, cheeseburger and "Taco Night", were recalled in March 2010 as a safety precaution after Salmonella was found in a Basic Food Flavors plant which produced the flavor-enhancing hydrolyzed vegetable protein used in those flavors.

== Marketing ==
Pringles is advertised in the United States, Canada, the United Kingdom, Australia and Ireland with the slogan "Once you pop, the fun don't stop" along with the original slogan "Once you pop, you can't stop!"

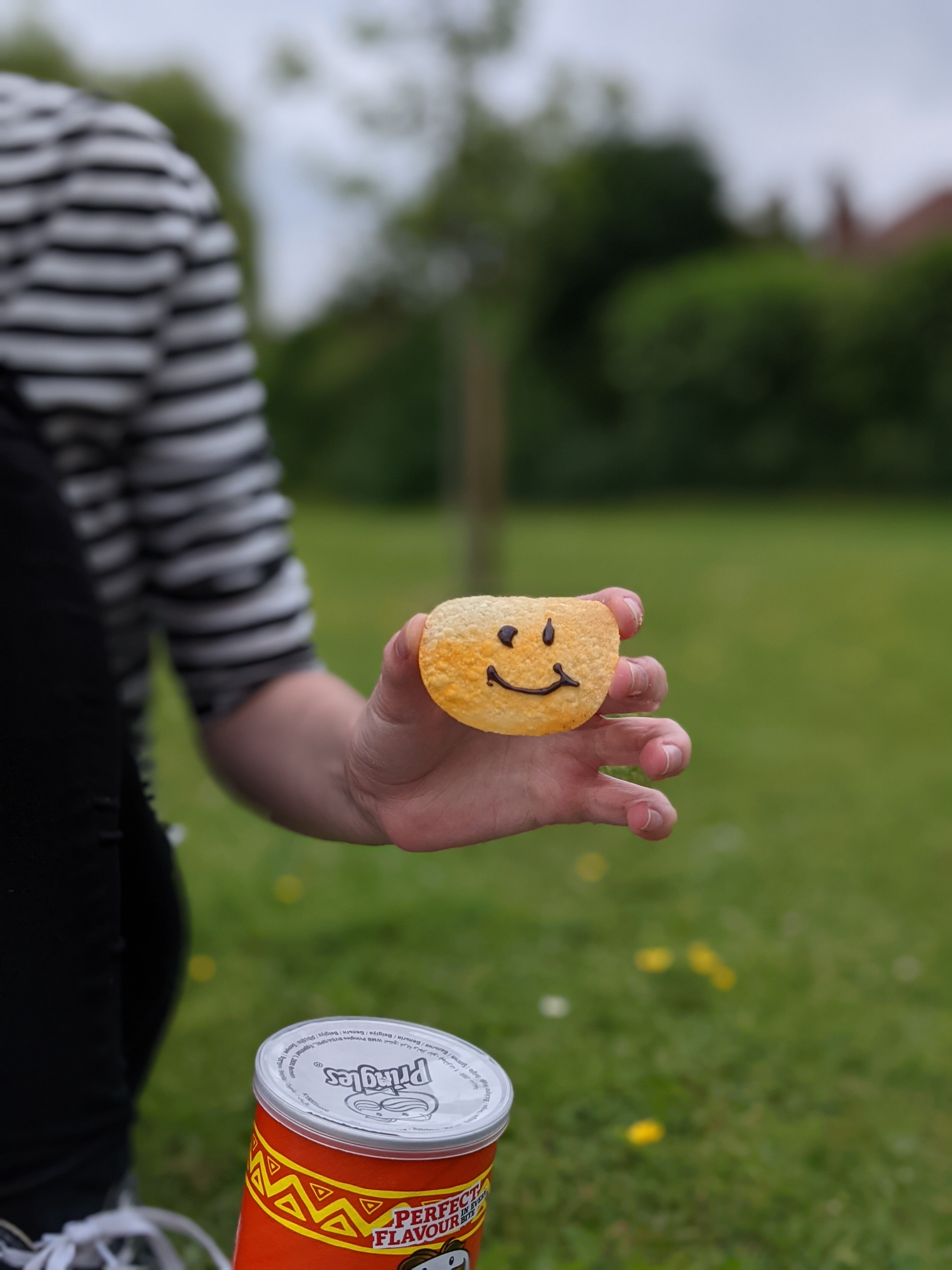
A peri-peri chicken flavored Pringle, detailed with a fondant smiley face

The original Pringles television commercials were written, produced and directed by Thomas Scott Cadden (composer of the original Mr. Clean jingle) in 1968, while working at Tatham-Laird and Kudner Advertising Agency in Chicago.

Throughout its history, Pringles used its print and television advertising campaigns to compare their products to conventional potato chips. In its early years, they were marketed as "Pringles Newfangled Potato Chips" and had a small silver pull-top to open the can. Unlike the current advertising, they only mentioned that, with their pull-top cans (which have been replaced with foil tops since the late 1980s), their chips remain fresh and unbroken, the can holds as many chips as a typical large bag, and their curvy shape allows them to be stackable; thus inspiring the slogan, "Other potato chips just don't stack up."

Pringles, as a product brand, is especially known for its packaging, a tubular paperboard can with a foil-lined interior (until the 1980s, the cans also contained a removable pleated paper liner which held the chips in place) and a resealable plastic lid, which was invented by Fredric J. Baur, an organic chemist and food storage technician who specialized in research and development and quality control for Cincinnati-based Procter & Gamble. Baur's children honored his request to bury him in one of the cans by placing part of his cremated remains in a Pringles container in his grave.

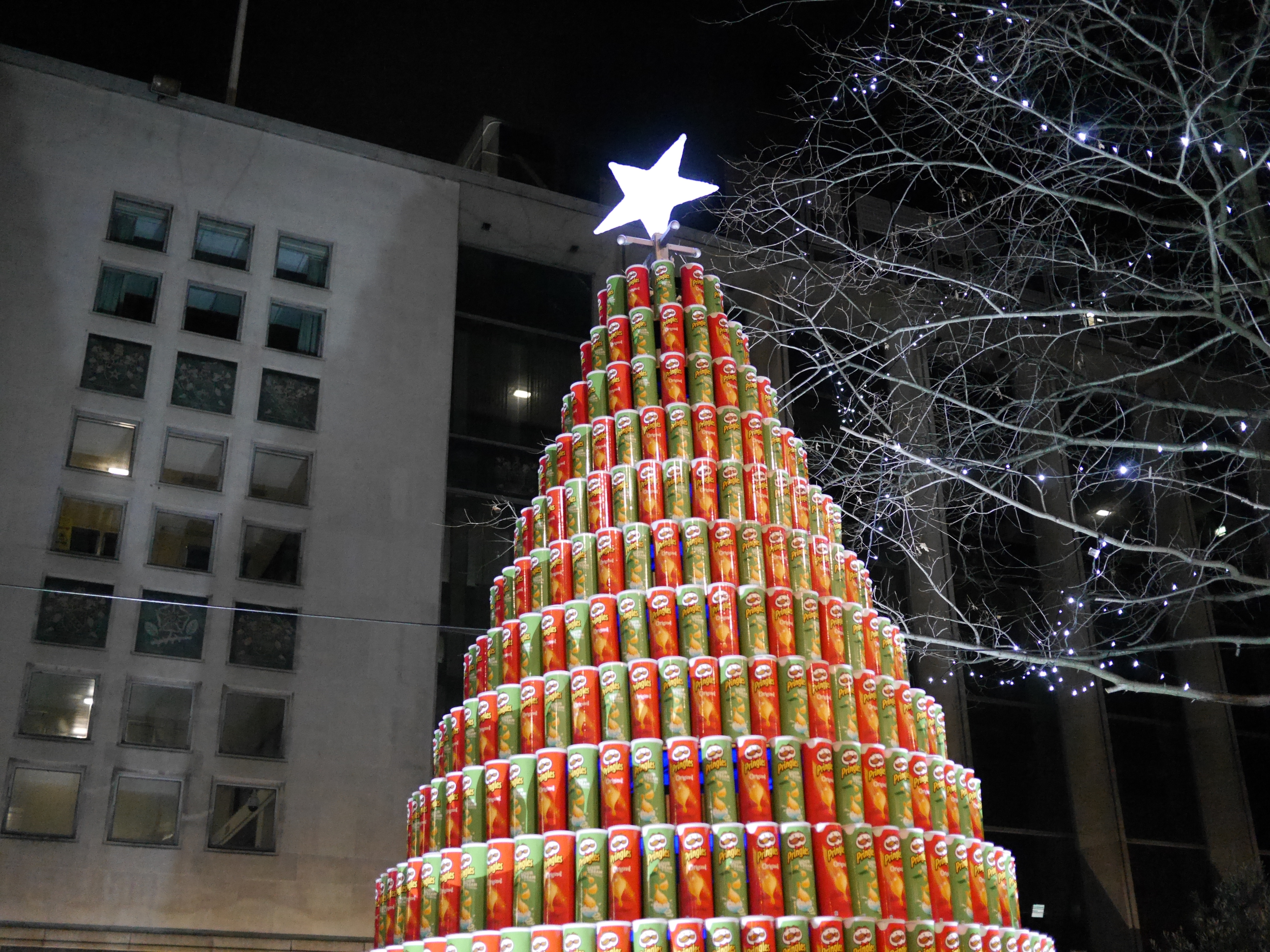
Pringles Christmas tree in Spinningfields, Manchester, England in 2014

The can has been criticized for being difficult to recycle due to the multiple materials used in its construction.

In 2013, Lucasfilm and Pringles jointly commissioned crowdsourcing video studio Tongal for a commercial, with a total of $75,000 in prize money distributed to seven finalists.

In January 2021, a Pringles campaign took the character Frank out of the Raw Fury video game West of Dead in a live Twitch stream. Leahviathan, a gaming influencer, was playing the game and Frank reached through the screen, entered the real world and interacted with players.

The aerodynamics of Pringles chips (as well as other consumer products) have been optimized for food processing using supercomputers. Kellogg's has used this fact in a 2022 Pringles advertisement campaign.

== Logo and mascot ==
The Pringles logo is a stylized cartoon caricature of the head of a male figure designed by Louis R. Dixon, with a large mustache and parted bangs (until 2001, the character had eyebrows and his bow tie framed the product name; in 1998, the bangs and lips were removed from the logo, and his head was widened a little). In 2020, the character was again revised with a minimalistic approach to generally negative reception.

The mascot originally had no name, and the name originated with a Wikipedia hoax; in 2006, an editor inserted the then-hoax "Julius" into the Pringles Wikipedia article, which was subsequently picked up by other news outlets. The editors supported and promoted their claim through creating a Facebook page to raise awareness of Julius Pringles being his name. Prior to this the mascot was officially known only as "Mr. P", no first name. By 2013, the name had spread and in a case of citogenesis-turned-real, Kellogg's formally acknowledged Julius Pringles (abbreviated as "Mr. P").

== See also ==
- Lay's Stax
- Pringles Unsung
