= Highness (song) =

Single by Envy & Other Sins

from the album We Leave at Dawn
- Released: 3 March 2008
- Recorded: 2008
- Genre: Indie rock
- Length: 3:44
- Songwriters: Envy & Other Sins
- Producer: Danton Supple

Envy & Other Sins singles chronology
"Man Bites God" (2007)	"Highness" (2008)

"Highness" is a song by the British indie rock band Envy & Other Sins. It was released on 3 March 2008 as the lead single from their debut album We Leave at Dawn, and peaked at number 65 on the UK Singles Chart.

== Background ==
Envy & Other Sins rose to prominence as contestants on the Channel 4 TV programme mobileAct Unsigned, a talent competition sometimes described as an "indie X Factor". During the series, the band were eliminated by the judges in the competition's later stages, before being brought back by a public vote as wild cards. The band performed "Highness" on the final episode, and ultimately won the competition over runners up Revenue. Their prize for winning was a million-pound record deal with A&M Records, which included an album and two singles.

== Recording and release ==
Following their win on mobileAct Unsigned, Envy & Other Sins recorded "Highness" and the rest of their debut album, We Leave at Dawn. With the exception of lead singer Ali Forbes's vocals, which were recorded at Robannas Studios in Birmingham, "Highness" was recorded at Olympic Studios in London. The song was produced by Danton Supple, and was engineered by Rob Smith and Paul Gray.

"Highness" was released as a single on 3 March in three formats: CD single, 7-inch and digital download. The CD single featured a new original song—"Orient Express"—as a B-side, which was mixed by Gisli at Goodbeating. The B-side of the 7-inch included two new tracks, "When Saturday Comes" and "You've Got Something".

== Composition and style ==
Stylistically, "Highness" has been associated with Britpop and late-1990s indie rock. Writing for This Is Fake DIY, Stuart McCaighy detected a "Bluetones-esque" air to the song, while noting that, although it would not have been out of place in the Britpop era, it did not sound dated nor deliberately retro. Dan Grabham of Stuff described "Highness" as catchy, and compared its sound to "Franz Ferdinand having a pillow fight with the Kaiser Chiefs while the Bluetones play Britpop covers next door". Alex Fletcher of Digital Spy compared "Highness" to the "jangly guitar" style of early Supergrass and the art rock sound of Franz Ferdinand.

== Reception ==
Critical reception to "Highness" was positive. McCaighy awarded the song of 3.5 stars out of 5, and praised its polished production, deftness, and charm, saying that the band's victory on mobileAct Unsigned was justified. McCaighy described the song as easy to "fall in love with", but acknowledged that it might be considered too gentle or pop-oriented for some indie purists. Fletcher praised the "Highness", and felt that the song demonstrated that Envy & Other Sins deserved "more than jibes about being the indie equivalent of Leona Lewis". In a review of We Leave at Dawn for Drowned in Sound, Mike Diver compared "Highness" to Envy & Other Sins' tourmates The Hoosiers, and felt that the song had been "done right". Natalie Shaw of Gigwise described the track as a "storming single", while Dan Gennoe of Yahoo! Music UK praised the song as a "piece of quintessentially English indie-pop". In contrast, a review of a more critical nature came from NME, who slated the band as "indie X Factor desperados" and the song as "1998-era Britpop (worst year ever)".

Following its release on 3 March 2008, "Highness" peaked at number 65 on the UK Singles Chart for the week ending 15 March. That same week, the single charted at number 20 on the UK Physical Singles Chart.

== Formats and track listings ==
- CD single
1. "Highness" – 3:44
2. "Orient Express" – 3:33
- 7" vinyl
1. "Highness"
2. "When Saturday Comes"
3. "You've Got Something"
- Digital download
1. "Highness" – 3:43

== Chart performance ==
Chart (2008)	Peak position
UK Singles (OCC)	65
UK Physical Singles (OCC)	20
