= We Leave at Dawn =

Studio album by Envy & Other Sins
- Released: 31 March 2008
- Genre: Indie rock
- Length: 41:53
- Label: Polydor
- Producer: Danton Supple

We Leave at Dawn is the only studio album by British band Envy & Other Sins. It was released on 31 March 2008 by Polydor Records.

== Track listing ==
All tracks are written by Envy & Other Sins.

No.	Title	Length
1.	"Morning Sickness"	3:14
2.	"Almost Certainly Elsewhere"	3:45
3.	"Highness"	3:41
4.	"Step Across"	3:12
5.	"Man Bites God"	3:32
6.	"Don't Start Fires"	4:45
7.	"The Company We Keep"	4:34
8.	"(It Gets Harder to Be A) Martyr"	4:17
9.	"Talk to Strangers"	3:30
10.	"Shipwrecked"	7:27
Total length:		41:53

== Personnel ==
The following people are credited on the album:

Envy & Other Sins

- Ali Forbes – lead vocals, electric guitar, acoustic guitar
- Mark Lees – bass guitar, backing vocals
- Jim Macaulay – drums
- Jarvey Moss – keyboards, backing vocals

Additional musicians

- Flick Murphy – additional vocals (track 10), violin
- John Garner – violin
- Stephanie Edmundson – viola
- Mark Walken – cello

Production

- Danton Supple – producer, mixing
- Smit & Andy Savours – engineering
- Gordon Davidson – assistant engineer
- Zoe Smith – assistant engineer
- Alex MacKenzie – assistant engineer

Artwork

- Envy & Other Sins – artwork, design
- Angelfire Creative – artwork, design
