= Pringles Unsung =

UK music competition

- Genre: Music competition
- Location: United Kingdom
- Years active: 2006–07
- Founders: Pringles
- Website: pringlesunsung.com

Pringles Unsung was a music competition in the United Kingdom that ran once from 2006 to 2007. It was sponsored by the Pringles snack brand, and was one of several brand-sponsored music competitions to be launched during this period. The competition invited unsigned artists to upload a song to the official Pringles Unsung website, where they could then be voted on by the general public and a panel of judges. The most popular songs from each of seven regions progressed to regional heats in Newcastle upon Tyne, Birmingham, Ipswich, Kingston upon Thames, Leeds, Bristol and Plymouth. The winners of the regional heats then competed in a grand final, where they each performed in front of the judging panel. The judging panel consisted of producers Kevin Bacon and Jonathan Quarmby, ex-Island Records managing director Marc Marot, journalist Paul Sexton and Echo & the Bunnymen lead singer Ian McCulloch. McCulloch had become involved as he wanted to encourage exciting new music.

The winners of the Pringles Unsung were Cardiff group The Toy Band, who won with their track "Riff Song". McCulloch described the band as being "great musicians" with "the magic ingredient". Their prize was to record a demo produced by Bacon and Quarmby and to receive management advice from Marot.

Response to the competition was mixed. The public relations and communications company GCI London were shortlisted for their role in Pringles Unsung in the Consumer Award category at the 2007 PRCA Awards, but lost out to Nelson Bostock Communications for "An Extremis Success". Adam Webb of The Guardian described the competition as a "nadir" of music competitions, and that a band's associating with it was "liable to kill the most credible career".

== See also ==
- Orange unsignedAct – a similar competition
