= Orange Playlist =

British TV series

Orange Playlist is a British music chat show TV series, produced by INITIAL, a subsidiary of Endemol UK for the ITV Network. The third series was presented by Jayne Middlemiss. A different guest each week joins Middlemiss to discuss their lives, nominating a variety of songs to be played, one from their future, past and present, as well as their favourite track of all time.

The show was originally presented by Lauren Laverne.

== See also ==
- Orange unsignedAct – a similar music TV show sponsored by Orange and featuring Laverne
