= T in the Park 2009 =

Music festival in Scotland

- Genre: Various
- Dates: 9 – 12 July 2009
- Locations: Balado, Perth and Kinross, Scotland
- Website: http://www.tinthepark.com

T in the Park 2009 was the sixteenth T in the Park festival held since 1994. Held on the weekend of Friday, 10 July – Sunday, 12 July, at Balado, in Perth and Kinross, and Scotland. Bands like Kings of Leon, Snow Patrol, Blur and The Killers headlined. 2009 was the first time the festival had seen four headliners. In the 2009 festival, the campsite officially opened the first day of the festival (a Thursday evening) to prevent traffic queues forming on Friday.

== Build Up ==
The first batch of "early bird" tickets sold out in ten hours on 15 July 2008. On 27 February 2009, NME announced that camping tickets for the event had already sold out.

Festival organiser Geoff Ellis announced that the festival would feature more than 120 acts, playing to an audience of 85,000 people. On 31 January 2009, the first acts for the 2009 festival were confirmed as Katy Perry and Bloc Party, with Kings of Leon and Snow Patrol confirmed as Friday and Sunday night headliners respectively. The Killers were confirmed to headline Saturday, with Blur announced to be joint-headliners of the final night. This marked the first time that the festival had been billed as having four headline bands.

== The Festival ==
=== Inside the Arena ===
The Main Stage, Radio 1/NME Stage, King Tut's Wah Wah Tent, Slam Tent and the T-Break Stage all returned for the festival. The Futures Stage also returned but was renamed to the Red Bull Bedroom Jam Futures Stage. The Pet Sounds Stage did not return. New to the festival was the BBC Introducing Stage, where relatively new and unsigned acts performed.

The Ceilidh Tent also returned, hosting traditional Scottish music, as did the Bacardi B-Live Tent featuring a cocktail bar and dance floor with electronic music.

Due to its popularity the previous year, the Healthy T arena was retained for the festival, hosting numerous stalls supplying nutritious and healthy food in comparison to the various fast food vans that operate throughout the main arena.

=== Performances ===
The Horrors, who were due to play early on the Saturday, pulled out late due to one of the band's members falling ill.

On the Sunday, several of the earlier bands had to change their time slots by roughly an hour to cover the non-appearance of The Game. Ladyhawke also pulled out of her slot due to flu-like symptoms and was replaced by a second performance by Dundonian band The Law. The festival was put into further disarray in the evening with the possibility that Blur would pull out at the last minute due to guitarist Graham Coxon being apparently ill in hospital with food poisoning. Rumours circulating at the time suggested that the band had in fact fallen out before their set, but this was later denied. The festival times were pushed back by one and a half hours for Snow Patrol and Blur. It was announced by Blur once they had taken stage that their performance would be the last time they would play together and that this was the reason Coxon left the hospital to play.

== Line-up ==
=== Main Stage ===
Friday 10 July	Saturday 11 July	Sunday 12 July
Kings of Leon; Franz Ferdinand; Maxïmo Park; James Morrison	The Killers; Razorlight; The Specials; James; Paolo Nutini; Lady Gaga; Calvin Harris; Björn Again	Blur; Snow Patrol; Elbow; Bloc Party; The Script; Seasick Steve; Squeeze; The Parsonage

=== Radio 1 / NME Stage ===
Friday 10 July	Saturday 11 July	Sunday 12 July
Nick Cave and The Bad Seeds; Yeah Yeah Yeahs; Idlewild; The Mars Volta	Nine Inch Nails; Jane's Addiction; The Ting Tings; Katy Perry; White Lies; Starsailor; You Me at Six; ~~The Horrors~~ (cancelled); That Petrol Emotion	Keane; Pendulum; Lily Allen; Doves; Eagles of Death Metal; ~~The Game~~ (cancelled); The Dykeenies; The Gaslight Anthem; In Case of Fire

=== King Tut's Tent ===
Friday 10 July	Saturday 11 July	Sunday 12 July
The View; The Courteeners; Jamie T; Edwyn Collins; The Maccabees	Manic Street Preachers; Glasvegas; Jason Mraz; Foals; Friendly Fires; The Noisettes; M83; Iglu & Hartly; Mumford & Sons	Pet Shop Boys; TV on the Radio; Mogwai; Peter Doherty; Regina Spektor; The Saturdays; Daniel Merriweather; Gary Go; Carolina Liar

=== Slam Tent ===
Saturday 11 July	Sunday 12 July
2 Many DJs; Laurent Garnier; Green Velvet; Felix da Housecat; Slam; Mr Scruff; Beardyman; Claude VonStroke; Silicone Soul	Jeff Mills; The Streets; Dave Clarke; Simian Mobile Disco; Tiga; Boys Noize; Ben Sims; Joris Voorn; Funk D'Void

=== Futures Stage ===
Friday 10 July	Saturday 11 July	Sunday 12 July
Crystal Castles; The Twang; Go:Audio; Camera Obscura; Vagabond; Will and the People; Saving Aimee	Florence and the Machine; Of Montreal; Twin Atlantic; Metronomy; Fight Like Apes; The Virgins; Dinosaur Pile-Up; The Hours; Delphic; My Passion; Lady Lykez	The Airborne Toxic Event; ~~Ladyhawke~~ (cancelled); Jack Peñate; Patrick Wolf; Little Boots; Passion Pit; Hockey; VV Brown; General Fiasco; The Auteur; The Tunics

=== T Break Stage ===
Friday 10 July	Saturday 11 July	Sunday 12 July
The Phantom Band; Pearl and the Puppets; The Temper Trap; Ming Ming and the Ching Chings; Dead Boy Robotics; Maple Leaves; Homework	1990s; Wallis Bird; Hip Parade; Sucioperro; Priscilla Ahn; Jill Jackson; Healthy Minds Collapse; Punch and The Apostles; Trapped In Kansas; Bronto Skylift; The French Quarter; Mike Nisbet; Gong Fei	Tommy Reilly; We Were Promised Jetpacks; Iain Archer; The Big Pink; Cassidy; Paper Planes; Pulled Apart By Horses; My Cousin I Bid You Farewell; Brother Louis Collective; Barn Owl; Little Eskimos; Tango In The Attic; G1FT

=== BBC Introducing Stage ===
Saturday 11 July	Sunday 12 July
Telegraphs; Broken Records; Cathouse; Answering Machine; Young Fathers; The Locals; Unicorn Kid; The Law; My Luminaries; Lowkey; Alex Gardener	Dananananaykroyd; Seal Cub Clubbing Club; Hitchcock; Milk Kan; Alto Elite; Decimals; Dally King; Ezra Bang & Hot Machine; The Twilight Sad; Leni Ward; Findo Gask
