= Malpas (band) =

English folktronica band

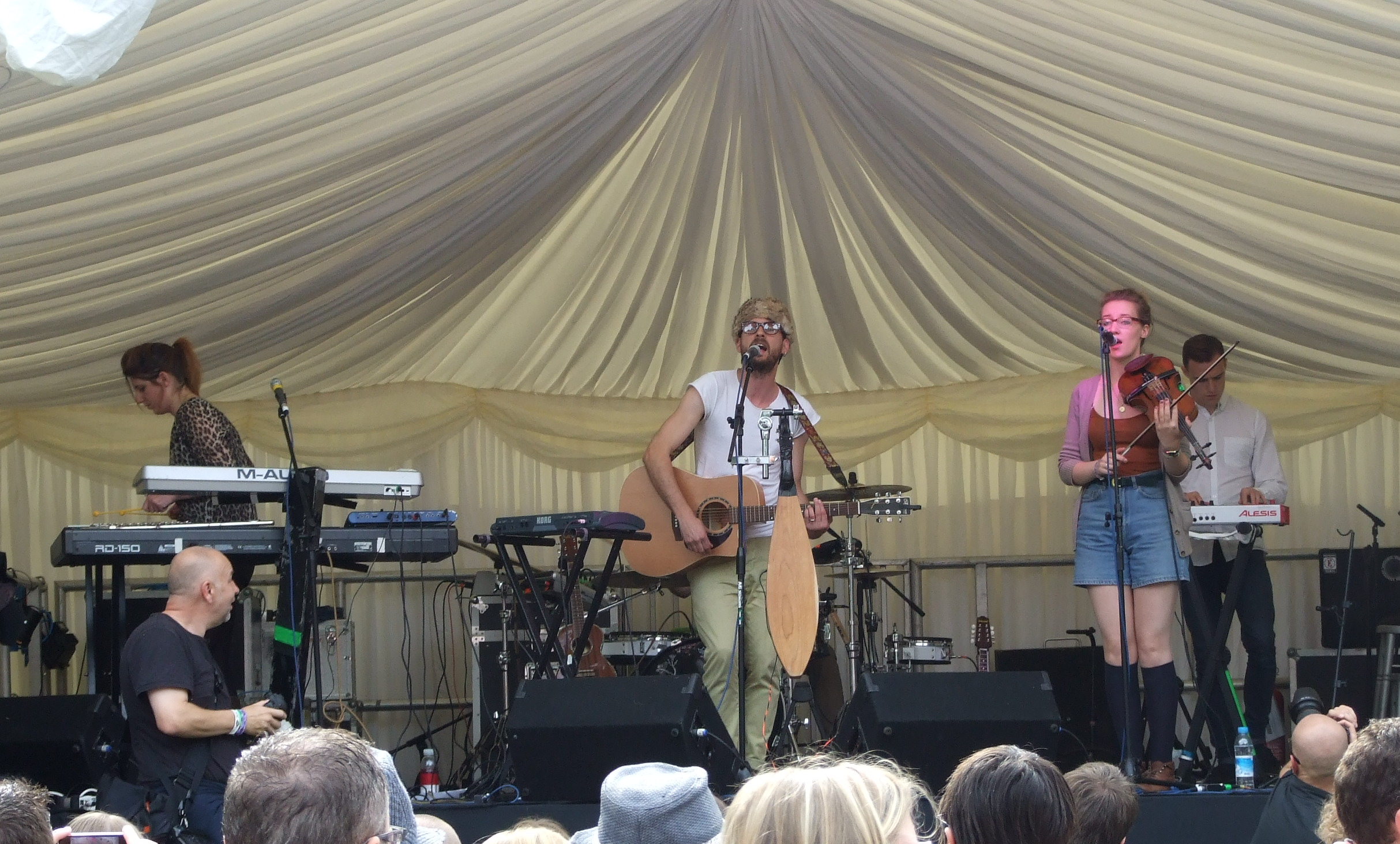
- Malpas performing in 2010

Background information
- Origin: Birmingham, UK
- Genres: Folktronica
- Years active: 2009–present
- Labels: Killing Moon; Yebo
- Members: Ali M Forbes; Andy Savours
- Website: malpasmusic.co.uk

Malpas are an English folktronica duo consisting of Ali Forbes and Andy Savours. Formed in Birmingham in 2009, their music combines folk music and electronic music to create a sound that has been compared to Sigur Rós and The Postal Service. They released their debut EP, Promise, in 2013, and their debut album Rain River Sea in 2015.

== Career ==
Malpas began in a King's Heath, Birmingham attic in July 2009, after producer Andy Savours helped vocalist and songwriter Ali Forbes with looping acoustic instruments. Savours had previously produced and engineered for Sigur Rós, My Bloody Valentine, and The Killers; Forbes was a member of Envy & Other Sins. Savours later moved to Dalston, London.

Malpas released their first EP, Promise, on 23 September 2013. The Line of Best Fit described one of its singles, "Charlemagne", as "somewhere in-between Zach Condon [...] and M83"; KLOF Magazine praised the EP for "rais[ing] the stakes of invention".

On 31 July 2015, Malpas released their debut album, Rain River Sea, on the record labels Killing Moon and Yebo. During its creation, Forbes lived in Birmingham while Savours lived in Dalston; they composed the album by passing tracks to each other over email. The album's lyrics use metaphors relating to different forms of water—rain, rivers, and the ocean—to convey certainty, journeys, and vastness respectively. Rain River Sea was generally received positively, with The Sunday Times describing it as "chilled, calming, delicate but gently uplifting" and Malpas as "a promising new project".

== Musical style ==
Malpas's music uses elements from both electronic music and folk music. For example, "Us Afloat" combines a ukelele with synths and trip-hop beats, and songs from Rain River Sea use mandolins in an electronica style. The method in which Malpas combines electronic music and folk music is often highlighted as contradictory and unique by reviewers. Their music has been described as folktronica and electropop; they have been compared to bands such as The Postal Service, M83, and Sigur Rós.

== Members ==
- Ali M Forbes
- Andy Savours

== Discography ==
=== Albums ===
- Rain River Sea (2015)

=== EPs ===
- Promise EP (2013)
- Under Her Sails (2015)
- Where the River Runs (Remixes) (2015)

=== Singles ===
- "Promise" (2013)
- "Charlemagne" (2013)
- "Under Her Sails" (2015)
- "Where the River Runs" (2015)
