= Envy & Other Sins =

British music band

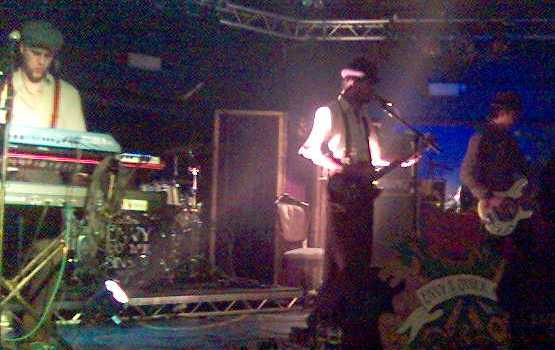
- Envy & Other Sins performing in February 2006 (L-R: Jarvey Moss, Ali M. Forbes, Mark E. Lees)

Background information
- Origin: Birmingham, England
- Genres: Emo, industrial, alternative, punk, pop punk
- Years active: 2004–2009
- Labels: A&M, Loog, Gentlemen Prefer
- Past members: Ali M. Forbes (vocals/guitar); Jarvey Moss (synth); Mark E. Lees (bass); Jim "McDrum" Macaulay (drums)

Envy & Other Sins was a four-piece band from Birmingham, England, who came to fame by winning Channel 4's nationwide talent show, mobileAct unsigned. They were the winners of the show, on which they won a £60,000 record contract with A&M Records. The contract allowed them to release one album and two singles. Their first single, "Highness", was released on 3 March 2008, and their debut album, We Leave at Dawn, was released on 31 March 2008.

On 1 July 2009, the band announced they were to split up, with Ali Forbes becoming the singer of Malpas and Jim Macaulay becoming the drummer for Eliot Sumner, Emmy the Great and The Stranglers during the next decade.

== Musical style ==
Writing about the band in November 2006, British music magazine NME described their songs as "catchy in the extreme, with sweet harmonies, wicked hooks and choruses a-go-go".

== Discography ==
=== Albums ===
Year	Album details
2008	We Leave at Dawn: Released: 31 March 2008; Label: Polydor; Format: CD

=== Singles ===
Year	Title	Chart peak positions	Album
Year	Title	UK	Album
2005	"Prodigal Son"	—	Non-album single
2007	"Man Bites God"	—	Non-album single
2008	"Highness"	65	We Leave at Dawn
"—" denotes a release that did not chart.

=== Demo songs ===
- "Man Bites God"
- "Step Across"
- "Talk to Strangers"
- "Tomorrow"
- "(It Gets Harder to Be a) Martyr"
- "Words Fail"
- "Almost Certainly Elsewhere"
- "The Company We Keep"
