= Orange unsignedAct =

British TV series

- Presented by: Alex Zane
- Judges: Simon Gavin; Alex James; Lauren Laverne; Jo Whiley
- Country of origin: United Kingdom
- Original language: English

Original release
- Network: Channel 4

Orange UnsignedAct (known as mobileAct Unsigned during its first series) was a Channel 4 talent competition, with bands and artists competing for a recording contract with Universal Music, a £60,000 advance, a single released after the series, an album deal and a multi-media marketing campaign.

The £60,000 was allocated as follows: 50% on completion of the recording contract and confirmation of the winner and 50% on delivery of the final mixed, mastered and cleared album.

The show was sponsored by Orange and Sony Ericsson.

== Finalists ==
2007

- Envy & Other Sins
- Revenue
- Mancini
- Ginger Bread Men
- Bad Robots

2008/2009

- Scarlet Harlots
- Hip Parade
- Tommy Reilly

== Winners ==
Envy & Other Sins won mobileAct Unsigned on 23 December 2007. As a result, their first single, "Highness", was released on 3 March 2008.

Tommy Reilly won the competition with his song "Gimme A Call". The winner was announced live on Channel 4 at 2:40 pm on Sunday 25 January 2009. The song entered the UK Top 40 at number 14 on 1 February 2009.

== Transmission ==
Sundays T4 (Channel 4) and 4Music, UK

== See also ==
- Orange Playlist – a similar music TV show sponsored by Orange and hosted by Laverne
- Pringles Unsung – a similar competition
