= Richard Black =

American artist (1921–2014)

- Born: Harry Richard Black; October 10, 1921; Philadelphia, Pennsylvania, U.S.
- Died: March 30, 2014 (aged 92); Kettering, Ohio, U.S.
- Known for: Landscape, paint portraits, illustrator
- Notable work: Smokey Bear, Mr. Clean
- Spouse: Virginia Black (died 2003)
- Children: 3

Harry Richard Black (October 10, 1921 – March 30, 2014) was an American commercial artist, illustrator, and portraitist. Black created the original Mr. Clean mascot for Procter & Gamble's household cleaner during the 1950s.

== Biography ==
=== Early life and education ===
Richard Black was born on October 10, 1921, in Philadelphia, Pennsylvania. He enrolled at Syracuse University, but left the school to enlist in the Army Air Corps during World War II. He moved to Ohio after the war and opened an art studio in Dayton. He also taught art at both the University of Dayton and Sinclair Community College on a part-time basis for years.

=== Career ===
Black, who spent much of his career as a commercial artist, worked on projects for a number of companies, ranging from Frigidaire to Shell Oil. However, Black is best known for creating the widely recognized Mr. Clean commercial mascot. Procter & Gamble contacted Black during the 1950s. He was tasked by P&G with creating a new mascot for a forthcoming household cleaning product, to be called Mr. Clean. Executives at Procter & Gamble described the new cleaner as being "like magic" and envisioned the new product's mascot as a genie from a bottle.

Procter & Gamble wanted Black to design a bald man (or genie) with a nose ring. Black created two versions of the genie, one with a nose ring and one without the ring. Procter & Gamble decided to use Black's image without the ring as Mr. Clean. Mr. Clean products were first released to consumers in 1958. A television and radio ad campaign, utilizing Black's Mr. Clean mascot, accompanied the launch of the product line. The company still uses the Mr. Clean character in its marketing, as of 2014.

=== Artist and painter ===
In addition to his commercial work, Black was also a landscape artist and a portrait painter. In 1956, one of his landscape paintings, complete with depictions of animals, was published in The Saturday Evening Post. An official from the United States Department of the Interior liked the painting. The Interior Department soon contacted Black and asked him to illustrate a character to promote wildfire prevention, Smokey Bear. Black kept a life-sized Smokey The Bear statue on his front lawn at his home in Kettering.

=== Death ===
Black died at his home in Kettering, Ohio, on March 30, 2014, at the age of 92. A member of the Fairmont Presbyterian Church, he was survived by his three sons, Richard, Christopher and Timothy, and seven grandchildren. His wife, Virginia Black, died in 2003.
