= Fred Baur =

American organic chemist and food storage scientist (1918–2008)

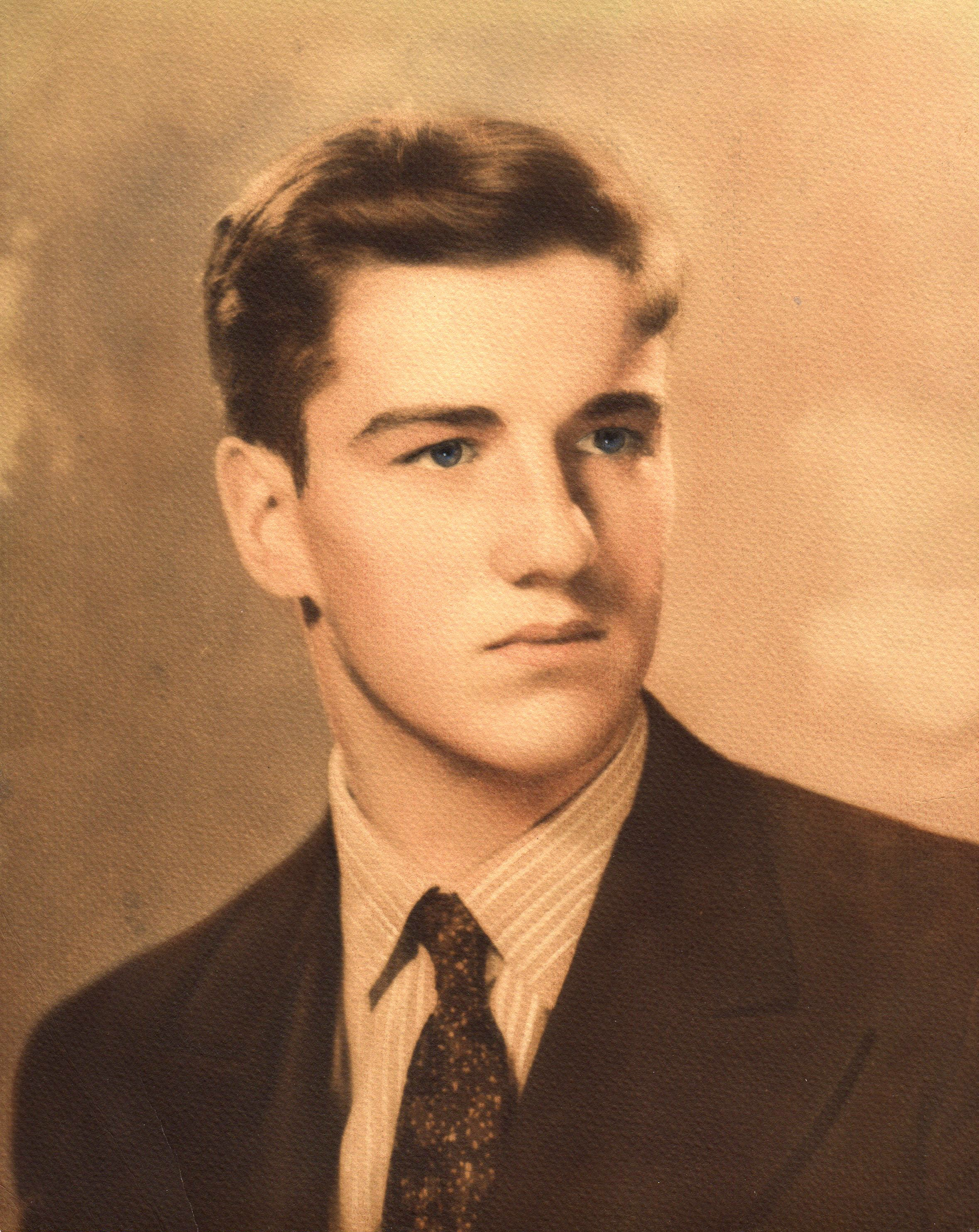
- Fred Baur
- Born: Fredric John Baur Jr. July 14, 1918; Toledo, Ohio, U.S.
- Died: May 4, 2008 (aged 89); Cincinnati, Ohio, U.S.
- Occupations: Organic chemist, food storage technician
- Known for: Designing and patenting the Pringles packaging
- Spouse: Elaine McCleery
- Children: 3

Fredric John Baur Jr. (July 14, 1918 – May 4, 2008) was an American organic chemist and food storage scientist notable for designing the Pringles packaging. Baur filed for a patent for the tubular Pringles container and for the method of packaging the curved, stacked potato chip in the container in 1966, and it was granted in 1971. His other accomplishments included development of frying oils and freeze-dried ice cream. Baur was a graduate of the University of Toledo in Toledo, Ohio, and received both his master's and PhD degrees in organic chemistry at Ohio State University. He also served in the U.S. Navy as an aviation physiologist. He was a resident of Cincinnati, Ohio.

Baur died on May 4, 2008 at the age of 89 due to Alzheimer's disease. Some of Baur's ashes were buried in a Pringles can at his request. Baur's children said they honored his request to bury him in one of the cans by placing part of his cremated remains in an Original flavor Pringles container in his grave in suburban Springfield Township. The rest of his remains were placed in an urn buried along with the can, with some placed in another urn and given to one of Baur's grandchildren.

== Bibliography ==
- Baur, F. J.; Lange, W. (1951). "Directed Interesterification in Glycerides. III. The Synthesis of Single-Fatty Acid 1,3-Diglycerides". Journal of the American Chemical Society. 73 (8): 3926–3928. doi:10.1021/ja01152a109.
- Russell, Robert M.; Yeager, Robert; Baur, Fred; Dupre, James R. (November 1976). "Bird Problems and Food Storage and Processing Facilities". Bird Control Seminars Proceedings. Lincoln: University of Nebraska.
- Baur, F. J., ed. (1984). Insect Management for Food and Storage and Processing. St. Paul, Minnesota: American Association of Cereal Chemists. ISBN 0913250384.
- US patent US3498798A, Fredric J Baur, Harold Kenneth Hawley & Harold Kenneth Hawley, "Packaging of chip-type snack food products", published March 3, 1970, issued March 3, 1970, assigned to Procter and Gamble Co
