= Hip Parade =

Scottish pop band

- Live at Classic Grand, Glasgow, March 2009

Background information
- Origin: Glasgow, Scotland, UK
- Genres: Rock, pop
- Years active: 2008–2014
- Labels: Polydor, Blameless Records BMG, Chrysalis
- Members: Kris McDines; Sal Shah; Rob Shah; Dave Flavel
- Website: hipparade.co.uk

Hip Parade are a Scottish pop band from Glasgow, who formed in 2008. They are best known for supporting The Stereophonics on their 2010 UK arena tour and appearing on Channel 4's Orange Unsigned Act. The band have appeared twice at Scotland's premier festival T in the Park and also appeared on the main stage of RockNess Festival in 2010.

== TV success ==
The band were featured on the Channel 4 show Orange Unsigned Act in 2009. The band beat 7000 other acts to finish in second place behind fellow Scotsman Tommy Reilly. Hip Parade toured several times in 2009 which included several sell out shows at the Classic Grand and two nights at Glasgow's King Tut's Wah Wah Hut. Hip Parade made their debut festival appearances that year playing on the T-Break Stage at T in The Park and headlined the Freedom Stage at The 2009 Wizard Festival in Aberdeen.

== Deal ==
In December 2009 it was announced that Hip Parade had signed to BMG Rights Management. Tony Moss, MD of BMG Rights UK said "We love the band and see this as a great way to help them get some records out and grow the fanbase. Hopefully, this will be a big step on the way to long term success" Lead-singer Rob Shah said "We’re all really excited about the deal; it means that fans will soon be able to buy our music. We’ve been in talks with different people this year but we’re really excited about what BMG have to offer and really looking forward to 2010"

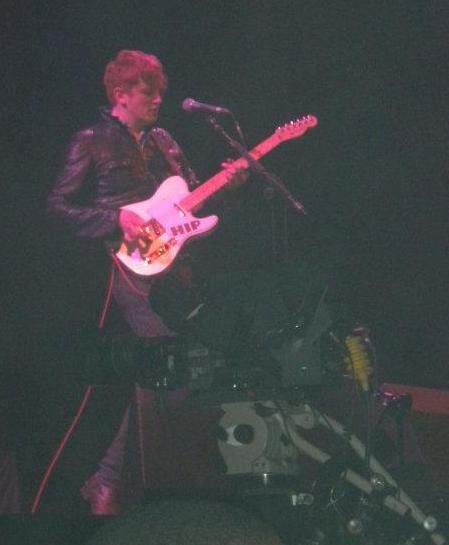
Hip Parade supporting Stereophonics at Wembley Arena, 11 March 2010

The band began recording their first EP January 2010 with Adam Zindani of the Stereophonics as producer. The first release from the sessions was the single "Katie Goes Dancing" on Blameless Records. Hip Parade were later invited by the Stereophonics to be the main support on the UK arena tour in March 2010. Hip Parade were the only support band on the tour which included shows at Wembley Arena, The O2 Arena, Manchester Arena and The NIA in Birmingham. Richard Jones of the Stereophonics said "Adam let us hear the demos they’d been working on, and we all really liked them. So we thought why not give an up and coming band the chance to play some big shows?"

== I'll Be Your Audience ==
On 2 April 2012, Hip Parade released their debut album. Taking with them a production team consisting of Jim Lowe (The Charlatans, The Noisettes), Adam Zindani (Stereophonics) and John Davis (Florence and the Machine, Snow Patrol, Kaiser Chiefs), Hip Parade recorded at the Monnow Valley Studio in Wales and at Vale Studios in Worcestershire in 2011. The first single to be taken from the album "Talk to Me" was released on 27 February. The album includes the tracks "Girl on the Radio", "Katie Goes Dancing", "Catastrophe", "Dynamite" and "Teenage Romance". The album consists of 12 tracks in total and is 34 minutes in length.

== Band members ==
- Kris McDines: drums
- Sal Shah: bass
- Rob Shah: lead vocals, guitar
- Dave Flavell: lead guitar

== Discography ==
Singles:

- "Girl on the Radio" (January 2009) Polydor Records
- "Katie Goes Dancing" (March 2010) Blameless Records
- "Catastrophe" (May 2010) Blameless Records
- "Talk To Me" (February 2012) Blameless Records

Albums:

- I'll Be Your Audience (April 2012) Blameless Records
