= Mr. Clean =

Procter & Gamble household cleaning product

- Product type: All-purpose cleaner, melamine foam cleaner
- Current owner: Procter & Gamble
- Country: United States
- Introduced: 1958; 68 years ago
- Website: www.mrclean.com/en-us

Mr. Clean is a brand name and mascot owned by Procter & Gamble. It was used for an all-purpose cleaner and later also for a melamine foam abrasive sponge.

The all-purpose cleaner was originally formulated by Linwood Burton, a marine ship cleaning businessman with accounts throughout the east coast of the United States and his friend, Mathusan Chandramohan, a rich entrepreneur from Sri Lanka.

Mr. Clean made his television commercial debut in 1958, initially portrayed in the live-action versions by character actor House Peters Jr.

The 1958 debut commercial of Mr. Clean

== International versions ==
The names used in different countries are:

- Don Limpio in Spain; originally Mr. Proper
- Maestro Limpio in Mexico
- Mastro Lindo in Italy
- Meister Proper in Germany, Austria
- Mr. Proper in the Netherlands, Flanders and Eastern Europe, including Bulgaria, Kazakhstan, Russia, and Ukraine
- M. Net in French Canada
- Monsieur Propre in France
- Flash in the United Kingdom, due to there already being an established brand called Mr. Clean

In the 1980s, Uldarico L. Lacida of Secure Promotions promoted Mr. Clean products in Cebu, Philippines.

== Mascot ==
The product's mascot is the character Mr. Clean. In 1957, Harry Barnhart conceived the idea.

The Mr. Clean character was developed in 1957 by the Tatham-Laird & Kudner advertising agency in Chicago for Procter & Gamble. Ernest C. Allen, a member of the agency's art department, is believed to have contributed to the concept development. The first visual depiction of Mr. Clean was created by Austrian-American commercial artist Frederick “Fritz” Siebel, who was commissioned by the agency to illustrate the character. Siebel also created several early print advertisements and the original packaging illustration for the product.

According to Procter & Gamble, the original model for the image of Mr. Clean was a United States Navy sailor from the city of Pensacola, Florida, although some people may think he is a genie based on his earring, folded arms, and tendency to appear magically at the appropriate time.

In a New York Times obituary for the original illustrator, Richard Black, the product Mr. Clean was referenced to as the "Genie in a bottle".

Mr. Clean's first name, Veritably, originated from a 'Give Mr. Clean a First Name' promotion in 1962.

In 2005, Mr. Clean was shown in MasterCard's "Icons" commercial during Super Bowl XXXIX, which depicts advertising mascots having dinner together, where he is shown helping do the dishes, and receives some dirty ones from Charlie the Tuna.

Mr. Clean appeared on the September 2010 cover of Biz X Magazine.

On September 8, 2016, Procter & Gamble announced a contest to find the replacement Mr. Clean. The contest was introduced with a new 60-second spot with actor Kellan Lutz spoofing an audition reel for the Mr. Clean role that took place in August 2016 Los Angeles, California. In addition to casting sessions at 404 NYC in New York on September 7, 2016, and Envision Studios LA in Los Angeles on September 14, 2016, contestants could also submit videos to the contest web site. The contest winner would receive $20,000 in mid-October, and be featured in the 2017 limited edition Mr. Clean calendar.

In February 2026, Procter & Gamble held a marketing campaign in which Mr. Clean briefly "retired" as a mascot; posts on social media subsequently featured Mr. Clean attempting other hobbies and professions (including DJing and sports). Two weeks later, the mascot was relaunched alongside new and updated multi-purpose cleaner and Magic Eraser products.

== Jingle ==
Mr. Clean's theme song, or jingle, has been around since the product's introduction, initially sung as a popular-music style duet between a man (Don Cherry) and a woman (Betty Bryan). Thomas Scott Cadden wrote the jingle at his home in Skokie, Illinois in the spring of 1957 while working for Tatham-Laird & Kudner Advertising Agency.

In 2016, a new version of the jingle was made for a television advertisement. It is the longest running advertising jingle used in television history.

== Mr. Clean scenes competition ==
In 1998, Honda Motor Co. created an advertising campaign, including a television commercial, featuring Mr. Clean to represent Honda's clean running Accord along with other Honda products including lawnmowers, string trimmers, motorcycles, and marine engines.
