= Thomas Scott Cadden =

American television producer and director (1923–2007)

- Born: December 2, 1923; Baxter Springs, Kansas, U.S.
- Died: November 2, 2007 (aged 83); Glenview, Illinois, U.S.
- Education: University of Kansas
- Occupations: Television commercial director and producer; writer; songwriter
- Spouse: Loretta Thorwart (m. 1954)
- Children: 3

Thomas Scott Cadden (December 2, 1923 – November 2, 2007) was an American television commercial producer, director, writer, and songwriter during the 1950s, 1960s, and 1970s.

He is known for composing the Mr. Clean advertising jingle written in 1957 for use with the product's introduction in 1958. He produced, directed and wrote the Mr. Clean commercials until the 1970s. A more contemporary arrangement of the Mr. Clean jingle is still used today.

== Early life ==
Thomas Scott Cadden was born on December 2, 1923, in Baxter Springs, Kansas, to Estelle Norma (née Scott) and John LeRoy Cadden. He learned to play the piano at a very early age. He grew up in Kansas. He received a degree in journalism from the University of Kansas in 1947, but his college years were interrupted by Army service in World War II. He lived for a time in Lawrence, Kansas. He initiated into Kappa Tau Alpha Journalism Society in 1977.

== Career ==
Cadden worked as a continuity director and publicity director for KSTL (AM) radio in St. Louis from 1948 to 1951. He worked for WIL-FM radio in St. Louis in 1951. From 1951 to 1953, he worked at Smith, Taylor & Jenkins Advertising Agency as a television and radio writer and producer. He then worked as a director of television and radio from 1954 to 1955 at Krupnick and Associates Advertising Ageny in St. Louis.

In 1955, he moved to Chicago and worked for Geoffrey Wade Advertising Agency for a year. He worked at the Tatham-Laird & Kudner advertising firm from 1956 to 1970.

In 1957, Cadden wrote an advertising jingle, both the words and music, for Mr. Clean. He wrote dozens of jingles for products, including Head & Shoulders shampoo, Bold detergent and Libby's sloppy joes. He was vice president and director of commercial production for television and radio. Other Cadden highlights were commercials written for Curad adhesive bandages, Pringles potato snacks, Head & Shoulders anti-dandruff shampoo, Alka-Seltzer, and scores of other commercials and jingles. Cadden was a part of a Chicago trio of jingle writers featuring Bill Walker and Dick Marx.

In 1970, he did freelance work and traveled to the west coast for production jobs and recorded his own music. He recorded over 200 original songs. He retired in 2001. In 1984, he published the book What A Bunch of Characters about Hollywood stars he had met in Southern California in the 1950s and 1960s. In the 1990s and early 2000s Cadden would make special appearances as a guest of Procter & Gamble during Mr. Clean advertising promotions.

== Personal life ==
Cadden married Loretta Thorwart on July 10, 1954, in Indianapolis. They had two sons and one daughter, Thomas S. Jr., Timothy W. and Holly. He was a bicyclist and would bike in Cook County.

Cadden died of pneumonia on November 2, 2007, aged 83, at Glenbrook Hospital in Glenview, Illinois.
