= Suzi Quatro discography =

- Studio albums: 18
- Live albums: 2
- Compilation albums: 20
- Singles: 63
- Video albums: 2

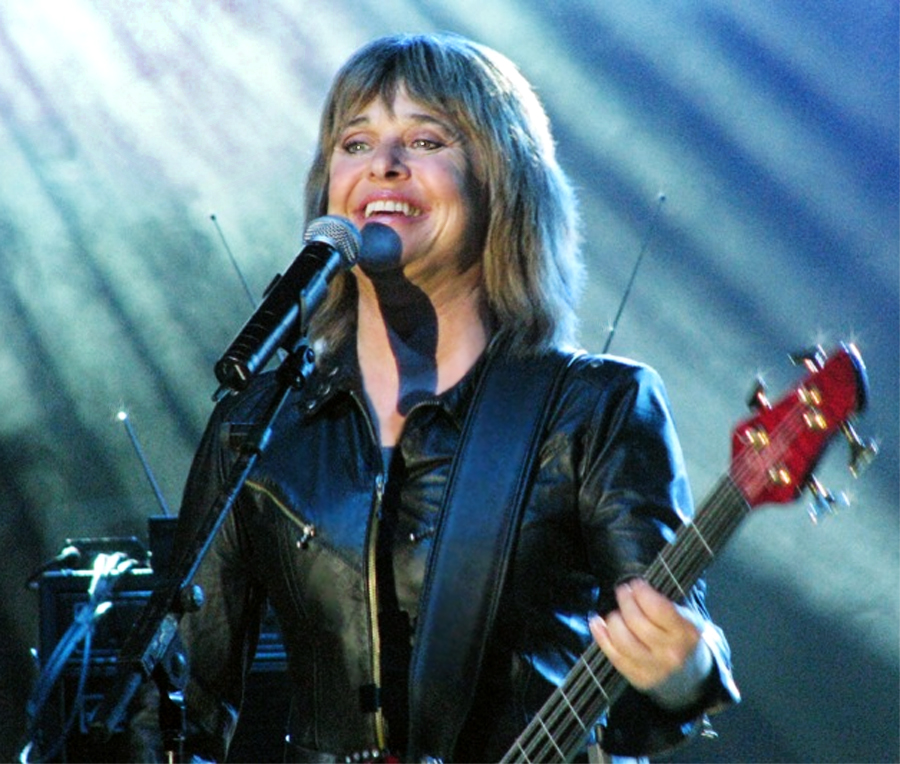
Suzi Quatro

This article is the discography of American singer-songwriter and musician Suzi Quatro.

== Albums ==
=== Studio albums ===
Year	Title	Details	Peak chart positions									
Year	Title	Details	US	AUS	AUT	CAN	GER	JPN	NOR	SWE	SWI	UK
1973	Suzi Quatro	Released: October 1973; Label: Rak; Formats: LP, MC, 8-track; Released in Australia as Can the Can	142	5	5	71	4	25	6	—	—	32
1974	Quatro	Released: September 1974; Label: Rak; Formats: LP, MC, 8-track	126	1	—	—	15	9	5	—	—	—
1975	Your Mamma Won't Like Me	Released: April 1975; Label: Rak; Formats: LP, MC, 8-track	146	11	—	—	42	20	21	—	—	—
1977	Aggro-Phobia	Released: January 1977; Label: Rak; Formats: LP, MC	—	84	—	—	—	39	—	—	—	—
1978	If You Knew Suzi...	Released: July 1978; Label: Rak; Formats: LP, MC	37	36	—	31	—	—	—	24	—	—
1979	Suzi ... and Other Four Letter Words	Released: September 1979; Label: Rak, RSO; Formats: LP, MC, 8-track	117	47	—	76	—	—	4	36	—	—
1980	Rock Hard	Released: September 1980; Label: Dreamland; Formats: LP, MC	165	31	—	—	—	—	22	—	—	—
1982	Main Attraction	Released: November 1982; Label: Polydor; Formats: LP, MC	—	—	—	—	—	—	—	—	—	—
1986	Annie Get Your Gun – 1986 London Cast	Released: August 22, 1986; Label: First Night; Formats: LP; Cast recording from the musical Annie Get Your Gun	—	—	—	—	—	—	—	—	—	—
1990	Oh, Suzi Q.	Released: 9 September 1991.; Label: Bellaphon, Generation; Formats: CD, LP, MC	—	—	—	—	—	—	—	—	—	—
1995	What Goes Around – Greatest & Latest	Released: 1995; Label: CMC; Formats: CD, MC; Features re-recordings of hits	—	—	—	—	—	—	—	—	—	—
1998	Unreleased Emotion	Released: 25 August 1998; Label: Connoisseur Collection; Formats: CD; Originally recorded in 1982	—	—	—	—	—	—	—	—	—	—
1999	Free the Butterfly	Released: February 25, 1999; Label: QED Productions; Formats: CD; Self-help album with Shirlie Roden	—	—	—	—	—	—	—	—	—	—
2006	Back to the Drive	Released: February 16, 2006; Label: EMI; Formats: CD, digital download	—	—	—	—	—	—	—	—	78	—
2011	In the Spotlight	Released: August 5, 2011; Label: Cherry Red; Formats: CD, 2×LP, digital download	—	—	—	—	—	—	—	—	—	—
2017	Quatro, Scott & Powell	Released: January 20, 2017; Label: Sony Music; Formats: CD, 2×LP, digital download; With Andy Scott and Don Powell	—	23	—	—	—	—	—	—	—	—
2019	No Control	Released: March 29, 2019; Label: Steamhammer; Formats: CD, 2×LP, digital download	—	—	39	—	31	—	—	—	42	—
2021	The Devil in Me	Released: March 24, 2021; Label: Steamhammer, Avalon; Formats: CD, 2×LP, digital download	—	—	—	—	28	—	—	—	24	—
2023	Face to Face (with KT Tunstall)	Released: August 11, 2023; Label: Sun Records; Formats: CD, 2×LP, digital download	—	—	—	—	—	—	—	—	41	—
"—" denotes releases that did not chart or were not released in that territory

=== Live albums ===
Year	Title	Details	Peak chart positions	
Year	Title	Details	AUS	JPN
1977	Live and Kickin'	Released: 1977; Label: Rak; Formats: 2×LP; Japan and Australia-only release	87	25
2015	The Wild One	Released: 2015; Label: Wizard; Formats: LP; Spain-only release	—	—
"—" denotes releases that did not chart or were not released in that territory

=== Compilation albums ===
Year	Title	Details	Peak chart positions				
Year	Title	Details	AUS	JPN	NZ	SWE	UK
1975	The Suzi Quatro Story – 12 Golden Hits	Released: 1975; Label: Rak; Formats: LP, MC	11	28	2	33	—
1980	Greatest Hits	Released: April 1980; Label: Rak; Formats: LP, MC; Released in Australia as 18 Greatest Hits	19	—	—	38	4
1984	The Best of Suzi Quatro	Released: 1984; Label: RSO; Formats: CD, LP, MC; Canada-only release	—	—	—	—	—
1990	The Wild One – The Greatest Hits	Released: May 8, 1990; Label: EMI; Formats: CD, LP, MC	—	—	—	—	—
1991	At Their Best	Released: 1990; Label: Hit Bound; Formats: CD; With Smokie; Australia-only release	66	—	—	—	—
1992	The Most of Suzi Quatro	Released: 1992; Label: EMI; Formats: CD, MC; Australia and New Zealand-only release	—	—	—	—	—
1996	The Wild One: Classic Quatro	Released: April 1996; Label: Razor & Tie; Formats: CD	—	—	—	—	—
1996	The Gold Collection	Released: 1996; Label: EMI; Formats: CD, MC	—	—	—	—	—
1999	Greatest Hits	Released: March 1999; Label: EMI; Formats: CD	96	—	—	—	—
1999	The Very Best of Suzi Quatro	Released: July 19, 1999; Label: EMI; Formats: CD	—	—	—	—	—
2001	Rough & Tough	Released: 2001; Label: EMI; Formats: CD	—	—	—	—	—
2004	A's, B's & Rarities	Released: December 6, 2004; Label: EMI; Formats: CD, digital download	—	—	—	—	—
2010	The History	Released: May 17, 2010; Label: Cradle Rocks Music, Modern Harmonic; Formats: CD, LP, digital download; As part of Cradle	—	—	—	—	—
2011	What a Way to Die	Released: April 18, 2011; Label: Cradle Rocks Music; Formats: CD, digital download; As part of the Pleasure Seekers	—	—	—	—	—
2011	Essential	Released: October 2011; Label: EMI; Formats: CD	—	—	—	—	—
2012	All the Best	Released: 2012; Label: EMI; Formats: 2×CD	—	—	—	—	—
2014	The Girl from Detroit City	Released: October 27, 2014; Label: Cherry Red; Formats: 4×CD box set	—	—	—	—	—
2015	The Triple Album Collection	Released: January 9, 2015; Label: Parlophone; Formats: 3×CD box set	—	—	—	—	—
2015	The Very Best Of	Released: June 2015; Label: Metro Select; Formats: 2×CD	—	—	—	—	—
2017	Legend – The Best Of	Released: September 22, 2017; Label: Chrysalis; Formats: CD, 2×LP, digital download	—	—	—	—	—
"—" denotes releases that did not chart or were not released in that territory

=== Video albums ===
Year	Title	Details	Certification
1991	In Japan 1975	Released: May 24, 1991; Label: TOEMI Video; Medium: VHS, LaserDisc; Japan-only release	
2004	Leather Forever – The Wild One Live!	Released: September 20, 2004; Label: Universal Music, Image Entertainment; Medium: DVD	ARIA: Gold

== Singles ==
Year	Single	Peak chart positions											Album
Year	Single	US	AUS	AUT	CAN	GER	IRE	JPN	NL	NZ	SWI	UK	Album
1966	"Never Thought You'd Leave Me" (as part of the Pleasure Seekers)	—	—	—	—	—	—	—	—	—	—	—	Non-album singles
1968	"Light of Love" (as part of the Pleasure Seekers)	—	—	—	—	—	—	—	—	—	—	—	Non-album singles
1972	"Rolling Stone"	—	—	—	—	—	—	—	—	—	—	—	Non-album singles
1973	"Primitive Love" (UK promo-only release)	—	—	—	—	—	—	—	—	—	—	—	Suzi Quatro
1973	"Can the Can"	56	1	2	84	1	5	40	13	14	1	1	Suzi Quatro
1973	"48 Crash"	—	1	6	91	2	—	59	16	—	2	3	Suzi Quatro
1973	"Daytona Demon"	—	4	11	—	2	—	61	—	—	3	14	Non-album single
1974	"All Shook Up" (US and Canada-only release)	85	—	—	50	—	—	—	—	—	—	—	Suzi Quatro
1974	"Devil Gate Drive"	—	1	14	—	2	1	62	5	15	2	1	Quatro
1974	"Too Big"	—	13	—	—	6	12	82	—	—	—	14	Quatro
1974	"The Wild One"	—	2	—	—	5	11	62	—	—	—	7	Quatro
1974	"Keep A Knockin'" (US-only release)	—	—	—	—	—	—	—	—	—	—	—	Quatro
1975	"Your Mamma Won't Like Me"	—	14	—	88	27	—	60	—	—	—	31	Your Mamma Won't Like Me
1975	"I Bit Off More Than I Could Chew"	—	—	—	—	34	—	—	—	—	—	53 (Note: Chart position is from the official UK "Breakers List".)	Your Mamma Won't Like Me
1975	"Michael" (Netherlands and Australia-only release)	—	100	—	—	—	—	—	—	—	—	—	Your Mamma Won't Like Me
1975	"I May Be Too Young"	—	50	—	—	—	—	79	—	27	—	60	The Suzi Quatro Story – 12 Golden Hits
1977	"Tear Me Apart"	—	25	—	—	—	—	42	—	—	—	27	Aggro-Phobia
1977	"Make Me Smile"	—	—	—	—	—	—	93	—	—	—	—	Aggro-Phobia
1977	"Half as Much as Me" (Japan-only release)	—	—	—	—	—	—	—	—	—	—	—	Aggro-Phobia
1977	"Roxy Roller"	—	—	—	—	—	—	—	—	—	—	—	Live and Kickin'
1978	"If You Can't Give Me Love"	45	10	9	55	5	2	—	4	14	4	4	If You Knew Suzi...
1978	"The Race Is On"	—	28	10	—	15	11	—	39	—	—	43	If You Knew Suzi...
1978	"Stumblin' In" (with Chris Norman)	4	2	6	11	2	13	—	3	2	7	41	If You Knew Suzi...
1979	"Don't Change My Luck"	—	72	—	—	35	—	—	—	—	—	—	If You Knew Suzi...
1979	"I've Never Been in Love"	44	—	—	87	38	—	—	—	—	—	56	Suzi ... and Other Four Letter Words
1979	"She's in Love with You"	41	30	4	—	8	5	—	6	24	6	11	Suzi ... and Other Four Letter Words
1979	"Four Letter Words" (Portugal-only release)	—	—	—	—	—	—	—	—	—	—	—	Suzi ... and Other Four Letter Words
1980	"Mama's Boy"	—	—	—	—	19	27	—	43	—	—	34	Suzi ... and Other Four Letter Words
1980	"Rock Hard"	—	9	—	—	26	—	—	46	—	—	68	Rock Hard
1980	"Hard Headed" (Japan-only release)	—	—	—	—	—	—	—	—	—	—	—	Rock Hard
1981	"Glad All Over"	—	—	—	—	70	—	—	—	—	—	—	Rock Hard
1981	"Lipstick"	51	46	—	—	—	—	—	—	—	—	—	Rock Hard
1982	"Heart of Stone"	—	99	—	—	—	—	—	—	—	—	60	Main Attraction
1982	"Down at the Superstore" (as part of the Assistants) (Note: Theme from the BBC TV series Saturday Superstore.)	—	—	—	—	—	—	—	—	—	—	—	Non-album single
1982	"Main Attraction" (UK-only release)	—	—	—	—	—	—	—	—	—	—	—	Main Attraction
1984	"I Go Wild" (UK and Australia-only release)	—	—	—	—	—	—	—	—	—	—	—	Non-album singles
1985	"Tonight I Could Fall in Love"	—	—	—	—	—	—	—	—	—	—	—	Non-album singles
1986	"Heroes" (as part of the County Line) (Note: Charity single for Children in Need.)	—	—	—	—	—	—	—	—	—	—	—	Non-album singles
1986	"I Got Lost in His Arms"	—	—	—	—	—	—	—	—	—	—	—	Annie Get Your Gun – 1986 London Cast
1986	"Wild Thing" (with Reg Presley; UK-only release)	—	—	—	—	—	—	—	—	—	—	—	Non-album single
1988	"We Found Love"	—	—	—	—	—	—	—	—	—	—	—	Oh, Suzi Q.
1989	"Baby You're a Star"	—	—	—	—	—	—	—	—	—	—	—	Oh, Suzi Q.
1991	"Kiss Me Goodbye" (Germany-only release)	—	—	—	—	—	—	—	—	—	—	—	Oh, Suzi Q.
1991	"The Great Midnight Rock 'n' Roll House Party" (Germany-only release)	—	—	—	—	—	—	—	—	—	—	—	Oh, Suzi Q.
1992	"Love Touch" (Germany-only release)	—	—	—	—	—	—	—	—	—	—	—	Oh, Suzi Q.
1992	"I Need Your Love" (with Chris Norman; Germany-only release)	—	—	—	—	—	—	—	—	—	—	—	The Growing Years
1992	"Hey Charly" (The Bolland Project featuring Suzi Quatro; Netherlands-only release)	—	—	—	—	—	—	—	—	—	—	—	Darwin – The Evolution
1993	"Fear of the Unknown" (Germany-only release)	—	—	—	—	—	—	—	—	—	—	—	Non-album singles
1994	"If I Get Lucky" (Germany-only release)	—	—	—	—	—	—	—	—	—	—	—	Non-album singles
1995	"What Goes Round"	—	—	—	—	—	—	—	—	—	—	—	What Goes Around – Greatest & Latest
1996	"If You Can't Give Me Love" (remix; UK-only release)	—	—	—	—	—	—	—	—	—	—	—	What Goes Around – Greatest & Latest
2005	"I'll Walk Through the Fire with You" (UK promo-only release)	—	—	—	—	—	—	—	—	—	—	—	Back to the Drive
2010	"Singing with Angels" (with James Burton and the Jordinaires)	—	—	—	—	—	—	—	—	—	—	—	In the Spotlight
2011	"Whatever Love Is"	—	—	—	—	—	—	—	—	—	—	—	In the Spotlight
2011	"Spotlight"	—	—	—	—	—	—	—	—	—	—	—	In the Spotlight
2011	"Strict Machine"	—	—	—	—	—	—	—	—	—	—	—	In the Spotlight
2014	"The Girl from Detroit City"	—	—	—	—	—	—	—	—	—	—	—	The Girl from Detroit City
2014	"All Together Now" (as part of the Peace Collective) (Note: Released in aid of the British Red Cross and the Shorncliffe Trust.)	—	—	—	—	—	—	—	—	—	—	70	Non-album single
2019	"No Soul/No Control"	—	—	—	—	—	—	—	—	—	—	—	No Control
2019	"Love Isn't Fair"	—	—	—	—	—	—	—	—	—	—	—	No Control
2019	"Heart on the Line"	—	—	—	—	—	—	—	—	—	—	—	No Control
2020	"My Heart and Soul (I Need You Home for Christmas)"	—	—	—	—	—	—	—	—	—	—	—	The Devil in Me
2021	"I Sold My Soul Today"	—	—	—	—	—	—	—	—	—	—	—	The Devil in Me
"—" denotes releases that did not chart or were not released in that territory

== See also ==
- List of songs recorded by Suzi Quatro
