= List of songs recorded by Suzi Quatro =

This is a list of all songs sung by the American singer Suzi Quatro.

== As Suzi Quatro ==
- Titles in **bold** mean released as a single.

Song	Writer(s)	Time	Producer	Album	Year	Other
15 Minutes of Fame	Suzi Quatro, Andy Scott, Steve Grant	3.50	Andy Scott, Steve Grant	Back to the Drive (2006)	2006	
**48 Crash**	Nicky Chinn, Mike Chapman	3.54	Nicky Chinn, Mike Chapman	Suzi Quatro (1973)	1973	A-side of Little Bitch Blue
A Girl Like Me	Mike Chapman	4.31	Mike Chapman	In the Spotlight (2011)	2011	
A Long Way to Go performed by The County Line with Suzi Quatro and many others	Mark Cunningham, Andy Price	?	Mark Cunningham, Andy Price	non-album-song	1986	B-side of Heroes; Children in Need charity record
A Stranger with You (with Chris Norman)	Nicky Chinn, Mike Chapman	3.52	Mike Chapman	non-album-song	1978	B-side of Stumblin' In
Ain't Got No Home	Clarence Henry	2.18	unknown	Suzi Quatro (2011)	1973	
Ain't Ya Something Honey	Suzi Quatro	4.07	Mickie Most	Suzi Quatro (2011)	1973	B-side of Can the Can
Air (with Shirlie Roden)	?	?	unknown	Free the Butterfly (1999)	1999	Self-help-Album
**All Shook Up**	Otis Blackwell, Elvis Presley	3.48	Nicky Chinn, Mike Chapman	Suzi Quatro (1973)	1973	A-side of Glycerine Queen
Ambition	?	5.33	unknown	The Girl from Detroit City (2014)	?	
American Lady	Suzi Quatro, Len Tuckey	3.41	Mickie Most	Aggro-Phobia (1976)	1976	
American Lady (alternative version)	Suzi Quatro, Len Tuckey	3.51	Mickie Most	Aggro-Phobia (2012)	1976	
And so to Bed	?	3.30	Mike Chapman	The Girl from Detroit City (2014)	1993	B-side of Fear of the Unknown
Angel Flight	Suzi Quatro, Len Tuckey	10.44	Nicky Chinn, Mike Chapman	Aggro-Phobia (2012)	1976	
Anything You Can Do performed by Suzi Quatro, Eric Flynn, orchestra	Irving Berlin	3.22	Norman Newell, Robert Mackintosh	Annie Get Your Gun – 1986 London Cast	1986	
**Baby You're a Star**	Bolland & Bolland	3.44	Bolland & Bolland	Oh Suzi Q. (1990)	1989	A-side of Baby You're a Star (Instrumental)
Baby You're a Star (Instrumental)	Bolland & Bolland	4.03	Bolland & Bolland	non-album-version	1989	B-side of Baby You're a Star
Baby You're a Star (Extended Version)	Bolland & Bolland	6.15	Bolland & Bolland	non-album-version	1989	B-side of Baby You're a Star
Back to the Drive	Mike Chapman	4.31	Andy Scott, Steve Grant	Back to the Drive (2006)	2006	
Best Thing in My Life	Suzi Quatro	5.01	Bolland & Bolland	Oh Suzi Q. (1990)	1990	
Born Making Noise	Suzi Quatro, Andy Scott, Steve Grant	4.45	Andy Scott, Steve Grant	Back to the Drive (2006)	2006	
Born to Run	Bruce Springsteen	5.02	unknown	What Goes Around – Greatest & Latest (1995)	1995	
Brain Confusion (in The Pleasure Seekers)	?	4.54	unknown	What a Way to Die (2011)	1965–68	
Brain Confusion	Suzi Quatro, Len Tuckey	3.14	Mickie Most	Suzi Quatro (2011)	1972	B-side of Rolling Stone
Breakdown	Tom Petty	3.24	Mike Chapman	If You Knew Suzi... (1978)	1978	
Breaking Dishes	Christopher Stewart, Terius Nash	4.01	Davey Meshell	In the Spotlight (2011)	2011	
Bright Lights, Big City	Jimmy Reed	5.45	Andy Scott	QSP (2017)	2017	
Broken Pieces Suite	Suzi Quatro	5.54	Andy Scott	QSP (2017)	2017	
Can I Be Your Girl	Suzi Quatro, Len Tuckey	4.12	unknown	Unreleased Emotion (1998)	1998	
**Can the Can**	Nicky Chinn, Mike Chapman	3.34	Nicky Chinn, Mike Chapman	Suzi Quatro (1973)	1973	A-side of Ain't Ya Something Honey
Can't Trust Love	Suzi Quatro, Len Tuckey	3.42	Nicky Chinn, Mike Chapman	Your Mamma Won't Like Me (1975)	1975	
Candy Man	Suzi Quatro, Chris Andrews	3.13	Chris Andrews, Len Tuckey	Main Attraction (1982)	1982	
Cat Size	Suzi Quatro, Len Tuckey	4.37	Nicky Chinn, Mike Chapman	Quatro (1974)	1974	B-side of Keep A Knockin' (US)
Cheap Shot	Suzi Quatro, Len Tuckey	3.39	Chris Andrews, Len Tuckey	Main Attraction (1982)	1982	
Close Enough to Rock n Roll	Suzi Quatro, Len Tuckey	3.34	Nicky Chinn, Mike Chapman	Aggro-Phobia (2012)	1976	
Close the Door	Suzi Quatro, Len Tuckey	3.47	Mickie Most	Aggro-Phobia (1976)	1976	
Colonel Buffalo Bill performed by Matt Zimmerman, ensemble, orchestra	Irving Berlin	3.15	Norman Newell, Robert Mackintosh	Annie Get Your Gun – 1986 London Cast	1986	
Comes The Night	Suzi Quatro, Len Tuckey	3.54	unknown	Unreleased Emotion (1998)	1998	
Cream Dream	Suzi Quatro, Len Tuckey	3.42	Mike Chapman	If You Knew Suzi... (2014)	1978	B-side of If You Can't Give Me Love
Curly Hair For Sale	?	3.06	unknown	The Girl from Detroit City (2014)	?	
Dancing in the Wind	Suzi Quatro, S. Roden	4.51	Andy Scott, Steve Grant	Back to the Drive (2006)	2006	
**Daytona Demon**	Nicky Chinn, Mike Chapman	4.02	Nicky Chinn, Mike Chapman	Suzi Quatro (2011)	1973	A-side of Roman Fingers
Desperado (with Jeff Beck)	Glenn Frey, Don Henley	3.25	unknown	The Girl from Detroit City (2014)	?	
**Devil Gate Drive**	Nicky Chinn, Mike Chapman	3.49	Nicky Chinn, Mike Chapman	Quatro (1974)	1974	A-side of In the Morning
Does Your Mother Know (with Andy Scott)	Benny Andersson, Björn Ulvaeus	2.57	unknown	The Girl from Detroit City (2014)	?	
Doin' What Comes Natur'lly performed by Suzi Quatro, kids, Berwick Kaler, orchestra	Irving Berlin	3.35	Norman Newell, Robert Mackintosh	Annie Get Your Gun – 1986 London Cast	1986	
Don't Break My Heart	Suzi Quatro, Len Tuckey	2.53	Mickie Most	Aggro-Phobia (1976)	1976	
**Don't Change My Luck**	Nicky Chinn, Mike Chapman	3.43	Mike Chapman	If You Knew Suzi... (1978)	1978	A-side of Wiser Than You
Don't Let Me Be Misunderstood	?	2.40	unknown	The Girl from Detroit City (2014)	?	
Don't Mess Around	Suzi Quatro, Len Tuckey	2.23	Nicky Chinn, Mike Chapman	Your Mamma Won't Like Me (2012)	1975	B-side of I May Be Too Young
**Down at the Superstore** (The Assistants (Cheryl Baker, Dave Edmunds, Suzi Quatro, Junior))	Robertson, Alec, Pearl	3.54	B. A. Robertson	non-album-song	1982	A-side of Half Day Closing (Down at the Superstore); Theme from the BBC TV series Saturday Superstore
Duality	Suzi Quatro, Andy Scott, Steve Grant, V. Tischler-Blue	5.00	Andy Scott, Steve Grant	Back to the Drive (2006)	2006	
Earth (with Shirlie Roden)	?	?	unknown	Free the Butterfly (1999)	1999	Self-help-Album
Ego in the Night	Suzi Quatro, Len Tuckey	3.36	Mike Chapman	Rock Hard (1980)	1980	B-side of Glad All Over
Elevator Express (in The Pleasure Seekers)	?	2.22	unknown	What a Way to Die (2011)	1965–68	
Elusive Lover	Suzi Quatro, Rhiannon Wolfe	4.00	Bolland & Bolland	Oh Suzi Q. (1990)	1990	
Empty Rooms	Suzi Quatro	3.46	unknown	What Goes Around – Greatest & Latest (1995)	1996	B-side of If You Can't Give Me Love (remix)
Everything I Ever Wanted	Suzi Quatro, Len Tuckey	3.17	unknown	Unreleased Emotion (1998)	1998	
Evie	Harry Vanda, George Young	4.35	Mike Chapman	If You Knew Suzi... (1978)	1978	
Fantasy in Stereo	Suzi Quatro, Chris Andrews	3.11	Chris Andrews, Len Tuckey	Main Attraction (1982)	1982	
Fear of the Unknown (Long Version)	?	4.56	Mike Chapman	non-album-song	1993	A-side of And so to Bed
**Fear of the Unknown** (Radio Version)	?	3.55	Mike Chapman	non-album-song	1993	A-side of And so to Bed
Fever	Eddie Cooley, John Davenport	3.39	Nicky Chinn, Mike Chapman	Your Mamma Won't Like Me (1975)	1975	
Fever	Eddie Cooley, John Davenport	5.38	Andy Scott	QSP (2017)	2017	
Fire (with Shirlie Roden)	?	?	unknown	Free the Butterfly (1999)	1999	Self-help-Album
Flash	?	3.40	unknown	non-album-song	1994	B-side of If I Get Lucky (Radio Version)
Flying To My Desitiny	?	4.35	unknown	The Girl from Detroit City (2014)	?	
Four Letter Words	Nicky Chinn, Mike Chapman	3.27	Mike Chapman	Suzi ... and Other Four Letter Words (1979)	1979	
Four Letter Words (Remix version)	Nicky Chinn, Mike Chapman	3.59	unknown	What Goes Around – Greatest & Latest (1995)	1995	B-side of What Goes Round
Free the Butterfly	Suzi Quatro	4.55	Andy Scott, Steve Grant	Back to the Drive (2006)	2006	
Friday	Suzi Quatro, Len Tuckey	3.52	Nicky Chinn, Mike Chapman	Quatro (1974)	1974	
Frosty the Snowman	Walter "Jack" Rollins, Steve Nelson	2.45	unknown	Peace on Earth (1994)	1994	B-side of Peace on Earth
Get Back Mama	Suzi Quatro	5.52	Nicky Chinn, Mike Chapman	Suzi Quatro (1973)	1973	
**Glad All Over**	Dave Clark, Mike Smith	2.47	Mike Chapman	Rock Hard (1980)	1980	A-side of Ego in the Night
Glycerine Queen	Suzi Quatro, Len Tuckey	3.47	Nicky Chinn, Mike Chapman	Suzi Quatro (1973)	1973	B-side of All Shook Up
Gold (with Shirlie Roden)	?	?	unknown	Free the Butterfly (1999)	1999	Self-help-Album
Good Girl (Looking for a Bad Time)	Suzi Quatro, Len Tuckey	3.33	Mickie Most	Unreleased Emotion (1998)	1985	B-side of Tonight I Could Fall in Love
Good Kind of Hurt (in The Pleasure Seekers)	B. Stone	2.19	Dick Corby	What a Way to Die (2011)	1968	B-side of Light of Love 7.49–10.07
Gotta Get Away (in The Pleasure Seekers)	?	2.14	unknown	What a Way to Die (2011)	1965–68	
Half as Much as Me	Suzi Quatro, Len Tuckey	4.12	Mickie Most	Aggro-Phobia (1976)	1976	
Half Day Closing (Down at the Superstore) (The Assistants (Cheryl Baker, Dave Edmunds, Suzi Quatro, Junior))	Robertson, Alec, Pearl	3.54	B. A. Robertson	non-album-song	1982	B-side of Down at the Superstore; Theme from the BBC TV series Saturday Superstore
Hard Headed	Eddy Brown, Teresa Straley	4.02	Mike Chapman	Rock Hard (1980)	1980	
Hard Headed Woman	Claude Demetrius	2.02	Mike Chapman	In the Spotlight (2011)	2011	
Heart of Stone (Album Version)	Suzi Quatro, Chris Andrews	4.07	Chris Andrews, Len Tuckey	Main Attraction (1982)	1982	
**Heart of Stone** (Single Version)	Suzi Quatro, Chris Andrews	3.25	Chris Andrews, Len Tuckey	Main Attraction (1982)	1982	A-side of Remote Control
Heartbreak Hotel	Elvis Presley, Mae Boren Axton, Tommy Durden	3.48	Mickie Most	Aggro-Phobia (1976)	1976	
**Heroes** performed by The County Line with Suzi Quatro and many others	David Bowie / Brian Eno	4.12	Mark Cunningham	non-album-song	1986	A-side of A Long Way to Go; Children in Need charity record
**Hey Charly** (The Bolland Project with Suzi Quatro)	Bolland & Bolland	4.27	Bolland & Bolland	The Bolland Project – Darwin (The Evolution) (1991)	1991	Only A-side, a song for Charles Darwin
Hit the Road Jack	Percy Mayfield	3.57	Nicky Chinn, Mike Chapman	Quatro (1974)	1974	
Hollywood	Suzi Quatro, Len Tuckey	2.57	Mike Chapman	Suzi ... and Other Four Letter Words (1979)	1979	
Hot Kiss	Todd Morse, Juliette Lewis, Kemble Walters, Jason Womack	2.47	Davey Meshell	In the Spotlight (2011)	2011	
Hurt with You	Suzi Quatro	4.18	Mike Chapman	In the Spotlight (2011)	2011	
**I Bit Off More Than I Could Chew**	Nicky Chinn, Mike Chapman	3.44	Nicky Chinn, Mike Chapman	Your Mamma Won't Like Me (1975)	1975	A-side of Red Hot Rosie
I Don't Do Gentle	Suzi Quatro, Andy Scott, Steve Grantt	4.24	Andy Scott, Steve Grant	Back to the Drive (2006)	2006	
I Don't Want You (with Reg Presley)	S. Benham, J. Sammes	4.06	Steve Benham	non-album-song	1985	B-side of Wild Thing
**I Go Wild**	Nicky Chinn, S. Glen, M. Burns	3.48	Mickie Most	non-album-song	1984	A-side of I'm a Rocker
**I Got Lost in His Arms** performed by Suzi Quatro, ensemble, orchestra	Irving Berlin	3.04	Norman Newell, Robert Mackintosh	Annie Get Your Gun – 1986 London Cast	1986	A-side of You Can't Get a Man with a Gun
I Got the Sun in the Morning performed by Suzi Quatro, ensemble, orchestra	Irving Berlin	4.54	Norman Newell, Robert Mackintosh	Annie Get Your Gun – 1986 London Cast	1986	
**I May Be Too Young**	Nicky Chinn, Mike Chapman	2.58	Nicky Chinn, Mike Chapman	Your Mamma Won't Like Me (2012)	1975	A-side of Don't Mess Around
**I Need Your Love** (Radio-Mix) (with Chris Norman)	Suzi Quatro, Chris Norman	3.58	Chris Norman	non-album-version	1992	A-side of The Growing Years
**I Need Your Love** (Full-Mix) (with Chris Norman)	Suzi Quatro, Chris Norman	5.53	Chris Norman	Chris Norman-The Growing Years	1992	A-side of The Growing Years
I Walk on Guilded Splinters	Dr. John Creaux	5.57	Andy Scott	QSP (2017)	2017	
I Wanna Be Free	Suzi Quatro, Len Tuckey	3.03	Nicky Chinn, Mike Chapman	Quatro (2011)	1974	B-side of Too Big
I Wanna Be Your Man	John Lennon, Paul McCartney	3.09	Nicky Chinn, Mike Chapman	Suzi Quatro (1973)	1973	
I'll Grow on You	Suzi Quatro, Len Tuckey	3.07	Nicky Chinn, Mike Chapman	Aggro-Phobia (2012)	1977	B-side of Roxy Roller
**I'll Walk Through the Fire with You**	Suzi Quatro, Andy Scott, Steve Grant, Laura Tuckey, S. Roden	4.26	Andy Scott, Steve Grant	Back to the Drive (2006)	2006	No B-side
I'm a Bad, Bad Man performed by Eric Flynn, girls, orchestra	Irving Berlin	2.27	Norman Newell, Robert Mackintosh	Annie Get Your Gun – 1986 London Cast	1986	
I'm a Rocker	Suzi Quatro, Len Tuckey	3.00	Len Tuckey	Unreleased Emotion (1998)	1984	B-side of I Go Wild
I'm an Indian Too performed by Suzi Quatro, orchestra	Irving Berlin	3.19	Norman Newell, Robert Mackintosh	Annie Get Your Gun – 1986 London Cast	1986	
**I've Never Been in Love**	Melissa A. Connell	3.02	Mike Chapman	Suzi ... and Other Four Letter Words (1979)	1979	A-side of Starlight Lady
If Ever There Was A Reason	?	4.20	unknown	The Girl from Detroit City (2014)	?	
If I Get Lucky (Long version)	?	5.12	Mike Chapman	non-album-song	1994	B-side of If I Get Lucky (Radio Version)
**If I Get Lucky** (Radio Version)	?	3.56	Mike Chapman	non-album-song	1994	A-side of If I Get Lucky (Long version)
If Only	Suzi Quatro, Dick Wagner	4.42	Andy Scott	QSP (2017)	2017	
**If You Can't Give Me Love**	Nicky Chinn, Mike Chapman	3.53	Mike Chapman	If You Knew Suzi... (1978)	1978	A-side of Cream Dream
**If You Can't Give Me Love** (remix)	Nicky Chinn, Mike Chapman	5.08	unknown	What Goes Around – Greatest & Latest (1995)	1996	A-side of Empty Rooms
In the Morning	Suzi Quatro, Len Tuckey	2.34	Nicky Chinn, Mike Chapman	Quatro (2011)	1974	B-side of Devil Gate Drive
Intimate Strangers	Suzi Quatro, Rhiannon Wolfe	4.22	Bolland & Bolland	Oh Suzi Q. (1990)	1990	B-side of The Great Midnight Rock 'n' Roll House Party
Intro by DJ the Lord (in The Pleasure Seekers)	?	1.00	unknown	What a Way to Die (2011)	1965–68	
Introductions (with Shirlie Roden)	?	?	unknown	Free the Butterfly (1999)	1999	Self-help-Album
Johnny B. Goode	Chuck Berry	1.52		?	1977	TV series Happy Days
Johnny B. Goode	Chuck Berry	4.28		?	2015	concert in Sydney
Just Like a Woman	Bob Dylan	5.12	Andy Scott	QSP (2017)	2017	
Just Like Momma	Suzi Quatro, Len Tuckey	3.35	unknown	Unreleased Emotion (1998)	1998	
**Keep A-Knockin'**	Richard Penniman	3.14	Nicky Chinn, Mike Chapman	Quatro (1974)	1974	A-side of Cat Size (US)
Kids of Tragedy	Mike Chapman	3.37	Nicky Chinn, Mike Chapman	Aggro-Phobia (2012)	1976	
**Kiss Me Goodbye**	Suzi Quatro, Rhiannon Wolfe	4.08	Bolland & Bolland	Oh Suzi Q. (1990)	1991	A-side of Kiss Me Goodbye (Instrumental)
Kiss Me Goodbye (Instrumental)	Bolland & Bolland	4.25	Bolland & Bolland	non-album-version	1990	B-side of Kiss Me Goodbye'
Kiss Me Goodbye (Special Remix Version)	Bolland & Bolland	6.21	Bolland & Bolland	non-album-version	1990	12'-Single
Klondyke Kate	Suzi Quatro, Len Tuckey	3.30	Nicky Chinn, Mike Chapman	Quatro (1974)	1974	
Late Nights Early Flights	Suzi Quatro, Andy Scott	3.52	Andy Scott	QSP (2017)	2017	
Lay Me Down	Suzi Quatro, Len Tuckey, Jamie Crompton	3.33	Mike Chapman	Rock Hard (1980)	1980	
**Let It Be** (one of the 62 singers in the chorus of Ferry Aid)	Lennon–McCartney	6.08	Stock Aitken Waterman	non-album-song	1987	A-side of Let It Be (Gospel Jam Mix)
Let It Be (Gospel Jam Mix (Ferry Aid))	Lennon–McCartney	2.50	Stock Aitken Waterman	non-album-song	1987	B-side of Let It Be
Let the Children Sing	Suzi Quatro	4.08	unknown	non-album-song	1994	
**Light of Love** (in The Pleasure Seekers)	G. Fischoff, C. Bayer	3:00	Dick Corby	What a Way to Die (2011)	1968	A-side of Good Kind of Hurt 4.47–7.45
**Lipstick**	Nicky Chinn, Mike Chapman	4.09	Mike Chapman	Rock Hard (1980)	1980	A-side of Woman Cry
Little Bitch Blue	Suzi Quatro, Len Tuckey	3:25	Nicky Chinn, Mike Chapman	Suzi Quatro (2011)	1973	B-side of 48 Crash
Little Sister	Doc Pomus, Mort Shuman	3.09	Andy Scott	QSP (2017)	2017	
Locked In Your Love	?	2.35	unknown	The Girl from Detroit City (2014)	?	
Locked In Your Love (in The Pleasure Seekers)	?	2.32	unknown	What a Way to Die (2011)	1965–68	
Lonely is the Hardest	Suzi Quatro, Len Tuckey	3.47	Mike Chapman	Rock Hard (1980)	1980	
Long Way From Home	Suzi Quatro, Andy Scott	6.14	Andy Scott	QSP (2017)	2017	
Love And War	?	3.32	unknown	The Girl from Detroit City (2014)	?	
Love Hurts	Suzi Quatro, Len Tuckey	2.45	Mike Chapman	Suzi ... and Other Four Letter Words (1979)	1979	
Love Is Ready	Eddy Brown, Teresa Straley	3.30	Mike Chapman	Rock Hard (1980)	1980	
Love Touch (Album Version)	Bolland & Bolland	5.24	Bolland & Bolland	Oh Suzi Q. (1990)	1990	
**Love Touch** (Single Version)	Bolland & Bolland	3.57	Bolland & Bolland	non-album-version	1990	A-side of We Found Love
**Main Attraction**	Suzi Quatro, Chris Andrews	3.15	Chris Andrews, Len Tuckey	Main Attraction (1982)	1982	A-side of Transparent
Make Love To Me	Suzi Quatro	4:35	unknown	What Goes Around – Greatest & Latest (1995)	?	
**Make Me Smile**	Steve Harley	3.43	Mickie Most	Aggro-Phobia (1976)	1976	A-side of Same as I Do
**Mama's Boy**	Suzi Quatro, Len Tuckey	3.35	Mike Chapman	Suzi ... and Other Four Letter Words (1979)	1979	A-side of Mind Demons
Mend A Broken Heart	Andy Scott	3.24	Andy Scott	QSP (2017)	2017	
**Michael**	Suzi Quatro, Len Tuckey	3.31	Nicky Chinn, Mike Chapman	Your Mamma Won't Like Me (1975)	1975	A-side of Savage Silk
Mind Demons	Suzi Quatro, Len Tuckey	2.25	Mike Chapman	Suzi ... and Other Four Letter Words (1979)	1979	B-side of Mama's Boy
Moonshine Lullaby performed by Suzi Quatro, Tony Pedretti, Steve Fortune, Peter Ledbury, Tony O'Rourke, orchestra	Irving Berlin	3.47	Norman Newell, Robert Mackintosh	Annie Get Your Gun – 1986 London Cast	1986	
Move It	Ian Samwell	3.38	Nicky Chinn, Mike Chapman	Quatro (1974)	1974	
Mr. Power (in The Pleasure Seekers)	?	5.14	unknown	What a Way to Die (2011)	1965–68	31.54–37.05
My Defences Are Down performed by Eric Flynn, chorus, orchestra	Irving Berlin	3.25	Norman Newell, Robert Mackintosh	Annie Get Your Gun – 1986 London Cast	1986	
**Never Thought You'd Leave Me** (in The Pleasure Seekers)	Dave Leone	2.09	David A. Leone	What a Way to Die (2011)	1966	A-side of What a Way to Die
New Day Woman	Suzi Quatro, Len Tuckey	3.37	Nicky Chinn, Mike Chapman	Your Mamma Won't Like Me (1975)	1975	
No Choice	Suzi Quatro, Jean Roussel	5.30	Andy Scott, Steve Grant	Back to the Drive (2006)	2006	
No Choice (Demo Version)	Suzi Quatro, Jean Roussel	3.54	Andy Scott, Steve Grant	The Girl from Detroit City (2014)	2014	
Non-Citizen	Suzi Quatro, Len Tuckey	3.17	Mike Chapman	If You Knew Suzi... (1978)	1978	B-side of The Race Is On
Official Suburban Superman	Suzi Quatro, Len Tuckey	3.05	Nicky Chinn, Mike Chapman	Suzi Quatro (1973)	1973	
Oh Baby	Suzi Quatro, Len Tuckey	3.53	Chris Andrews, Len Tuckey	Main Attraction (1982)	1982	
Old Fashioned Wedding performed by Suzi Quatro, Eric Flynn, orchestra	Irving Berlin	2.27	Norman Newell, Robert Mackintosh	Annie Get Your Gun – 1986 London Cast	1986	
One Dance Too Long	Suzi Quatro	3.25	?	In the Dark (2011)	2011	
Overture performed by orchestra	Irving Berlin	2.08	Norman Newell, Robert Mackintosh	Annie Get Your Gun – 1986 London Cast	1986	
Pain (Band Version)	Suzi Quatro, Andy Scott	4.03	Andy Scott	QSP (2017)	2017	
Pain (Orchestral)	Suzi Quatro, Andy Scott	4.08	Andy Scott	QSP (2017)	2017	
Paralysed	Suzi Quatro, Len Tuckey	2.44	Nicky Chinn, Mike Chapman	Your Mamma Won't Like Me (1975)	1975	
Pardon Me	Suzi Quatro, Len Tuckey	3.29	unknown	Unreleased Emotion (1998)	1998	
**Peace on Earth** (Christmas All Stars) (Radio edit)	Henry Wadsworth Longfellow	3.20	unknown	Peace on Earth (1994)	1994	A-side of Frosty the Snowman
**Peace on Earth** (Christmas All Stars) (Album Version)	Henry Wadsworth Longfellow	4.25	unknown	Peace on Earth (1994)	1994	
Peter, Peter	Suzi Quatro, Len Tuckey	2.51	Nicky Chinn, Mike Chapman	Your Mamma Won't Like Me (2012)	1975	B-side of Your Mamma Won't Like Me
Primitive Love	Nicky Chinn, Mike Chapman	4.13	Nicky Chinn, Mike Chapman	Suzi Quatro (1973)	1973	
Prisoner of Your Imagination	Suzi Quatro, Len Tuckey	4.51	Nicky Chinn, Mike Chapman	Your Mamma Won't Like Me (1975)	1975	
Reach Out I'll Be There (in The Pleasure Seekers)	Holland–Dozier–Holland	3.30	?	non-album-song	1968	
Red Hot Rosie	Suzi Quatro, Len Tuckey	3.52	Nicky Chinn, Mike Chapman	Your Mamma Won't Like Me (2012)	1975	B-side of I Bit Off More Than I Could Chew
Remote Control	Suzi Quatro, Len Tuckey	3.21	Chris Andrews, Len Tuckey	Main Attraction (1982)	1982	B-side of Heart of Stone
Rock and Roll, Hoochie Koo	Rick Derringer	3.24	Mike Chapman	If You Knew Suzi... (1978)	1978	
**Rock Hard**	Nicky Chinn, Mike Chapman	3.18	Mike Chapman	Rock Hard (1980)	1980	A-side of State of Mind
Rockin' in the Free World	Neil Young	4.57	Andy Scott, Steve Grant	Back to the Drive (2006)	2006	
Rockin' Moonbeam	Suzi Quatro, Len Tuckey	2.52	Nicky Chinn, Mike Chapman	Suzi Quatro (1973)	1973	
**Rolling Stone**	Errol Brown, Phil Dennys	2.43	Mickie Most	The Suzi Quatro Story (1975)	1972	A-side of Brain Confusion
Roman Fingers	Suzi Quatro, Len Tuckey	3.45	Nicky Chinn, Mike Chapman	Suzi Quatro (2011)	1973	B-side of Daytona Demon
Rosie Rose	Mike Chapman	4.04	Mike Chapman	In the Spotlight (2011)	2011	
**Roxy Roller**	Nick Gilder, James McCulloch	3.06	Nicky Chinn, Mike Chapman	Aggro-Phobia (2012)	1977	A-side of I'll Grow on You
Same as I Do	Suzi Quatro, Len Tuckey	2.09	Nicky Chinn, Mike Chapman	Aggro-Phobia (2012)	1977	B-side of Make Me Smile
Savage Silk	Nicky Chinn, Mike Chapman	3.36	Nicky Chinn, Mike Chapman	Quatro (1974)	1975	B-side of Michael
Secret Hideaway	Suzi Quatro, Len Tuckey	3.42	unknown	Unreleased Emotion (1998)	1998	
Shake My Sugar	Suzi Quatro, Len Tuckey	3.55	Nicky Chinn, Mike Chapman ?	Quatro (2011)	1974	B-side of The Wild One
Shakin' All Over	Johnny Kidd	3.33	Nicky Chinn, Mike Chapman	Suzi Quatro (1973)	1973	
She Knows	Suzi Quatro, Len Tuckey	3.11	Chris Andrews, Len Tuckey	Main Attraction (1982)	1982	
**She's in Love with You**	Nicky Chinn, Mike Chapman	3.32	Mike Chapman	Suzi ... and Other Four Letter Words (1979)	1979	A-side of Space Cadets
Shine My Machine	Suzi Quatro, Len Tuckey	3.49	Nicky Chinn, Mike Chapman	Suzi Quatro (1973)	1973	
Shot of Rhythm and Blues	Terry Thompson	4.53	Nicky Chinn, Mike Chapman	Quatro (1974)	1974	
Singing with Angels	Suzi Quatro	6.00	Andy Scott, Steve Grant	In the Dark (2011)	2006	
**Singing with Angels** (Australian September tour limited edition)	Suzi Quatro	3.55	Andy Scott, Steve Grant	In the Spotlight (2011)	2006	No B-side
Skin Tight Skin	Suzi Quatro, Len Tuckey	4.21	Nicky Chinn, Mike Chapman	Suzi Quatro (1973)	1973	
Slow Down	Larry Williams	3.45	Andy Scott	QSP (2017)	2017	
Sometimes Love Is Letting Go	Suzi Quatro, S. Roden	4.35	Andy Scott, Steve Grant	Back to the Drive (2006)	2006	
Southern Comfort	Suzi Quatro, Bolland & Bolland	5.40	Bolland & Bolland	Oh Suzi Q. (1990)	1990	
Space Cadets	Suzi Quatro, Len Tuckey	4.18	Mike Chapman	Suzi ... and Other Four Letter Words (1979)	1979	B-side of She's in Love with You
Spotlight	Mike Chapman	3.21	Mike Chapman	In the Spotlight (2011)	2011	
Starlight Lady	Suzi Quatro, Len Tuckey	3.36	Mike Chapman	Suzi ... and Other Four Letter Words (1979)	1980	B-side of I've Never Been in Love
Starry Night	Suzi Quatro, Len Tuckey	3.44	unknown	Unreleased Emotion (1998)	1998	
State of Mind	Suzi Quatro, Len Tuckey	2.29	Mike Chapman	Rock Hard (1980)	1980	B-side of Rock Hard
Sticks & Stones	Suzi Quatro, Len Tuckey	3.41	Nicky Chinn, Mike Chapman	Suzi Quatro (1973)	1973	
Stone (with Shirlie Roden)	?	?	unknown	Free the Butterfly (1999)	1999	Self-help-Album
Strange Encounters	Suzi Quatro, Len Tuckey	3.08	unknown	Unreleased Emotion (1998)	1998	
Strict Machine	Alison Goldfrapp, Will Gregory, Nick Batt	3.10	Davey Meshell	In the Spotlight (2011)	2011	
Strip Me	Nicky Chinn, Mike Chapman	3.10	Nicky Chinn, Mike Chapman	Your Mamma Won't Like Me (1975)	1975	
**Stumblin' In** (with Chris Norman)	Nicky Chinn, Mike Chapman	3.57	Mike Chapman	What Goes Around – Greatest & Latest (1995)	1978	A-side of A Stranger with You
Sugar Flash Rapper	?	3.32	unknown	The Girl from Detroit City (2014)	?	
Suicide	Suzi Quatro, Len Tuckey	4.05	Mike Chapman	If You Knew Suzi... (1978)	1978	
Suzi Q (Susie Q)	Dale Hawkins, Robert Chaisson, Stan Lewis, Eleanor Broadwater	1.20	unknown	Unreleased Emotion (1998)	1998	
Suzi Q.	Dale Hawkins, Robert Chaisson, Stan Lewis, Eleanor Broadwater	4.32	Bolland & Bolland	Oh Suzi Q. (1990)	1990	
Sweet Nothin's	Brenda Lee	1.52	unknown	The Girl from Detroit City (2014)	?	
Take Me In Your Arms (And Rock Me)	Holland–Dozier–Holland	3.11	Bolland & Bolland	Oh Suzi Q. (1990)	1990	
**Tear Me Apart**	Nicky Chinn, Mike Chapman	2.29	Nicky Chinn, Mike Chapman	Aggro-Phobia (1976)	1976	A-side of Same as I Do
Tear Me Apart (alternative version)	Nicky Chinn, Mike Chapman	3.07	Mickie Most	Aggro-Phobia (2012)	1976	
Teddybear	?	0.45	?	?	2011 ?	
The Cost Of Living	?	3.33	unknown	The Girl from Detroit City (2014)	?	
**The Girl from Detroit City**	?	4.05	Steve Benham	The Girl from Detroit City (2014)	2014	No B-side
The Girl That I Marry performed by Eric Flynn, orchestra	Irving Berlin	1.08	Norman Newell, Robert Mackintosh	Annie Get Your Gun – 1986 London Cast	1986	
**The Great Midnight Rock 'n' Roll House Party**	Bolland & Bolland	4.18	Bolland & Bolland	Oh Suzi Q. (1990)	1990	A-side of Intimate Strangers
The Growing Years (with Chris Norman)	Chris Norman	3.44	Chris Norman-The Growing Years	Chris Norman	1992	B-side of I Need Your Love
The Honky Tonk Downstairs	Dallas Frazier	3.00	Mickie Most	Aggro-Phobia (1976)	1976	
The Price of Love	The Everly Brothers	5.05	Andy Scott	QSP (2017)	2017	
**The Race Is On**	Nicky Chinn, Mike Chapman	4.02	Mike Chapman	If You Knew Suzi... (1978)	1978	A-side of Non-Citizen
**The Wild One**	Nicky Chinn, Mike Chapman	2.54	Nicky Chinn, Mike Chapman	Quatro (1974)	1974	A-side of Shake My Sugar
There She Goes	Suzi Quatro, Len Tuckey	2.49	unknown	Unreleased Emotion (1998)	1998	
There's No Business Like Show Business performed by Zimmerman, Edmund Hockridge, Eric Flynn, Suzi Quatro, orchestra	Irving Berlin	4.12	Norman Newell, Robert Mackintosh	Annie Get Your Gun – 1986 London Cast	1986	
There's No Business Like Show Business (reprise) performed by ensemble, orchestra	Irving Berlin	2.03	Norman Newell, Robert Mackintosh	Annie Get Your Gun – 1986 London Cast	1986	
They Say It's Wonderful performed by Eric Flynn, Suzi Quatro, orchestra	Irving Berlin	4.29	Norman Newell, Robert Mackintosh	Annie Get Your Gun – 1986 London Cast	1986	
They Say It's Wonderful" (reprise) performed by full company, orchestra	Irving Berlin	1.36	Norman Newell, Robert Mackintosh	Annie Get Your Gun – 1986 London Cast	1986	
Three Time Loser	Suzi Quatro	3.09	?	In the Dark (2011)	2011	
Tired Of Waiting	Ray Davies	3.29	Mike Chapman	If You Knew Suzi... (1978)	1978	
Tobacco Road	John D. Loudermilk	3.42	Andy Scott	QSP (2017)	2017	
**Tonight I Could Fall in Love**	Richard Gower	3.54	Mickie Most	non-album-song	1985	A-side of Good Girl (Looking for a Bad Time)
**Tonight I Could Fall in Love** (extended version)	Richard Gower	6.07	Mickie Most	non-album-song	1985	A-side of Good Girl (Looking for a Bad Time)
**Too Big**	Nicky Chinn, Mike Chapman	3.22	Nicky Chinn, Mike Chapman	Quatro (1974)	1974	A-side of "I Wanna Be Free
Tossin' and Turnin'	Ritchie Adams, Malou Rene	3.17	Andy Scott	QSP (2017)	2017	
Touch the Child in Me	Suzi Quatro	3.17	?	In the Dark (2011)	2011	
Transparent	Suzi Quatro, Len Tuckey	3.18	Chris Andrews, Len Tuckey	Main Attraction (1982)	1982	B-side of Main Attraction
Trouble	Jerry Leiber, Mike Stoller	3.46	Nicky Chinn, Mike Chapman	Quatro (1974)	1974	
Truck Stop	Suzi Quatro	3.31	?	In the Dark (2011)	2011	
Turn Into	Brian Chase, Karen Lee Orzolek, Nick Zinner	3.48	Davey Meshell	In the Spotlight (2011)	2011	
Two Miles Out of Georgia	Chris Andrews	3.30	Chris Andrews, Len Tuckey	Main Attraction (1982)	1982	
Victim of Circumstance	Suzi Quatro	4.21	Bolland & Bolland	Oh Suzi Q. (1990)	1990	
Wake Up Little Susie	Felice Bryant	2.49	Mickie Most	Aggro-Phobia (1976)	1976	
Walking Through The Changes	?	3.52	unknown	The Girl from Detroit City (2014)	?	
Warm Leatherette	Daniel Miller	3.24	unknown	The Girl from Detroit City (2014)	?	
Wasted Moments	Suzi Quatro, Andy Scott, Steve Grant	5.00	Andy Scott, Steve Grant	Back to the Drive (2006)	2006	
Water (with Shirlie Roden)	?	10.08	unknown	Free the Butterfly (1999)	1999	Self-help-Album
We Found Love (Album Version)	Bolland & Bolland	5.13	Bolland & Bolland	Oh Suzi Q. (1990)	1988	A-side of We Found Love (Instrumental)
**We Found Love** (Single Version)	Bolland & Bolland	3.56	Bolland & Bolland	Oh Suzi Q. (1990)	1988	A-side of We Found Love (Instrumental) and B-side of Love Touch (1992)
We Found Love (Instrumental)	Bolland & Bolland	3.48	Bolland & Bolland	non-album-version	1988	B-side of We Found Love
We Live Forever	Bolland & Bolland	5.17	Bolland & Bolland	Oh Suzi Q. (1990)	1990	
What a Way to Die (in The Pleasure Seekers)	Dave Leone	2.14	David A. Leone	What a Way to Die (2011)	1966	B-side of Never Thought You'd Leave Me
What Goes Around (Album Version)	Suzi Quatro	4.34	unknown	What Goes Around – Greatest & Latest (1995)	1995	
What Goes Around (Demo Version)	Suzi Quatro	3.08	unknown	The Girl from Detroit City (2014)	1995	
**What Goes Around** (Radio Edit)	Suzi Quatro	3.24	unknown	non-album-version	1995	A-side of Four Letter Words (Remix version)
What's It Like to Be Loved	Suzi Quatro, Len Tuckey	3.13	Mike Chapman	Aggro-Phobia (1976)	1976	
**Whatever Love Is**	Mike Chapman, Holly Knight	4.44	unknown	In the Spotlight (2011)	2011	No B-side
Where Have You Gone (in The Pleasure Seekers)	?	4.16	unknown	What a Way to Die (2011)	1965–68	
White Pig Blues (in The Pleasure Seekers)	?	4.57	unknown	What a Way to Die (2011)	1965–68	
Why Do Rainbows Die	Suzi Quatro	3.53	?	In the Dark (2011)	2011	
Wild In The Night	?	3.16	unknown	The Girl from Detroit City (2014)	?	
Wild Horse Ceremonial Dance also known as "Drum Dance" or "Ceremonial Dance" performed by Peter Lucadou-Wells, Indians, orchestra	Irving Berlin	4.03	Norman Newell, Robert Mackintosh	Annie Get Your Gun – 1986 London Cast	1986	
**Wild Thing** (with Reg Presley)	Chip Taylor	4.00	Steve Benham	The Girl from Detroit City (2014)	1985	A-side of I Don't Want You
Wiser Than You	Suzi Quatro, Len Tuckey	3.53	Mike Chapman	If You Knew Suzi... (1978)	1978	B-side of Don't Change My Luck
Wiser Than You (Alternative Version)	Suzi Quatro, Len Tuckey	?	Mike Chapman	If You Knew Suzi... (2014)	1978	
Wish Upon Me	Eddy Brown, Teresa Straley, David Krems	2.56	Mike Chapman	Rock Hard (1980)	1980	
Woman Cry	Suzi Quatro, Len Tuckey	3.39	Mike Chapman	Rock Hard (1980)	1980	B-side of Lipstick
Wood (with Shirlie Roden)	?	?	unknown	Free the Butterfly (1999)	1999	Self-help-Album
You Are My Lover	Jack Lee	3.12	Mike Chapman	Suzi ... and Other Four Letter Words (1979)	1979	
You Can Make Me Want You	Suzi Quatro, Len Tuckey	3.43	Nicky Chinn, Mike Chapman	Your Mamma Won't Like Me (1975)	1975	
You Can't Get a Man with a Gun performed by Suzi Quatro, orchestra	Irving Berlin	2.44	Norman Newell, Robert Mackintosh	Annie Get Your Gun – 1986 London Cast	1986	B-side of I Got Lost in His Arms
**Your Mamma Won't Like Me**	Nicky Chinn, Mike Chapman	3.39	Nicky Chinn, Mike Chapman	Your Mamma Won't Like Me (1975)	1975	A-side of Peter, Peter

=== Instrumental versions ===
- Baby You're a Star (too)
- Kiss Me Goodbye (too)
- We Found Love (too)

=== Suzi Quatro songs covered by others ===
Song	Writer(s)	Original artist	Name	Album	Year	Other
48 Crash	Nicky Chinn, Mike Chapman	a) James Last b) Jutta Weinhold	a) 48 Crash / Skweeze Me, Pleeze Me / Can The Can (instrumental medley) b) Feuer und Eis (German)	a) Non Stop Party 1974 b) - c) Mi...Ti...Amo	1973	
Can the Can	Nicky Chinn, Mike Chapman	a) James Last b) Anne Overath c) Marcella Bella	a) 48 Crash / Skweeze Me, Pleeze Me / Can The Can (instrumental medley) b) Can the Can (German) c) Can the Can	a) Non Stop Party 1974 b) - c) Mi...Ti...Amo	1973	
Daytona Demon	Nicky Chinn, Mike Chapman	Die Fee	Daytona Demon (German)	-	1974	
Devil Gate Drive	Nicky Chinn, Mike Chapman	a) James Last b) Tommy James	a) Do You Wanna Dance / Who Ever Told You / Devil Gate Drive (instrumental medley) b) Devil Gate Drive	a) Non Stop Dancing 1974 / 2 b) In Touch	1974	
I Bit Off More Than I Could Chew	Nicky Chinn, Mike Chapman	Bo Donaldson and The Heywoods	I Bit Off More Than I Could Chew	Farther On	1976	
I've Never Been in Love	Melissa A. Connell	a) Bernhard Brink b) Katrin Lindner & Schubert-Band c )Věra Špinarová	a) Fieber (German) b) I've Never Been in Love c) Predposlední vlak (Czech)	a) Ein Schritt nach vorne b) - c) -	1980	
Love Is Ready	Eddy Brown, Teresa Straley	Lena Valaitis	Ich glaub' an ein Leben vor dem Tod (German)	Lena	1982	
Mama's Boy	Suzi Quatro, Len Tuckey	Elke Best	Mama's Boy (German)		1979	
She's in Love with You	Nicky Chinn, Mike Chapman	a) Bernhard Brink b) Cliff Carpenter und sein Orchester	a) Ich wär' so gern wie du (German) b) Ich wär' so gern wie du (instrumental)	a) Ich wär' so gern wie du b) She's In Love With You	1979	
Stumblin' In	Nicky Chinn, Mike Chapman	Bernd Clüver and Marion Maerz	Schau mal herein (German)	-	1978	
Tear Me Apart	Nicky Chinn, Mike Chapman	Tanya Tucker	Tear Me Apart	Tear Me Apart	1979	
Your Mamma Won't Like Me	Nicky Chinn, Mike Chapman	Alice Cooper	Your Mamma Won't Like Me	Breadcrumbs (EP, 2019)	2019	

My Heart and Soul. (I need you home for Christmas) S Quatro R Tuckey Download 2020

== As Quatro, Scott & Powell ==
- Members: Suzi Quatro, Andy Scott, Don Powell

Song	Writer(s)	Time	Producer	Album	Year	Other
Bright Lights, Big City	Jimmy Reed	5.45	Andy Scott	Quatro, Scott & Powell	2017	
Broken Pieces Suite	Suzi Quatro	5.54	Andy Scott	Quatro, Scott & Powell	2017	
Fever	Eddie Cooley, John Davenport	5.38	Andy Scott	Quatro, Scott & Powell	2017	
I Walk on Gilded Splinters	Dr. John Creaux	5.57	Andy Scott	Quatro, Scott & Powell	2017	
If Only	Dick Wagner, Suzi Quatro	4.42	Andy Scott	Quatro, Scott & Powell	2017	
Just Like A Woman	Bob Dylan	5.12	Andy Scott	Quatro, Scott & Powell	2017	
Late Nights Early Flights	Andy Scott, Suzi Quatro	3.52	Andy Scott	Quatro, Scott & Powell	2017	
Little Sister	Doc Pomus, Mort Shuman	3.09	Andy Scott	Quatro, Scott & Powell	2017	
Long Way From Home	Andy Scott, Suzi Quatro	6.14	Andy Scott	Quatro, Scott & Powell	2017	
Mend A Broken Heart	Andy Scott	3.24	Andy Scott	Quatro, Scott & Powell	2017	
Pain (Band Version)	Andy Scott, Suzi Quatro	4.08	Andy Scott	Quatro, Scott & Powell	2017	
Pain (Orchestral)	Andy Scott, Suzi Quatro	4.08	Andy Scott	Quatro, Scott & Powell	2017	
Slow Down	Larry Williams	3.45	Andy Scott	Quatro, Scott & Powell	2017	
The Price of Love	Don Everly and Phil Everly	5.05	Andy Scott	Quatro, Scott & Powell	2017	
Tobacco Road	John D. Loudermilk	3.42	Andy Scott	Quatro, Scott & Powell	2017	
Tossin' and Turnin'	Ritchie Adams, Malou Rene	3.17	Andy Scott	Quatro, Scott & Powell	2017	

=== Cover versions ===
Song	Writer(s)	Original artist	Album	Year	Other
Bright Lights, Big City	Jimmy Reed	Jimmy Reed	Jimmy Reed at Carnegie Hall	1961	
Fever	Eddie Cooley, John Davenport	Little Willie John	Fever	1956	
I Walk on Gilded Splinters	Dr. John Creaux	Dr. John	Gris-Gris	1968	
Just Like A Woman	Bob Dylan	Bob Dylan	Blonde on Blonde	1966	
Little Sister	Doc Pomus, Mort Shuman	Elvis Presley	none	1961	
Slow Down	Larry Williams	Larry Williams	none	1958	
The Price of Love	Don Everly and Phil Everly	The Everly Brothers	In Our Image	1965	
Tobacco Road	John D. Loudermilk	The Nashville Teens	Tobacco Road	1964	
Tossin' and Turnin'	Ritchie Adams, Malou Rene	Bobby Lewis	Tossin' and Turnin'	1961	

My Heart and Soul. (I need you home for christmas) Suzi Quatro, Richard Tuckey
