= Rock Hard (album) =

Studio album by Suzi Quatro
- Released: October 1980
- Recorded: June 18, 1980 – July 3, 1980
- Studio: United Western Studios (Hollywood, California)
- Genre: Rock; hard rock; pop rock
- Length: 36:16
- Label: Dreamland
- Producer: Mike Chapman

Suzi Quatro chronology
Suzi ... and Other Four Letter Words (1979)	Rock Hard (1980)	Main Attraction (1982)

Singles from Rock Hard
- 1. "Rock Hard" Released: 1980; 2. "Glad All Over" Released: 1980; 3. "Lipstick" Released: 1980; 4. "Ego in the Night" Released: 1981; 5. "Woman Cry" Released: 1981; 6. "State of Mind" Released: 1981

Rock Hard is the seventh studio album by American rock musician Suzi Quatro, released in October 1980 by Dreamland Records, her first and only release by the label. It was recorded over a period of one month in 1980, at United Western Studios, in Hollywood. It features three prolific guest backing vocalists, including Paul Delph, Michael Des Barres, and Andrea Robinson. It is notably her last studio album to chart anywhere for twenty-six years, until she released Back to the Drive (2006). The album featured the songs "Rock Hard", "Glad All Over", and "Lipstick" which were all released as singles. The aforementioned title track was a commercial success, peaking at number 9 in Australia, but only peaked at number 68 in the UK, while "Lipstick" was only a moderate success peaking at number 46 in Australia, and at number 51 in US. "Glad All Over", a cover version of a song originally by the Dave Clark Five, unlike the other singles was the only one to chart in Belgium, peaking at number 25.

On release, the album was received favorably by the majority of music critics, with many critics claiming it to be her best album of the 1980s. However, it was still Quatro's poorest selling studio album up to that point in the US and Norway, although in Australia Quatro was given a gold record for both the album and single by musical entrepreneur Molly Meldrum in 1981.

The album was re-released in 2012, and was the first of several remastered reissues by Cherry Red Records on CD. Cherry Red have since released other Quatro remasters, as well as releasing her fifteenth studio album, In the Spotlight (2011).

== Critical reception ==
Professional ratings
Review scores
Source	Rating
AllMusic	3.5/5 stars
Billboard	(unrated)

In a retrospective review for AllMusic, critic Donald A. Guarisco wrote of the album "Although it lacks the kind of single that would have put it over the top commercially, Rock Hard is so consistent and likable that it is tough to argue with. In short, Rock Hard is a necessity and a solid listen for anyone interested in what female-oriented rock was like before the advent of [riot] grrl rockers like L7 and Hole."

== Track listing ==
Rock Hard track listing
No.	Title	Writer(s)	Length
1.	"Rock Hard"	Mike Chapman; Nicky Chinn	3:18
2.	"Glad All Over"	Dave Clark; Mike Smith	2:47
3.	"Love Is Ready"	Eddy Brown; Teresa Straley	3:30
4.	"State of Mind"	Suzi Quatro; Len Tuckey	2:59
5.	"Woman Cry"	Quatro; Tuckey	3:39
6.	"Lipstick"	Chapman; Chinn	4:09
7.	"Hard Headed"	Brown; Straley	4:02
8.	"Ego in the Night"	Quatro; Tuckey	3:36
9.	"Lonely is the Hardest"	Quatro; Tuckey	3:47
10.	"Lay Me Down"	Quatro; Tuckey; Jamie Crompton	3:33
11.	"Wish Upon Me"	Brown; Straley; David Krems	2:56
Total length:			36:16

== Personnel ==
- Suzi Quatro – lead vocals; bass guitar; organ
- Len Tuckey – lead guitar; backing vocals
- Jamie Crompton – guitar
- Dave Neal – drums
- Andrea Robinson – backing vocals
- Linda Lawley – backing vocals
- Michael Des Barres – backing vocals
- Paul Delph – backing vocals
- Sue Richman – backing vocals
- Mike Chapman – producer

== Charts ==
Chart performance for Rock Hard
Chart (1980–1981)	Peak position
Australian Albums (Kent Music Report)	31
Norwegian Albums (VG-lista)	22
US Billboard 200	165
