= Back to the Drive =

Studio album by Suzi Quatro
- Released: March 14, 2006
- Genre: Rock; folk rock; raga rock
- Label: EMI (Europe, Australia); Liberty (UK); Caroline (US)
- Producer: Andy Scott; Steve Grant

Suzi Quatro chronology
Free the Butterfly (1998)	Back to the Drive (2006)	In the Spotlight (2011)

Singles from Back to the Drive
- 1. "I'll Walk Through the Fire with You"

Back to the Drive is the eleventh studio album by Suzi Quatro. Released in March 2006, it was her comeback album, and her first since 1990's Oh Suzi Q. (apart from 1995's What Goes Around, which contained mostly re-recordings of her oldies, and 1998's Unreleased Emotion which had been recorded in 1983, but until then unreleased). Produced by Sweet guitarist Andy Scott and Steve Grant with input from Quatro's classic era producer Mike Chapman, this release features backing vocals by Shirlie Roden, ex-husband Len Tuckey on guitar, and includes her daughter, Laura Quatro (then Laura Tuckey), duetting with her on the download-only single "I'll Walk Through the Fire With You".

It was issued on EMI Records throughout the world, and in the UK on the revived Liberty Records and EMI distributed independent label Caroline Records in North America.

== Music ==
The album is an eclectic affair that draws from several different music styles. The rock title track samples the intro from "Devil Gate Drive" and the guitar line from her debut worldwide hit "Can The Can". "15 Minutes of Fame" has a folk rock flavour to it. "Duality" is derived from an Indian raga and was co-written with Vicki Tischler Blue (Formerly of The Runaways later Line-up). "I Don't Do Gentle" is a throwback to 1950's big band rock. As with most of her albums, Quatro includes a cover song, a version of the Neil Young song "Rockin' in the Free World".

There are two ballads on the album, "Sometimes Love Is Letting Go" and "Free the Butterfly". The former tells a story of her past relationships with her parents and Len Tuckey; the latter is also the title of a self-help motivational album she made with Shirlie Roden.

== Cover art and title ==
The front cover photograph was created by Steve Payne which featured a photo of Quatro screaming whilst playing the bass guitar with graphics which made the cover look like she had shattered a window. The inside photographs and back cover photos were taken by Gered Mankowitz and Victory Tischler-Blue. Mankowitz had previously photographed Suzi for her early albums on RAK Records.

The title "Back to the Drive" is a play on her 1974 hit "Devil Gate Drive", which implied she was returning to her rock 'n' roll roots after the last few albums were more dependent on pop and soft rock.

== Track listing ==
No.	Title	Composer	Length
1.	"Back to the Drive"	Mike Chapman	4:31
2.	"15 Minutes of Fame"	Quatro, Andy Scott, Steve Grant	3:50
3.	"Duality"	Quatro, V. Tischler-Blue, Andy Scott, Steve Grant	5:00
4.	"I Don't Do Gentle"	Quatro, Andy Scott, Steve Grant	4:24
5.	"I'll Walk Through the Fire with You"	Quatro, Laura Tuckey, S. Roden, Andy Scott, Steve Grant	4:26
6.	"Wasted Moments"	Quatro, Andy Scott, Steve Grant	5:00
7.	"Rockin' in the Free World"	Neil Young	4:57
8.	"No Choice"	Quatro, Jean Roussel	5:30
9.	"Sometimes Love Is Letting Go"	Quatro, S. Roden	4:35
10.	"Dancing in the Wind"	Quatro, S. Roden	4:51
11.	"Free the Butterfly"	Quatro	4:55
12.	"Born Making Noise"	Quatro, Andy Scott, Steve Grant	4:45

Japanese version has two bonus tracks "Ambition" and "Why Do Rainbows Die".

== Critical reception ==
Whilst the album was warmly received by the critics and fans, it only reached number 78 in the Swiss album charts. Allmusic gave it a four-star rating. It was four years before Quatro recorded another album, In the Spotlight, released in August 2011 this time with Mike Chapman on production duties.

== Personnel ==
- Suzi Quatro - bass guitar, lead vocals
- Andy Scott - guitar, backing vocals, production
- Len Tuckey - guitar
- Steve Grant - various instruments, production
- Paul Jones - harmonica
- Andy Dowding - drums
- Ray Beavis - saxophone
- Toby Gucklhorn - trombone. (Note that "Gucklhorn" is misspelt "Guckelhorn" in this album's booklet. It is spelled correctly in the booklet for In the Spotlight.)
- Dick Hanson - trumpet
- Bruce Bisland - drums
- Reg Webb - piano, backing vocals
- Kate Webb - backing vocals
- Laura Tuckey - backing vocals, duet vocals on "I'll Walk Through the Fire with You"
- Shirlie Roden - backing vocals
