= Cyril (DJ) =

Australian DJ and record producer (born 1997)

- Cyril in 2025

Background information
- Born: Cyril Riley; August 22, 1997 (age 29); Lake Cargelligo, New South Wales, Australia
- Genres: House; electronic
- Occupations: DJ; record producer
- Years active: 2021–present

Cyril Riley (born August 22, 1997), known mononymously as Cyril (stylised as CYRIL), is an Australian DJ and record producer.

== Career ==
In 2021, he began occasionally uploading remixes of well-known songs to various platforms. Among other things, he remixed "Escape (The Piña Colada Song)" by Rupert Holmes and "Let Me Love You" by Mario as deep house tracks.

In 2023, Cyril created a remix of the song "Stumblin' In", originally performed by Chris Norman and Suzi Quatro. The song went viral on TikTok. Among other things, the players from Bayern Munich used the song for a TikTok video. The song then also reached the charts in Germany, Austria, Switzerland and the United Kingdom. Shortly afterwards, a remix of Disturbed's cover of the Simon & Garfunkel song "The Sound of Silence" was released, which also made the charts.

On 25 April 2025, Cyril released the single "Tears Dry Tonight", a collaboration with British singer-songwriter James Blunt.

In March 2026, Cyril released "That's Her" featuring Wiz Khalifa.

== Personal life ==
Riley grew up around Euabalong NSW, he went to high school in Lake Cargelligo born in Griffith central New South Wales. He has First Nations heritage. He lived in Townsville and Gunnedah for a short time in his teens. He can play guitar, piano and drums and began producing music in his late teens.

Reflecting on his early adulthood, Riley told The Music in 2024: "I went through a period of being homeless and a drug addict and whatnot, I went back home and I started working on the farm and did some fencing and cattle work and mustering. [But] I knew that wasn't for me because I was still wanting to produce music."

Riley was accepted into Charles Darwin University and relocated to Darwin where he continued DJing. As of 2024, Riley still lives in Darwin with his girlfriend and son.

== Discography ==
=== Extended plays ===
List of EPs, with selected details
Title	Details
From Down Under	Released: 9 August 2024; Label: Spinnin'
To the World	Released: 30 August 2024; Label: Spinnin'
This Isn't What You Think It Is	Released: 5 December 2025; Label: Spinnin'

=== Charted singles ===
List of charted singles, with selected chart positions and certifications, showing year released and album name
Title	Year	Peak chart positions										Certifications	Album or EP
Title	Year	AUS	AUT	BEL (WA)	FRA	GER	NL	NZ	POL Stream.	SWI	UK	Certifications	Album or EP
"Stumblin' In"	2023	15	2	8	20	2	1	11	9	7	68	ARIA: 5× Platinum; BPI: Gold; BRMA: 2× Platinum; BVMI: 3× Gold; IFPI AUT: 2× Platinum; IFPI SWI: 2× Platinum; RMNZ: 4× Platinum; SNEP: Diamond; ZPAV: Diamond	Non-album singles
"The Sound of Silence" (Cyril remix)(with Disturbed)	2024	—	35	29	3	44	2	— (Note: "The Sound of Silence" did not enter the Official New Zealand Music Chart, but peaked at number 23 on the New Zealand Hot Singles chart.)	7	7	47	ARIA: 2× Platinum; BRMA: Platinum; BVMI: Gold; IFPI SWI: Platinum; RMNZ: Gold	Non-album singles
"Fall at Your Feet" (with Dean Lewis)	2024	84	—	—	—	—	—	— (Note: "Fall at Your Feet" did not enter the NZ Top 40 Singles Chart, but peaked at number seven on the NZ Hot Singles Chart.)	—	—	—	ARIA: Gold; RMNZ: Gold	From Down Under
"True" (with Kita Alexander)	2024	94	—	—	—	—	—	— (Note: "True" did not enter the Official New Zealand Music Chart, but peaked at number 28 on the New Zealand Hot Singles chart.)	—	—	—		From Down Under
"Before I Let You Go" (featuring MarcLo)	2024	—	—	—	—	—	—	— (Note: "Before I Let You Go" did not enter the Official New Zealand Music Chart, but peaked at number 39 on the New Zealand Hot Singles chart.)	—	—	—		To the World
"World Gone Wild" (with Robin Schulz featuring Sam Martin)	2024	—	—	—	—	—	—	— (Note: "World Gone Wild" did not enter the Official New Zealand Music Chart, but peaked at number 28 on the New Zealand Hot Singles chart.)	—	—	—	SNEP: Gold	Non-album singles
"Still Into You" (with Maryjo)	2024	79	—	24	—	—	15	— (Note: "Still Into You" did not enter the Official New Zealand Music Chart, but peaked at number 10 on the New Zealand Hot Singles chart.)	19	—	—	ARIA: Platinum; RMNZ: Platinum; ZPAV: Platinum	Non-album singles
"Tears Dry Tonight" (with James Blunt)	2025	—	—	—	—	—	—	— (Note: "Tears Dry Tonight" did not enter the Official New Zealand Music Chart, but peaked at number 12 on the New Zealand Hot Singles chart.)	—	—	— (Note: "Tears Dry Tonight" did not enter the UK Singles Chart, but debuted at number 39 on the UK Singles Downloads Chart, and at number 40 on the UK Singles Sales Chart.)		Non-album singles
"There She Goes" (with Moonlght and the La's)	2025	— (Note: "Cannonball" did not enter the Australian top 100 Singles Chart, but peaked at number 18 on Australian Artist Chart.)	—	—	—	—	—	— (Note: "There She Goes" did not enter the Official New Zealand Music Chart, but peaked at number six on the New Zealand Hot Singles chart.)	—	—	—		Non-album singles
"Overdrive" (with Rome Fortune)	2025	—	—	—	—	—	—	— (Note: "Overdrive" did not enter the Official New Zealand Music Chart, but peaked at number 17 on the New Zealand Hot Singles chart.)	—	—	—		This Isn't What You Think It Is

== Awards and nominations ==
=== ARIA Music Awards ===
The ARIA Music Awards is an annual awards ceremony that recognises excellence, innovation, and achievement across all genres of Australian music. They commenced in 1987.

Year	Nominee / work	Award	Result	Ref.
2024	"Stumblin' In"	Best Dance/Electronic Release	Nominated	
2024	"Stumblin' In"	Song of the Year	Nominated	
2025	"Still Into You"	Song of the Year	Nominated	

=== Electronic Dance Music Awards ===
The Electronic Dance Music Awards are presented by iHeart Radio and commenced in 2022.

Year	Nominee / work	Award	Result	Ref.
2025	Cyril	Best New Artist	Nominated	
2025	"Still Into You" (with maryjo)	Pop Dance Anthem of the Year	Nominated	
2026	Cyril	Breakout Artist of the Year	Nominated	

=== Rolling Stone Australia Awards ===
The Rolling Stone Australia Awards are awarded annually in January or February by the Australian edition of Rolling Stone magazine for outstanding contributions to popular culture in the previous year.

Year	Nominee / work	Award	Result	Ref.
2025	"Stumblin' In"	Best Single	Shortlisted	
2025	Cyril	Best New Artist	Shortlisted	
