= Suzi ... and Other Four Letter Words =

Suzi...and Other Four Letter Words

Studio album by Suzi Quatro
- Released: September 1979
- Recorded: June 25, 1979 – July 2, 1979
- Studios: MCA/Whitney Studios, Glendale, California
- Genres: Rock; reggae fusion
- Length: 31:29
- Label: Rak
- Producer: Mike Chapman

Suzi Quatro chronology
If You Knew Suzi... (1978)	Suzi...and Other Four Letter Words (1979)	Rock Hard (1980)

Singles from Suzi ... and Other Four Letter Words
- 1. "She's in Love with You" Released: 1979; 2. "Mama's Boy" Released: 1980; 3. "I've Never Been in Love" Released: 1980

Suzi ... and Other Four Letter Words, released in 1979, is the sixth studio album by American singer-songwriter, bass guitar player, and actress Suzi Quatro. By August 2012 this was still Quatro's highest-charting album in Norway (at number 4) and her second-highest-charting album in the United States (at number 117).

The album contains three singles, all of which charted. "She's in Love with You", a number 1 hit in South Africa (where it topped the chart for 7 weeks), a top 20 hit in the United Kingdom, Austria, the Netherlands, Norway, and Switzerland, a top 40 hit in Australia and also a minor chart hit in New Zealand and the United States. "Mama's Boy" made chart appearances in both the United Kingdom and in the Netherlands and "I've Never Been in Love" charted in the United States as well as the United Kingdom.

== Background ==
This, Quatro's sixth studio LP, was released after she moved from the United States to Britain. It is her last studio album before she decided not to renew her contract with record producer Mickie Most's RAK Records label. (Instead she signed a contract with Dreamland Records, which had been set up by songwriters/producers Mike Chapman and Nicky Chinn).

== Critical reception ==
Professional ratings
Review scores
Source	Rating
AllMusic	2.5/5 stars
Smash Hits	7½10

Writing for Smash Hits in 1979, Red Starr described the album as "ten immediately accessible chunks of bouncy, straightforward pop-rock". In his retrospective review for AllMusic, Donald A. Guarisco sees Quatro as making "a strong return to her hard-rocking roots" with the album. Example "bracing rocker" tracks are "I've Never Been in Love" and "She's in Love with You". These are "judiciously balanced with a string of tuneful, keyboard-based mid-tempo tunes" such as "Hollywood" and the "pop-inflected reggae groove" of "Four Letter Words". Guarisco feels that the downside of the album is that "many of the songs recycle the same double-time backbeat" and singles out "You Are My Lover" whose melody "is minimalist to the point of being repetitive". He concludes that:

"Despite these minor problems, Suzi...and Other Four Letter Words remains a solid slab of rock that is guaranteed to please the Suzi Quatro fanbase."

== Commercial performance ==
By August 2012 Suzi...and Other Four Letter Words (1979) was still Quatro's highest-charting album in Norway, beating both Quatro (1974), which reached number 5, and Suzi Quatro (1973), which reached number 6. It was also her second-highest-charting album in the United States, behind If You Knew Suzi... (1978), which reached number 37 in The Billboard 200.

== Track listing ==
1. "I've Never Been in Love" (Melissa A. Connell) – 3:02
2. "Mind Demons" (Suzi Quatro, Len Tuckey) – 2:25
3. "She's in Love with You" (Mike Chapman, Nicky Chinn) – 3:32
4. "Hollywood" (Quatro, Tuckey) – 2:57
5. "Four Letter Words" (Chapman, Chinn) – 3:27
6. "Mama's Boy" (Quatro, Tuckey) – 3:35
7. "Starlight Lady" (Quatro, Tuckey) – 3:36
8. "You Are My Lover" (Jack Lee) – 3:12
9. "Space Cadets" (Quatro, Tuckey) – 4:18
10. "Love Hurts" (Quatro, Tuckey) – 2:45

== Personnel ==
- Suzi Quatro – lead vocals, bass guitar, writer
- Len Tuckey – lead guitar, rhythm guitar, acoustic guitar, backing vocals, writer
- Jamie Crompton – guitar, backing vocals
- Bill Hurd – keyboard, backing vocals
- Dave Neal – drums

Technical

- Dave Tickle – engineer
- Peter Coleman – engineer
- Glenn Ross – art direction
- Norman Seeff – photography
- Steve Hall – mastering
- Nicky Chinn – writer
- Mike Chapman – producer, writer

== Charts ==
=== Album ===
Chart	Peak position
Australian Albums (Kent Music Report)	47
Norwegian Albums (VG-lista)	4
Swedish Albums (Sverigetopplistan)	36

=== Singles ===
"She's in Love with You" / "Space Cadets" (or "Starlight Lady" in the US)

Chart	Peak position
Austria (Ö3 Austria Top 40)	4
Netherlands (Single Top 100)	6
New Zealand (Recorded Music NZ)	24
Norway (VG-lista)	10
Switzerland (Schweizer Hitparade)	6
UK Singles (Official Charts)	11
US Billboard Hot 100	41

"Mama's Boy" / "Mind Demons" (1980 single)

Chart	Peak position
Netherlands (Single Top 100)	43
Germany (GfK)	19
UK Singles (Official Charts)	34

"I've Never Been in Love" / "Starlight Lady" (or "Space Cadets" in the US) (1980 single)

Chart	Peak position
UK Singles (Official Charts)	56
US Billboard Hot 100	44

== Certifications ==
Certifications and sales for Suzi ... and Other Four Letter Words
Region	Certification	Certified units/sales
Canada (Music Canada)	Gold	50,000^{^}
^{^} Shipments figures based on certification alone.
