= Main Attraction (album) =

Studio album by Suzi Quatro
- Released: November 1982
- Recorded: December 1981 – March 1982
- Studio: The Studio Toppersfield (Essex, England)
- Genre: Rock; new wave
- Length: 34:38
- Label: Polydor
- Producer: Chris Andrews; Len Tuckey

Suzi Quatro chronology
Rock Hard (1980)	Main Attraction (1982)	Annie Get Your Gun – 1986 London Cast (1986)

Singles from Main Attraction
- 1. "Heart of Stone" Released: 1982; 2. "Main Attraction" Released: 1983; 3. "Remote Control" Released: 1983

Professional ratings
Review scores
Source	Rating
AllMusic	2/5 stars
Record Mirror	2/5 stars

Main Attraction is the eighth studio album by American rock musician Suzi Quatro, released in November 1982, her first and only release by Polydor Records. The album was recorded over a period of four months at The Studio Toppersfield, in Essex, England with the sessions starting in late 1981, and ending in early 1982. The album is notably Quatro's only studio album not to contain any cover versions of songs by other artists, and she had a hand in composing each track, with the exception of the sixth track "Two Miles Out of Georgia", which was solely written by Chris Andrews. The album was her last recording of original material for four years, until she released Annie Get Your Gun – 1986 London Cast, and it was her last studio album of the 1980s and her last studio album for eight years, until she released Oh, Suzi Q., in 1990.

It was released at the height of the popularity of the new wave music movement. "Heart of Stone" received some airplay on Album-oriented rock radio, and was released as a lead single from the album and became a moderate success, peaking at number 60 on the UK charts. And the title track was also released as a single, but unlike the aforementioned single it failed to chart. The album was received negatively by the majority of music critics, with most of the criticism being directed towards its musical direction being too commercial from her hard rock roots. The album went largely unnoticed by the public, being a commercial disappointment, and even missed the album charts worldwide (her first studio album to do so).

The album was re-released in 2008, and was the first of several remastered reissues by Cherry Red Records on Compact Disc. It contained the single version of "Heart of Stone" as a bonus track. Cherry Red have since released other Quatro remasters, as well as releasing her 2011 studio album, In the Spotlight.

== Critical reception ==
In a retrospective review for AllMusic, critic Jim Allen wrote of the album "a few tracks are melodic, acoustic-based, Juice Newton-sounding tunes; a few explore new wave/electro-dance production touches; and for the faithful, there are a couple of rockers in the classic Quatro mode." And they added that "[the album is] Clearly a portrait of an artist in motion."

== Track listing ==
All tracks are written by Suzi Quatro and Len Tuckey, except where noted.

Side one
No.	Title	Writer(s)	Length
1.	"Heart of Stone"	Chris Andrews; Suzi Quatro	4:07
2.	"Cheap Shot"		3:39
3.	"She Knows"		3:11
4.	"Main Attraction"	Andrews; Quatro	3:15
5.	"Two Miles Out of Georgia"	Andrews	3:30

Side two
No.	Title	Writer(s)	Length
6.	"Candy Man"	Andrews; Quatro	3:13
7.	"Remote Control"		3:21
8.	"Fantasy in Stereo"	Andrews; Quatro	3:11
9.	"Transparent"		3:18
10.	"Oh Baby"		3:53
Total length:			34:38

Bonus track on Cherry Red reissue
No.	Title	Length
11.	"Heart of Stone" (Single Version)	3:25

== Personnel ==
Credits are adapted from the album's liner notes.

- Suzi Quatro – lead vocals, bass guitar, backing vocals
- Len Tuckey – acoustic guitar, electric guitar, guitar synthesizer, backing vocals, producer
- Dave Neal – drums, percussion
- Chris Andrews – keyboards, backing vocals, producer
- Jimmy Martin – steel guitar on "Two Miles Out of Georgia"
- Wendy Roberts – backing vocals on "Heart of Stone"
