= Your Mamma Won't Like Me =

Studio album by Suzi Quatro
- Released: 1 May 1975
- Studios: Audio International, London
- Genres: Hard rock; pop rock; funk rock
- Length: 34:00
- Label: Rak
- Producers: Mike Chapman; Nicky Chinn

Suzi Quatro chronology
Quatro (1974)	Your Mamma Won't Like Me (1975)	Aggro-Phobia (1976)

Singles from Your Mamma Won't Like Me
- 1. "Your Mamma Won't Like Me" Released: 31 January 1975; 2. "I Bit Off More Than I Could Chew" Released: 4 April 1975; 3. "Michael" Released: 1 May 1975

Professional ratings
Review scores
Source	Rating
Christgau's Record Guide	B−

Your Mamma Won't Like Me is the third studio album by Suzi Quatro. Released in May 1975 by record label Rak in most countries, in the US the album was released through Arista Records, the label that had recently succeeded Bell Records which distributed Quatro's first two previous releases in that country. The LP marked a change in the hard rock sound from the singer's previous albums Suzi Quatro and Quatro, instead displaying a more funk-oriented rock sound.

The title track reached No. 31 on the UK singles chart in February 1975. The album's second single, "I Bit off More Than I Could Chew", also reached the charts, peaking at 54 in the UK charts. "Michael" also had limited promotion, being released as a single in some territories, including Australia where the song reached the top 100. The album reached the charts in several territories, reaching the top 50 in Germany, Norway and New Zealand, as well as making an appearance in the US charts, peaking at 146.

The album includes a cover of Little Willie John's "Fever". This was the last LP to include Alistair Mackenzie as keyboard player, with Mike Deacon replacing him thereafter. In 2012, the album was re-issued and digitally remastered by 7T's Records in the UK, along with her other studio releases. This particular re-issue contains bonus tracks and some rare pictures.

== Tour ==
This is the album Quatro was promoting during her first UK headline tour, "RAK Rocks Britain", where she headlined a nine-date tour with the Arrows and Cozy Powell's Hammer.

== Track listing ==
Your Mamma Won't Like Me track listing
No.	Title	Writer(s)	Length
1.	"I Bit Off More Than I Could Chew"	Mike Chapman, Nicky Chinn	3:44
2.	"Strip Me"	Mike Chapman, Nicky Chinn	3:10
3.	"Paralysed"	Suzi Quatro, Len Tuckey	2:44
4.	"Prisoner of Your Imagination"	Suzi Quatro, Len Tuckey	4:51
5.	"Your Mamma Won't Like Me"	Mike Chapman, Nicky Chinn	3:59
6.	"Can't Trust Love"	Suzi Quatro, Len Tuckey	3:42
7.	"New Day Woman"	Suzi Quatro, Len Tuckey	3:37
8.	"Fever"	Eddie Cooley, John Davenport	3:39
9.	"You Can Make Me Want You"	Suzi Quatro, Len Tuckey	3:43
10.	"Michael"	Suzi Quatro, Len Tuckey	3:31

== Personnel ==
- Suzi Quatro – lead vocals, bass guitar, writer
- Len Tuckey – lead guitar, backing vocals, writer
- Dave Neal – drums, backing vocals
- Alistair Mackenzie – keyboards, backing vocals
- Bud Beadle – saxophone
- Chris Mercer – saxophone
- Mick Eve – saxophone
- Steve Gregory – saxophone
- Ron Carthy – trumpet
- Pete Coleman – engineer
- Mike Chapman – producer, writer
- Nicky Chinn – producer, writer

== Charts ==
Chart performance for Your Mamma Won't Like Me
Chart (1975)	Peak position
Australian Albums (Kent Music Report)	11
German Albums (Offizielle Top 100)	42
New Zealand Albums (RMNZ)	16
Norwegian Albums (VG-lista)	21
US Billboard 200	146
