= If You Can't Give Me Love =

Single by Suzi Quatro

from the album If You Knew Suzi...
- B-side: "Cream Dream" (UK); "Non-Citizen" (US)
- Released: March 1978 (UK); May 1979 (US)
- Genre: Soft rock, bubblegum pop
- Label: RSO
- Songwriters: Mike Chapman, Nicky Chinn

Suzi Quatro singles chronology
"Roxy Roller" (1977)	"If You Can't Give Me Love" (1978)	"The Race Is On" (1978)

"If You Can't Give Me Love" is a 1978 song written by Mike Chapman and Nicky Chinn, performed by Suzi Quatro from her album If You Knew Suzi.... It became an international hit in the spring of the year, reaching number four in the United Kingdom and number five in Germany. It also reached the Top 10 in Australia.

"If You Can't Give Me Love" was released a year later in North America, it was less successful in the U.S. at number 45. It was the follow-up to her bigger hit "Stumblin' In," which reached number four. This charting was the reverse of the songs' charting in the United Kingdom, where "If You Can't Give Me Love" reached number four and "Stumblin' In," released later, narrowly missed the Top 40.

== Chart history ==
=== Weekly charts ===
Chart (1978–79)	Peak position
Australia (Kent Music Report)	10
Canada RPM Top Singles	55
Germany	5
Ireland (IRMA)	2
New Zealand (RIANZ)	14
South Africa (Springbok)	3
UK	4
U.S. Billboard Hot 100	45
U.S. Cash Box Top 100	53

=== Year-end charts ===
Chart (1978)	Rank
Australia (Kent Music Report)	45
UK	48
