= Tonight I Could Fall in Love =

Single by Suzi Quatro
- B-side: "Good Girl (Looking for a Bad Time)"
- Released: July 1985
- Genre: Pop
- Length: 3:56
- Label: RAK Records
- Songwriter: Richard Gower
- Producer: Mickie Most

Suzi Quatro singles chronology
"I Go Wild" (1984)	"Tonight I Could Fall in Love" (1985)	"Heroes" (1986)

"Tonight I Could Fall in Love" is a song by American singer-songwriter Suzi Quatro, released by RAK Records as a non-album single in 1985. The song was written by Richard Gower and produced by Mickie Most. The song reached number 140 in the UK Singles Chart.

== Background ==
After the limited commercial success of her 1982 album Main Attraction, Quatro was left without a record deal. During 1984, Quatro returned to London to record a new album, after convincing Len Tuckey, her husband and collaborator, that they should go ahead with recording an album and attempt to gain record company interest once it was completed. They booked RAK Studios for two weeks, with Quatro writing and Tuckey producing. Every track recorded was an original except for "Oh Suzi Q" which was written by Dale Hawkins. Quatro wrote one song about her daughter Laura, who was born in 1982, titled "Everything I Ever Wanted," and other songs recorded during the sessions were "Pardon Me," "There She Goes," "I'm a Rocker," "Strange Encounters," Comes the Night," "Starry Night," Good Girl Looking for a Bad Time," (which was written for nanny Michelle), "Secret Hideaway" and "Just Like Mama," the latter which was from Quatro's first tour with Slade in 1972. After the recording sessions, Quatro and Tuckey failed to secure a deal for the album and it remained unreleased until 1998 when it came out on the Connoisseur Collection label as Unreleased Emotion.

During the RAK studio sessions, Mickie Most would pop in and out assisting with the mixes, and it was decided for Quatro and Most to do a couple of songs together. "Tonight I Could Fall in Love" would recorded and released as a single, with "Good Girl (Looking for a Bad Time)" as the B-side.

== Release ==
"Tonight I Could Fall in Love" was released by RAK Records in the UK, the Netherlands and Germany. The B-side "Good Girl (Looking for a Bad Time)" was written by Quatro and Tuckey. The 12-inch single featured an extended six-minute version of "Tonight I Could Fall in Love". The photography for the sleeve was taken by Paul Forrester, with Quatro's hair and make-up done by Clancy Valentina. Following its original release as a non-album single, the song would later appear as a bonus track on the 2012 CD re-issue of Unreleased Emotion.

== Critical reception ==
In a review of Unreleased Emotion, Lisa Torem of Penny Black Music described the song as a "wonderful ballad". She also noted the song's B-side "Good Girl (Looking for a Bad Time)" features "Tuckey's swashbuckling lead and Suzi's saucy, school-of-hard-knocks attitude". In a 2022 review of The Albums 1980-86, Ian Canty of Louder Than War described it as a "chilly electro slowie" that, like Quatro's previous 1984 single "I Go Wild", "come[s] across as not quite strong enough to make an impact as [a] 45".

== Track listing ==
7-inch single

1. "Tonight I Could Fall in Love" - 3:56
2. "Good Girl (Looking for a Bad Time)" - 3:33

12-inch single

1. "Tonight I Could Fall in Love" (Extended Mix) - 6:09
2. "Good Girl (Looking for a Bad Time)" - 3:33

== Personnel ==
- Suzi Quatro - Lead Vocals
- Mickie Most - Producer
- Paul Forrester - Photography
- Clancy Valentina - Hair and Make-Up
- Writer of "Tonight I Could Fall in Love" - Richard Gower
- Writer of "Good Girl (Looking for a Bad Time)" - Suzi Quatro, Len Tuckey

== Charts ==
Chart (1985)	Peak position
UK Singles Chart	140
