= Aggro-Phobia =

Studio album by Suzi Quatro
- Released: January 1977
- Recorded: Late 1976
- Studio: Château Du Regarde, Oise, France with the RAK Mobile
- Genre: Rock; hard rock
- Length: 32:05
- Label: Rak
- Producer: Mike Chapman; Mickie Most

Suzi Quatro chronology
Your Mamma Won't Like Me (1975)	Aggro-Phobia (1977)	If You Knew Suzi... (1978)

Singles from Aggro-Phobia
- 1. "Tear Me Apart" Released: 1977; 2. "Make Me Smile (Come Up and See Me)" Released: 1977

Aggro-Phobia is the fourth studio album by Suzi Quatro, recorded in the autumn of 1976. It is the only one of her albums to be co-produced by Mickie Most.

The song "Tear Me Apart" reached No. 27 on the UK Singles Chart in October 1977. Writing for Bomp!, music critic Ken Barnes called it "excellent" and "superior to [her] earlier hits".

== Track listing ==
1. "Heartbreak Hotel" (Elvis Presley, Mae Boren Axton, Tommy Durden) – 3:48
2. "Don't Break My Heart" (Suzi Quatro, Len Tuckey) – 2:53
3. "Make Me Smile (Come Up and See Me)" (Steve Harley) – 3:43
4. "What's It Like to Be Loved" (Quatro, Tuckey) – 3:13
5. "Tear Me Apart" (Mike Chapman, Nicky Chinn) – 2:59
6. "The Honky Tonk Downstairs" (Dallas Frazier) – 3:00
7. "Half as Much as Me" (Quatro, Tuckey) – 4:12
8. "Close the Door" (Quatro, Tuckey) – 3:47
9. "American Lady" (Quatro, Tuckey) – 3:41
10. "Wake Up Little Susie" (Felice and Boudleaux Bryant) – 2:49

== Personnel ==
- Suzi Quatro – lead vocals, bass guitar, writer
- Len Tuckey – lead guitar, backing vocals, writer
- Dave Neal – drums, backing vocals
- Mike Deacon – keyboards, backing vocals
- Mike Chapman – producer, writer
- Nicky Chinn – writer
- Mickie Most – producer

== Charts ==
Chart performance for Aggro-Phobia
Chart (1977)	Peak position
Australian Albums (Kent Music Report)	84
