= If You Knew Suzi... =

Studio album by Suzi Quatro
- Released: December 1, 1978
- Recorded: December 17, 1977 – September 1978
- Studios: EMI Electrola, Cologne; MCA/Whitney Recording Studios, Glendale, California; mixed at Whitney Recording Studios, Glendale and Decca Studios, Paris
- Genres: Rock; pop rock; acoustic
- Length: 36:39
- Label: RAK
- Producer: Mike Chapman

Suzi Quatro chronology
Aggro-Phobia (1977)	If You Knew Suzi... (1978)	Suzi ... and Other Four Letter Words (1979)

Singles from If You Knew Suzi...
- 1. "If You Can't Give Me Love" Released: 1978; 2. "Stumblin' In" Released: 1978; 3. "The Race Is On" Released: 1979; 4. "Don't Change My Luck" Released: 1979

If You Knew Suzi... is the fifth studio album by American singer Suzi Quatro, released on December 1, 1978, but with a 1979 copyright date. By August 2012 this was still Quatro's highest-charting album in the United States (it peaked at number 37 on the Billboard 200). The album also yielded Quatro's biggest US single hit, a duet with Chris Norman named "Stumblin' In" (which reached number 4 on both the Billboard Hot 100 and the Billboard Adult Contemporary charts. It also had an advertising billboard on Sunset Boulevard.

The credits show the album to be a multinational production: tracks were recorded in Cologne (Germany), Paris (France), and Glendale (California). It was then mixed in California and mastered in London to be distributed by a company based in New York City.

== Critical reception ==
Professional ratings
Review scores
Source	Rating
AllMusic	3/5 stars
Christgau's Record Guide	C+

The Associated Press wrote that, "although her new album is straight rock 'n' roll, 'Stumblin' In' is a relaxed-sounding love song, hardly representative of the have a good time, scream and shout rock Miss Quatro has been churning out all these years."

== Track listing ==
1. "Don't Change My Luck" (Chinn, Chapman) – 3:43
2. "Tired of Waiting" (Ray Davies) – 3:29
3. "Suicide" (Quatro, Len Tuckey) – 4:05
4. "Evie" (Harry Vanda, George Young) – 4:35
5. "The Race Is On" (Chinn, Chapman) – 4:02
6. "If You Can't Give Me Love" (Nicky Chinn, Mike Chapman) – 3:53
7. "Breakdown" (Tom Petty) – 3:24
8. "Non-Citizen" (Quatro, Tuckey) – 3:17
9. "Rock and Roll, Hoochie Koo" (Rick Derringer) – 3:24
10. "Wiser Than You" (Quatro, Tuckey) – 3:53

=== Notes ===
The US and Canadian pressing of the album omitted the Vanda and Young-penned song "Evie" and included "Stumblin' In" in its replacement. When If You Knew Suzi... was re-released as a "two-fer" with the Suzi ... and Other Four Letter Words album, both "Evie" and "Stumblin' In" were included.

== Personnel ==
- Mike Chapman – producer, writer
- Nicky Chinn – writer
- Mike Deacon – keyboards, piano, synthesizer, backing vocals
- Dave Neal – drums, percussion, backing vocals
- Suzi Quatro – lead vocals, backing vocals, bass guitar, congas, writer
- Len Tuckey – lead and rhythm guitar, backing vocals, writer

== Charts ==
Chart performance for If You Knew Suzi...
Chart (1978)	Peak position
Australian Albums (Kent Music Report)	36
Canada Top Albums/CDs (RPM)	31
Swedish Albums (Sverigetopplistan)	24
US Billboard 200	37

== Certifications ==
Certifications and sales for If You Knew Suzi
Region	Certification	Certified units/sales
Canada (Music Canada)	Platinum	100,000^{^}
^{^} Shipments figures based on certification alone.
