= Free the Butterfly =

Studio album by Suzi Quatro and Shirlie Roden
- Released: 1999
- Genre: Self-help
- Label: QED Productions

Suzi Quatro and Shirlie Roden chronology
Unreleased Emotion (1998)	Free the Butterfly (1999)	Back to the Drive (2006)

Free the Butterfly is an "inner experience" self-help album by Suzi Quatro and Shirlie Roden, which uses music and movement as a healing therapy. The pair have appeared together at workshops and Mind, Body & Spirit festivals. Speaking of Roden, Quatro said: "She's a sound healer and she asked me to do some workshops with her, which I did, and it was quite an interesting experience." When asked if she found the exercise helpful in her own life, Quatro said: "Definitely, I think that, whenever you do something like that, you realize that most people really have the same kind of problems.", adding "I feel I have to do this, I have to give something back". The work is based on the idea of the "School of Life".

The listing for the album on the official Suzi Quatro website describes it as follows:

This is a unique double CD, specially created, written and performed by Suzi and Shirlie, to help you connect with your inner self and discover the Lessons of your Life. Based on the idea of the School of Life, this CD works with the elements of Water, Air, Fire, Earth, Wood, Stone and Gold in the form of seven separate songs. Together with a guided narration by Suzi or Shirlie, each element allows the listener to discover and unearth their feelings and emotional truth. Suzi and Shirlie lead you with words, music, sound and movement to let you lose your inhibitions, express your truth and emotions, and become your own alchemist to transform your shadow into pure gold.

Quatro and Roden have worked together many times over the years. Prior to this album, they co-wrote the 1991 "Tallulah Who?" musical, with Quatro performing the title role. Boden also sang backing vocals and co-wrote some songs for Quatro's 2006 album Back to the Drive.

== Track listing ==
Disc One

1. "Introductions"
2. "Water"
3. "Air"
4. "Fire"

Disc Two

1. "Earth"
2. "Wood"
3. "Stone"
4. "Gold"
