= Suzi Quatro (album) =

Studio album by Suzi Quatro
- Released: October 1973
- Recorded: 1973
- Studios: Audio International Studio, London
- Genre: Glam rock
- Length: 46:07
- Label: Rak
- Producers: Mike Chapman; Nicky Chinn

Suzi Quatro chronology
Suzi Quatro (1973)	Quatro (1974)

Singles from Suzi Quatro
- 1. "Can the Can" Released: April 27, 1973; 2. "48 Crash" Released: July 20, 1973; 3. "All Shook Up" Released: 1974 (US only)

Professional ratings
Review scores
Source	Rating
AllMusic	4.5/5 stars
Christgau's Record Guide	B
Otago Daily Times	favourable

Suzi Quatro is the debut solo studio album by the American singer-songwriter and bass guitarist of the same name. The LP was originally released in October 1973, by the record label Rak in most territories. The album was released under Bell Records in the United States and Canada, EMI Records in Japan, and Columbia Records in some European countries. It was titled Can the Can in Australia.

The album was a critical and commercial success, achieving international popularity upon its release, reaching the top 50 in the charts in several territories, peaking at number 32 in the UK Albums Chart, number 4 in Germany, number 5 in the Netherlands, and number 2 in Australia. The LP also achieved minor success in the United States, entering the top 150 in the charts there. The single "Can the Can", which was included on the album in most countries, became Quatro's most successful hit, reaching number one in the charts in several European countries and Australia, and had modest success in the US, peaking at 56 in the charts in 1976 when it was re-released in that country a few years later. The album also spawned her second single "48 Crash" which also achieved commercial success, reaching the top ten in several countries, including the UK where it went to number 3.

The Elvis Presley cover "All Shook Up" was given a limited release as a single in the United States, peaking at number 85 on the Billboard Hot 100. Quatro would later claim that Presley himself contacted her and told her that her cover of his song was "the best since [his] own".

== Critical reception ==
Village Voice critic Robert Christgau said, "nothing in her own songwriting equals the one-riff rock of the two Chapman-Chinn singles, especially "48 Crash," and the last time I got off on someone dressed entirely in leather was before John Kay started repeating himself." In a retrospective review for AllMusic, Dave Thompson gave the album four and half stars and wrote that "Suzi Quatro remains one of the most nakedly sexual albums of the entire glam rock epoch -- and one of the hottest debuts of the decade."

== Track listing ==
=== UK original track listing ===
All tracks composed by Suzi Quatro and Len Tuckey, except where indicated.

Side one

1. "48 Crash" (Mike Chapman, Nicky Chinn) – 3:54
2. "Glycerine Queen" – 3:47
3. "Shine My Machine" – 3:49
4. "Official Suburbian Superman" – 3:05
5. "I Wanna Be Your Man" (John Lennon, Paul McCartney) – 3:09
6. "Primitive Love" (Mike Chapman, Nicky Chinn) – 4:13

Side two

1. "All Shook Up" (Otis Blackwell, Elvis Presley) – 3:48
2. "Sticks & Stones" – 3:41
3. "Skin Tight Skin" – 4:21
4. "Get Back Mamma" (Quatro) – 5:52
5. "Rockin' Moonbeam" – 2:55
6. "Shakin' All Over" (Johnny Kidd) – 3:33

=== Notes ===
- Most releases of the album outside of the UK included "Can the Can"; however, later pressings in the UK would later include "Can the Can" also.
- "Rockin' Moonbeam" was not included on the album in some countries, including the US and Canadian pressings, which omitted both "Rockin' Moonbeam" and "Get Back Mamma" and included "Can the Can" in their place.
- Australia released the album under the Can the Can title, which appears on the cover written above Len Tuckey, but was otherwise identical to the version pictured above.

== Personnel ==
- Suzi Quatro – bass, lead vocals
- Len Tuckey – guitars, backing vocals, slide guitar
- Alastair McKenzie – piano, backing vocals, electric piano, Mellotron
- Dave Neal – drums, backing vocals

=== Production ===
- Engineer – Pete Coleman
- Mastering – Chris Blair
- Producer – Mike Chapman, Nicky Chinn
- Cover photography – Gered Mankowitz

=== Production notes ===
- Produced at Audio International Studio, London
- Mastered at EMI Studios, Abbey Road

== Charts ==
=== Weekly charts ===
Weekly chart performance for Suzi Quatro
Chart (1973–1974)	Peak position
Australian Albums (Kent Music Report)	2
Austrian Albums (Ö3 Austria)	5
German Albums (Offizielle Top 100)	4
Norwegian Albums (VG-lista)	6
UK Albums (Official Charts)	32

=== Year-end charts ===
Year-end chart performance for Suzi Quatro
Chart (1974)	Position
Australian Albums (Kent Music Report)	5
German Albums (Offizielle Top 100)	3

== Certifications ==
Certifications for Suzi Quatro
Region	Certification	Certified units/sales
Finland (Musiikkituottajat)	Gold	20,000
