= Heart of Stone (Suzi Quatro song) =

Single by Suzi Quatro

from the album Main Attraction
- B-side: "Remote Control"
- Released: October 1982
- Genre: Rock; country rock
- Length: 4:07
- Label: Polydor
- Songwriters: Chris Andrews; Suzi Quatro
- Producers: Chris Andrews; Len Tuckey

Suzi Quatro singles chronology
"Lipstick" (1981)	"Heart of Stone" (1982)	"Down at the Superstore" (1983)

"Heart of Stone" is the twenty-sixth solo single by the American rock singer-songwriter and bass guitarist Suzi Quatro. It was originally released in October 1982 as the lead single from her eighth studio album, Main Attraction, only in the UK and Spain, and was also her first single release by the record label, Polydor. It was co-written by Quatro and keyboardist Chris Andrews, the latter of whom also co-produced it. The single release features the song "Remote Control" as the B-side, which also appeared on the Main Attraction album.

The song was recorded at The Studio Toppersfield, in Essex, England, while the mixing of the track was finished at The Townhouse, in London.

== Background ==
The song is notably Quatro's last single to reach the top 75 in the UK. It is also one of only two of Quatro's self composed singles to chart, the other being "Mamma's Boy" in 1980. Despite several TV appearances and some radio airplay Heart of Stone failed to climb no higher than #60 in the United Kingdom, and stayed in the charts for three weeks.

== Compilation appearances ==
As well as the song's single release, it has featured on a few compilation albums released by Quatro. It was initially included on The Best Of Suzi Quatro, in 1984. The song was then included on the 1991 compilation, Rock Hard. It was also included on the 4-disc box set The Girl From Detroit City.

== Track listing ==
7" single (POSP 477)

1. "Heart of Stone"
2. "Remote Control"
