= Quatro (album) =

Studio album by Suzi Quatro
- Released: October 1974
- Recorded: 1974
- Studios: Audio International Studios, London
- Length: 42:08
- Label: RAK
- Producers: Mike Chapman; Nicky Chinn

Suzi Quatro chronology
Suzi Quatro (1973)	Quatro (1974)	Your Mamma Won't Like Me (1975)

Singles from Quatro
- 1. "Devil Gate Drive" Released: February 10, 1974; 2. "Too Big" Released: June 21, 1974; 3. "The Wild One" Released: November 1, 1974

Professional ratings
Review scores
Source	Rating
AllMusic	1.5/5 stars
Christgau's Record Guide	B−
Džuboks	(mixed)

Quatro is Suzi Quatro's second album, released in October 1974 by Rak Records as SRAK 509, with the exceptions of the United States and Canada (where the album was released by Bell Records), Japan (EMI Records) and several territories in Europe (Columbia Records).

The album achieved success in several territories, topping the Australian chart and remaining on that chart for six weeks. It also entered the US charts, reaching the top 150. "Devil Gate Drive" became a major hit, reaching the No. 1 spot in the UK and Australian charts, becoming her second number one in both countries. The singles "The Wild One" and "Too Big" also achieved commercial success, with the former reaching the top 10 in both the UK and in Australia, and the latter reaching the top 20 in those same territories.

"The Wild One" was featured in Floria Sigismondi's 2010 film The Runaways, a coming-of-age film/biopic about Cherie Currie (portrayed by Dakota Fanning) and the 1970s all-girl rock band the Runaways. (The film was inspired by, and loosely based on, Currie's 1989 memoir Neon Angel). Suzi Quatro was a major influence both musically and personally for the Runaways and especially for Joan Jett, so the film makes several references to her.

== Singles ==
The album contained three songs that were major hits on the UK Singles Chart. "Devil Gate Drive" reached No. 1 in February 1974; "Too Big" rose to No. 14 in June; and "The Wild One" reached No. 7 in November.

== Track listing ==
=== UK track listing ===
Side one
No.	Title	Writer(s)	Length
1.	"The Wild One"	Mike Chapman, Nicky Chinn	3:47
2.	"Keep A-Knockin'"	Richard Penniman	3:14
3.	"Too Big"	Chapman, Chinn	3:22
4.	"Klondyke Kate"	Suzi Quatro, Len Tuckey	3:30
5.	"Savage Silk"	Chapman, Chinn	3:36
6.	"Move It"	Ian Samwell	3:38

Side two
No.	Title	Writer(s)	Length
1.	"Hit the Road Jack"	Percy Mayfield	3:57
2.	"Trouble"	Jerry Leiber, Mike Stoller	3:46
3.	"Cat Size"	Quatro, Tuckey	4:37
4.	"Shot of Rhythm and Blues"	Terry Thompson	4:53
5.	"Friday"	Quatro, Tuckey	3:52

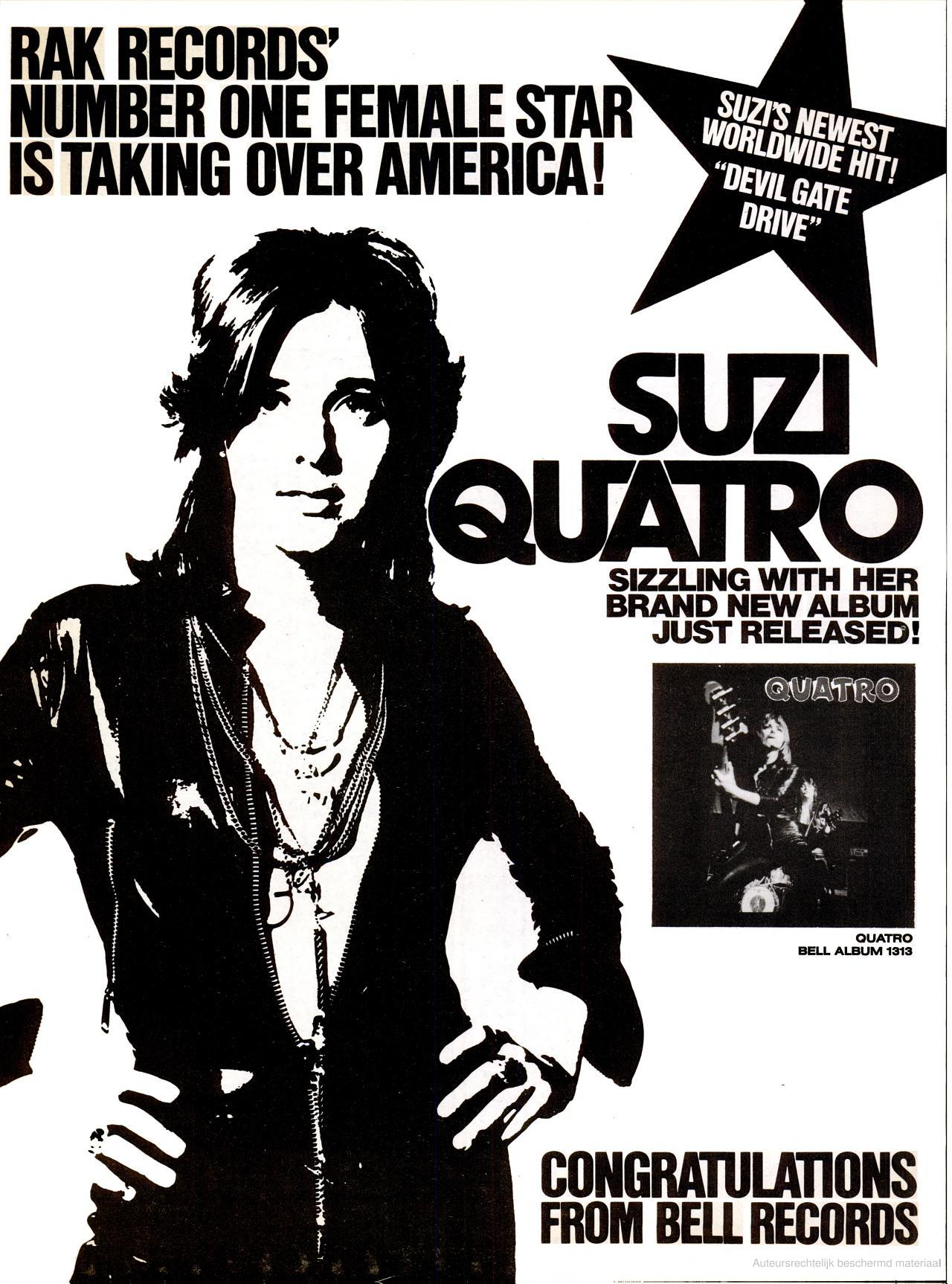

=== Notes ===
- "Devil Gate Drive" was included on the album in most countries but was omitted from the UK first pressing. "Friday" was omitted from the original US release of the album.
- In some territories including the UK and US, the album contained a slow arrangement of "The Wild One" in replacement of the single version on the album. The fast rock version of the song was not made available in the US upon its initial release and remained unacknowledged in that region until several compilations were released years later. Both versions of the song were arranged by Phil Dennys.

== Personnel ==
- Suzi Quatro – lead vocals, bass guitar
- Len Tuckey – guitar, backing vocals
- Alastair McKenzie – keyboards, backing vocals
- Dave Neal – drums, backing vocals

== Charts ==
=== Weekly charts ===
Weekly chart performance for Quatro
Chart (1974–1975)	Peak position
Australian Albums (Kent Music Report)	1
German Albums (Offizielle Top 100)	15
New Zealand Albums (RMNZ)	16
Norwegian Albums (VG-lista)	5
US Billboard 200	126

=== Year-end charts ===
1974 year-end chart performance for Quatro
Chart (1974)	Position
Australian Albums (Kent Music Report)	11

1975 year-end chart performance for Quatro
Chart (1975)	Position
Australian Albums (Kent Music Report)	15
German Albums (Offizielle Top 100)	44
