= What Goes Around – Greatest & Latest =

Studio album by Suzi Quatro
- Released: 1995
- Recorded: September – October 1995
- Genre: Hard rock
- Length: 1:12:51
- Label: CMC International

Suzi Quatro chronology
Oh, Suzi Q. (1990)	What Goes Around – Greatest & Latest (1995)	Unreleased Emotion (1998)

What Goes Around – Greatest & Latest is the eleventh studio album by American rock singer-songwriter and bassist Suzi Quatro, released in 1995 by CMC International Records. It features re-recordings of her original recordings, spanning from the 1970s and features four new tracks, one a cover version of Bruce Springsteen's song "Born to Run".

== Critical reception ==
Professional ratings
Review scores
Source	Rating
AllMusic	3/5 stars

Reviewing for AllMusic, critic Dave Thompson wrote of the album "One of those odd collections that flags its contents with a vague "greatest and latest" subtitle, but it's only when you get it home that you really discover what you have." adding that "her latest band does have a great time trying to recapture the manic energy of the original recordings, which may or may not do it for the casual listener."

== Track listing ==
All songs written and composed by Mike Chapman and Nicky Chinn, except where noted.

1. "Devil Gate Drive"
2. "The Wild One"
3. "The Race Is On"
4. "What Goes Around" (Suzi Quatro)
5. "Can the Can"
6. "She's in Love with You"
7. "Stumblin' In"
8. "I May Be Too Young"
9. "Empty Rooms" (Quatro)
10. "48 Crash"
11. "Make Love to Me" (Quatro)
12. "Born to Run" (Bruce Springsteen)
13. "Four Letter Words"
14. "Tear Me Apart"
15. "Your Mama Won't Like Me"
16. "Rock Hard"
17. "Mama's Boy" (Quatro, Len Tuckey)
18. "If You Can't Give Me Love"

== Personnel ==
- Suzi Quatro – lead vocals, harmony vocals, bass guitar
- Robbie Gladwell – guitars, backing vocals
- Andy Dowding – drums, percussion
- Reg Webb – keyboards, piano, backing vocals
- Ray Beavis – saxophone, backing vocals
- Dick Hanson – trumpet, flugelhorn
- Chris Gower – trombone
