= In the Spotlight =

Studio album by Suzi Quatro
- Released: August 5, 2011
- Studios: Fortress Studios, London, UK (dates unknown); Dave's Room, North Hollywood, US (dates unknown); Emerald Studios, Nashville, US (dates unknown)
- Genre: Hard rock
- Length: 40:40
- Label: Cherry Red
- Producers: Mike Chapman; Davey Meshell; Andy Scott; Steve Grant

Suzi Quatro chronology
Back to the Drive (2006)	In the Spotlight (2011)	Quatro, Scott & Powell (2017)

In the Spotlight is the fifteenth studio album by the American singer-songwriter and bass guitar player Suzi Quatro.

The seeds for the album were sown when Mike Chapman, Quatro's original producer and composer of most of her hits, approached her with plans to take her back to her roots. Their reunion resulted in this modern take on Quatro's original attitude, which shows the influence she has had on modern female artists. "Strict Machine", a song originally performed by Goldfrapp, even contains a two line teaser from Quatro's number one hit "Can the Can", to show the similarities of the two tracks.

When the album was released, it received many positive reviews—Mojo rated the album three stars, while AllMusic rated it three-and-half stars out of five, commenting that except for one track, "In the Spotlight is an impressive comeback, which admirably doesn't rely solely on nostalgia to make itself heard." In September and October 2011, soon after the album was released, Quatro embarked on the 21-date sold-out Rocks the Spotlight Tour of Australia, also with great reviews.

== Release, promotion, marketing ==
In the Spotlight was first released in Australia on August 5, 2011. Then the album was released in Germany on August 19, 2011. It was released in the rest of the world (including the US) on August 29, 2011.

Victory Tischler-Blue produced the official music video for Suzi Quatro's "Strict Machine", a track from the album. This track is a cover of Goldfrapp's "Strict Machine", but Quatro's version of the song contains two extra lines from her own number one hit "Can the Can" (to show the similarity of the two songs' tunes).

On November 16, 2011, the official music video was released via the official Suzi Quatro YouTube channel. It includes live footage from Quatro's September/October 2011 Rocks the Spotlight Tour of Australia and the extra two lines from "Can the Can".

== Critical reception ==
Professional ratings
Review scores
Source	Rating
AllMusic	3.5/5 stars
The Gap	2/5 stars
laut.de	4/5 stars

Ulf Kubanke reviewed the album for laut.de. He rated the album four out of stars. Constantin Aravanlis reviewed the album favorably for Monsters and Critics.de. Gerald C. Stocker reviewed the album for The Gap. He rated the album two out of five stars.

Mojo magazine rated the album three out of five stars.

Alan Pedder of Wears the Trousers magazine reviewed the single "Whatever Love Is" and went on to comment about some other album tracks. Rhian Jones for the same publication reviewed the album itself. Pedder commented favorably on two tracks, unfavorably on two tracks, and did not comment on seven tracks. Jones commented favorably (directly or indirectly) on eight tracks, unfavorably on one track, and did not comment on two tracks.

Reviewing the single, Pedder wrote that Quatro's "Whatever Love Is" "is squarely aimed at her existing fans", and described "Strict Machine" and "Breaking Dishes" as "ropey covers" but concluded that "Hard Headed Woman" "is a much better fit for Quatro's seasoned, raspy vocals". By contrast, reviewing the album, Jones wrote that "Breaking Dishes" "yield[s] surprisingly well to a fundamentalist glam treatment and the gutsiness of Quatro's vocal approach". She also wrote that Quatro "has a decent stab at the wistful rock splendour of Yeah Yeah Yeahs' 'Turn Into'" and concluded that "despite one or two shaky moments then, In The Spotlight is a warm and triumphant slice of retro-rock".

Jon O'Brien of AllMusic commented favorably on nine tracks, unfavorably on one track, and did not comment on one track. He wrote that Quatro's "Strict Machine" is "a guitar-chugging mash-up of Goldfrapp's electro-pop reinvention in "Strict Machine"; [with] her own 1973 U.K. chart-topper "Can the Can," cleverly referencing the subtle similarities between the two". O'Brien concluded that "a misguided attempt at cod-reggae aside ("Hurt with You"), In the Spotlight is an impressive comeback, which admirably doesn't rely solely on nostalgia to make itself heard". He rated the album three-and-a-half stars out of five.

== Track listing ==
=== In the Spotlight ===
The musicians Nat Allison, Jez Davies, Owen Martin, and Mike Chapman contributed to all of the tracks except "Singing with Angels".

In the Spotlight track listing
Track	Title	Writer(s)	Guest musician(s)	Original artist(s)	Length
1.	"A Girl Like Me"	Mike Chapman			4:31
2.	"Whatever Love Is"	Chapman. Holly Knight			4:44
3.	"Spotlight"	Chapman			3:21
4.	"Strict Machine"	Allison Goldfrapp, Will Gregory, Nick Batt	The Neighborhood Bullys	Goldfrapp	3:10
5.	"Breaking Dishes" (originally "Breakin' Dishes")	Christopher Stewart, Terius Nash	The Neighborhood Bullys	Rihanna	4:01
6.	"Rosie Rose"	Chapman			4:04
7.	"Hurt with You"	Suzi Quatro	Ray Bevis, Toby Gucklhorn, Dick Hanson		4:18
8.	"Hot Kiss"	Todd Morse, Juliette Lewis, Kemble Walters, Jason Womack See Note 1 below.	The Neighborhood Bullys	Juliette and the Licks	2:47
9.	"Turn Into"	Brian Chase, Nicholas Zinner, Karen Orzolek	The Neighborhood Bullys	Yeah Yeah Yeahs	3:48
10.	"Hard Headed Woman"	Claude Demetrius		Elvis Presley See Note 2 below.	2:02
11. (Bonus track)	"Singing with Angels"	Quatro	James Burton, The Jordanaires (misspelled as "The Jordinaires" in the CD booklet)		3:54

Note 1 — according to the In the Spotlight CD booklet, "Morse/Lewis/Walters/Womack" wrote "Hot Kiss". According to AllMusic, the only composers were "Lewis, Morse".
Note 2 — it is generally accepted that Elvis Presley is the original artist for "Hard Headed Woman". Wears the Trousers Magazine (in its reviews of the album and of the associated single "Whatever Love Is") refers to "Wanda Jackson’s ‘Hard Headed Woman’".

=== In the Dark ===
Victory Tischler-Blue produced both of the bonus enhanced video tracks.

In the Dark track listing
Track	Title	Writer(s)	Guest musician(s)	Original artist(s)	Length
1.	"Empty Rooms"	Suzi Quatro			3:36
2.	"Make Love to Me"	Quatro			4:06
3.	"Why Do Rainbows Die"	Quatro			3:53
4.	"Truck Stop"	Quatro			3:31
5.	"If Ever There Was a Reason"	Quatro			4:20
6.	"Touch the Child in Me"	Quatro			3:17
7.	"Three Time Loser"	Quatro			3:09
8.	"One Dance Too Long"	Quatro			3:25
9. (Bonus enhanced video track)	"Singing with Angels"	Quatro	James Burton, The Jordanaires (misspelled as "The Jordinaires" in the CD booklet)		6:00
10. (Bonus enhanced video track)	"Strict Machine"	Allison Goldfrapp, Will Gregory, Nick Batt	The Neighborhood Bullys	Goldfrapp	3:08

== Personnel ==
- Nat Allison – guitars, backing vocals
- Ray Beavis – saxophone (on "Hurt with You")
- David Bianco – recording (of "Strict Machine", "Breaking Dishes", "Hot Kiss", "Turn Into")
- Mike Chapman – production, backing vocals
- Jez Davies – keyboards
- Pat Doonan – official website
- Joey Galvan – The neighborhood Bullys (on "Strict Machine", "Breaking Dishes", "Hot Kiss", "Turn Into")
- Toby Gucklhorn – trombone (on "Hurt with You")
- Rainer Haas – worldwide booking
- Dick Hanson – trumpet (on "Hurt with You")
- Michael Hays – The neighborhood Bullys (on "Strict Machine", "Breaking Dishes", "Hot Kiss", "Turn Into")
- Steve Kitchen – artwork
- Owen Martin – drums
- Davey Meshell – production, The neighborhood Bullys (on "Strict Machine", "Breaking Dishes", "Hot Kiss", "Turn Into")
- Tex Mosley – The neighborhood Bullys (on "Strict Machine", "Breaking Dishes", "Hot Kiss", "Turn Into")
- Simon Pilton – "support and inspiration"
- Suzi Quatro – vocals, bass
- Daryl Smith – artwork
- Nick Trepka – engineering

"Singing with Angels"

- James Burton – guitar
- Steve Grant – production
- The Jordanaires – backing vocals
- Suzi Quatro – vocals, bass
- Andy Scott – production

== Release history ==
Release history and formats for In the Spotlight
Date	Label	Format	Catalogue
August 5, 2011	Cherry Red	CD	CDBRED 511
October 29, 2012	Cherry Red	Box set	Box set, In the Spotlight Deluxe Edition: CR CDBOX8 Disc 1, In the Spotlight: CR CDBOX 8/A; Disc 2, In the Dark: CR CDBOX 8/B
