= Stumblin' In =

1978 single by Chris Norman and Suzi Quatro

- Cover art of the UK single

Single by Chris Norman and Suzi Quatro

from the album If You Knew Suzi...
- B-side: "A Stranger with You"
- Released: November 1978 (UK)
- Recorded: 1978
- Genre: Soft rock
- Length: 3:32 (single version); 3:56 (album version)
- Label: RSO
- Songwriters: Mike Chapman, Nicky Chinn
- Producer: Mike Chapman

Chris Norman singles chronology
"Stumblin' In" (1978)	"Hey Baby" (1982)

Suzi Quatro singles chronology
"The Race Is On" (1978)	"Stumblin' In" (1978)	"Don't Change My Luck" (1979)

"Stumblin' In" is a song written by Australian songwriter Mike Chapman and British-American songwriter Nicky Chinn, performed by English singer Chris Norman, the original vocal lead of the British rock band Smokie, and American singer Suzi Quatro. At first released as a standalone single, it was later added to some editions of the Quatro album If You Knew Suzi... It was Norman's first single as a solo artist.

In 2023, the Australian DJ Cyril created a remix of the song. The song went viral on TikTok. Among other things, the association football players from Bayern Munich used the song for a TikTok video. The remix also reached the charts in Germany, Austria, Switzerland and the United Kingdom, reaching number two in Germany and Austria. In Australia it was widely used in 2025 in an advertising campaign for Subaru vehicles.

== Background ==
The writing-producing team of Mike Chapman and Nicky Chinn were behind many of the 1970s hits for Suzi Quatro and for Chris Norman's band Smokie. In 1978, Chapman, Chinn, Quatro, and the members of Smokie were all at a party in Düsseldorf. As Chapman recounted, "Suzi was playing bass, and Chris was there with his arm round her, and they were singing into a mike, and I thought what a fantastic duet they'd make, because they looked so great together. The next day, I was in the studio with Suzi, and during a break, I came up with the line, 'Our love is alive'…I looked at Suzi and said, 'What about this, with you and Chris? Wouldn't it be great?' and she said it sounded fantastic.”

== Chart performance ==
The single peaked at number four on the Billboard Hot 100 in 1979. The song was Quatro's only U.S. top 40 hit and Norman's lone U.S. charting effort apart from his time with the band Smokie (where they charted three times while Norman was still a member). In the UK, where the song was also Norman's only chart hit as a solo artist, the disc hit the listing on 11 November 1978 and peaked at number 41 with eight weeks on the chart. It reached No. 11 on the Canada RPM Chart, but went to No. 1 on the Canada Adult Contemporary Chart.

== Use in media ==
In 2021, the song was used in the Paul Thomas Anderson film Licorice Pizza. A year later, in 2022, "Stumblin' In" was featured in episode 3 of the Netflix drama Dahmer – Monster: The Jeffrey Dahmer Story.

== Personnel ==
- Suzi Quatro – lead vocals
- Chris Norman – lead vocals

== Charts ==
=== Weekly charts ===
1979 weekly chart performance for "Stumblin' In"
Chart (1979)	Peak position
Australia (Kent Music Report)	2
Austria (Ö3 Austria Top 40)	6
Belgium (Ultratop 50 Flanders)	3
Canada Top Singles (RPM)	11
Canada Adult Contemporary (RPM)	1
Ireland (IRMA)	13
Netherlands (Dutch Top 40)	3
Netherlands (Single Top 100)	3
New Zealand (Recorded Music NZ)	2
South Africa (Springbok Radio)	2
Sweden (Sverigetopplistan)	7
Switzerland (Schweizer Hitparade)	7
UK Singles (Official Charts)	41
US Billboard Hot 100	4
US Adult Contemporary (Billboard)	4
US Cash Box Top 100	6
West Germany (GfK)	2

2024 weekly chart performance for "Stumblin' In"
Chart (2024)	Peak position
Kazakhstan Airplay (TopHit)	43

=== Monthly charts ===
2024 monthly chart performance for "Stumblin' In"
Chart (2024)	Peak position
Kazakhstan Airplay (TopHit)	48

=== Year-end charts ===
1979 year-end chart performance for "Stumblin' In"
Chart (1979)	Rank
Australia (Kent Music Report)	16
Belgium (Ultratop)	29
Canada Top Singles (RPM)	91
Netherlands (Dutch Top 40)	50
Netherlands (Single Top 100)	36
New Zealand (RIANZ)	14
South Africa (Springbok Radio)	12
US Billboard Hot 100	23
US Cash Box Top 100	62
West Germany (Media Control)	26

2024 year-end chart performance for "Stumblin' In"
Chart (2024)	Position
Kazakhstan Airplay (TopHit)	75

== Certifications ==
Certifications for "Stumblin' In"
Region	Certification	Certified units/sales
Germany (BVMI)	Gold	500,000^{^}
New Zealand (RMNZ)	3× Platinum	90,000^{‡}
United States (RIAA)	Gold	1,000,000^{^}
^{^} Shipments figures based on certification alone.^{‡} Sales+streaming figures based on certification alone.

== Release history ==
=== Film soundtrack albums ===
- Polle Fiction: Original Soundtrack (2002).
- Fleisch ist Mein Gemüse - Original Soundtrack (2008).
- Red Dog - Original Soundtrack (2011).
- Licorice Pizza - Original Motion Picture Soundtrack (2021).

== Cyril version ==
"Stumblin' In"

Single by Cyril
- Released: 10 November 2023
- Genre: Electronic
- Length: 3:33
- Label: Spinnin'
- Producer: Cyril

Cyril singles chronology
"Stumblin' In" (2023)	"The Sound of Silence" (2024)

Music video
- "Stumblin' In" on YouTube

In 2023, Australian musician Cyril Riley (known mononymously as Cyril) released his version which was an international hit, charting in many countries.

=== Weekly charts ===
Weekly chart performance for "Stumblin' In" by Cyril
Chart (2024–2025)	Peak position
Australia (ARIA)	15
Australia Dance (ARIA)	1
Austria (Ö3 Austria Top 40)	2
Belarus Airplay (TopHit)	39
Belgium (Ultratop 50 Flanders)	1
Belgium (Ultratop 50 Wallonia)	4
Bulgaria Airplay (PROPHON)	3
Canada (Canadian Hot 100)	61
Canada CHR/Top 40 (Billboard)	38
CIS Airplay (TopHit)	15
Czech Republic Airplay (ČNS IFPI)	1
Czech Republic Singles Digital (ČNS IFPI)	26
Estonia Airplay (TopHit)	2
France (SNEP)	11
Germany (GfK)	2
Global 200 (Billboard)	61
Greece International (IFPI)	60
Hungary (Dance Top 40)	1
Hungary (Rádiós Top 40)	1
Hungary (Single Top 40)	32
Iceland (Tónlistinn)	12
Ireland (IRMA)	23
Kazakhstan Airplay (TopHit)	185
Latvia Airplay (LaIPA)	5
Lithuania (AGATA)	37
Lithuania Airplay (TopHit)	4
Luxembourg (Billboard)	7
Moldova Airplay (TopHit)	1
Netherlands (Dutch Top 40)	1
Netherlands (Single Top 100)	5
New Zealand (Recorded Music NZ)	11
Poland (Polish Airplay Top 100)	1
Poland (Polish Streaming Top 100)	9
Portugal (AFP)	34
Romania Airplay (Media Forest)	1
Romania TV Airplay (Media Forest)	4
Russia Airplay (TopHit)	56
San Marino Airplay (SMRTV Top 50)	42
Serbia Airplay (Radiomonitor)	19
Slovakia Airplay (ČNS IFPI)	1
Slovakia Singles Digital (ČNS IFPI)	12
Sweden (Sverigetopplistan)	82
Switzerland (Schweizer Hitparade)	7
Turkey International Airplay (Radiomonitor Türkiye)	5
Ukraine Airplay (TopHit)	3
UK Singles (Official Charts)	68
UK Dance (Official Charts)	20
US Hot Dance/Electronic Songs (Billboard)	11

=== Monthly charts ===
Monthly chart performance for "Stumblin' In" by Cyril
Chart (2024)	Peak position
Belarus Airplay (TopHit)	58
CIS Airplay (TopHit)	17
Czech Republic (Rádio Top 100)	3
Estonia Airplay (TopHit)	3
Lithuania Airplay (TopHit)	6
Moldova Airplay (TopHit)	1
Romania Airplay (TopHit)	1
Russia Airplay (TopHit)	76
Slovakia (Rádio Top 100)	1
Ukraine Airplay (TopHit)	4

=== Year-end charts ===
2024 year-end chart performance for "Stumblin' In"
Chart (2024)	Position
Australia (ARIA)	29
Australia Dance (ARIA)	2
Austria (Ö3 Austria Top 40)	3
Belgium (Ultratop Flanders)	2
Bulgaria Airplay (PROPHON)	5
CIS Airplay (TopHit)	13
Estonia Airplay (TopHit)	5
France (SNEP)	37
Germany (GfK)	4
Global 200 (Billboard)	145
Hungary (Dance Top 40)	25
Hungary (Rádiós Top 40)	15
Hungary (Single Top 40)	68
Iceland (Tónlistinn)	24
Lithuania Airplay (TopHit)	4
Moldova Airplay (TopHit)	2
Netherlands (Dutch Top 40)	2
Netherlands (Single Top 100)	6
New Zealand (Recorded Music NZ)	19
Poland (Polish Airplay Top 100)	1
Poland (Polish Streaming Top 100)	14
Portugal (AFP)	137
Romania Airplay (TopHit)	1
Russia Airplay (TopHit)	135
Switzerland (Schweizer Hitparade)	8
US Hot Dance/Electronic Songs (Billboard)	23

2025 year-end chart performance for "Stumblin' In"
Chart (2025)	Position
Australia (ARIA)	93
Austria (Ö3 Austria Top 40)	30
Belarus Airplay (TopHit)	156
Belgium (Ultratop 50 Flanders)	55
Belgium (Ultratop 50 Wallonia)	134
CIS Airplay (TopHit)	60
Estonia Airplay (TopHit)	63
Germany (GfK)	33
Hungary (Dance Top 40)	2
Hungary (Rádiós Top 40)	2
Lithuania Airplay (TopHit)	34
Moldova Airplay (TopHit)	10
Netherlands (Single Top 100)	89
Poland (Polish Airplay Top 100)	60
Romania Airplay (TopHit)	111
Switzerland (Schweizer Hitparade)	62

=== Certifications ===
Certifications for "Stumblin' In" by Cyril
Region	Certification	Certified units/sales
Australia (ARIA)	5× Platinum	350,000^{‡}
Austria (IFPI Austria)	2× Platinum	60,000^{‡}
Belgium (BRMA)	2× Platinum	80,000^{‡}
Canada (Music Canada)	2× Platinum	160,000^{‡}
Denmark (IFPI Danmark)	Platinum	90,000^{‡}
France (SNEP)	Diamond	333,333^{‡}
Germany (BVMI)	3× Gold	900,000^{‡}
Italy (FIMI)	Gold	50,000^{‡}
New Zealand (RMNZ)	4× Platinum	120,000^{‡}
Poland (ZPAV)	Diamond	250,000^{‡}
Portugal (AFP)	Platinum	10,000^{‡}
Spain (Promusicae)	Platinum	60,000^{‡}
Switzerland (IFPI Switzerland)	2× Platinum	40,000^{‡}
United Kingdom (BPI)	Gold	400,000^{‡}
^{‡} Sales+streaming figures based on certification alone.
