= Oh, Suzi Q. =

Studio album by Suzi Quatro
- Released: 1990
- Genre: Rock; pop rock; soft rock
- Length: 58:06
- Label: Generation Record, and Bellaphon.
- Producer: Ferdi Bolland & Rob Bolland

Suzi Quatro chronology
Annie Get Your Gun – 1986 London Cast (1986)	Oh, Suzi Q. (1990)	What Goes Around – Greatest & Latest (1995)

Oh, Suzi Q. is the tenth solo studio album by the rock singer-songwriter and bass guitarist Suzi Quatro. It was originally released in 1990, by the record labels Generation Record, and Bellaphon. The album was her last recording of original material for five years, until she released What Goes Around - Greatest & Latest in 1995. It is also notably the first album not to feature her long-time guitarist and then-husband Len Tuckey, whom she would divorce in 1992.

The album was received negatively by the majority of music critics. The album went largely unnoticed by the public, being a commercial disappointment, and even missed the album charts worldwide (her second studio album to do so).

== Track listing ==
1. "Suzi Q." (Dale Hawkins, Stan Lewis, Eleanor Broadwater) - 4:32
2. "Southern Comfort" (Rob Bolland, Ferdi Bolland, Quatro) - 5:40
3. "Love Touch" (Rob Bolland, Ferdi Bolland) - 5:24
4. "Intimate Strangers" (Quatro, Rhiannon Wolfe) - 3:34
5. "Kiss Me Goodbye" (Quatro, Rhiannon Wolfe) - 4:07
6. "The Great Midnight Rock 'N' Roll House Party" (Rob Bolland, Ferdi Bolland) - 4:22
7. "Take Me In Your Arms (And Rock Me)" (Brian Holland, Lamont Dozier, Eddie Holland) - 3:11
8. "Victim of Circumstance" (Quatro) - 4:21
9. "Elusive Lover" (Quatro, Rhiannon Wolfe) - 4:00
10. "Best Thing in My Life" (Quatro) - 5:01
11. "We Live Forever" (Rob Bolland, Ferdi Bolland) - 5:17
12. "Baby You're a Star" (Rob Bolland, Ferdi Bolland) - 3:24
13. "We Found Love" (Rob Bolland, Ferdi Bolland) - 5:13
