= Devil Gate Drive =

1974 single by Suzi Quatro

Single by Suzi Quatro

from the album Quatro
- B-side: "In the Morning"
- Released: 10 February 1974
- Genre: Glam rock
- Label: RAK Records
- Songwriters: Nicky Chinn; Mike Chapman
- Producers: Nicky Chinn; Mike Chapman

Suzi Quatro singles chronology
"Daytona Demon" (1973)	"Devil Gate Drive" (1974)	"Too Big" (1974)

"Devil Gate Drive" is a song by American singer Suzi Quatro. It was Quatro's second (and final) solo number one single in the UK, spending two weeks at the top of the chart in February 1974.

Written and produced by Nicky Chinn and Mike Chapman, "Devil Gate Drive" was the second number one in a row for the "ChinniChap" writing and production team, following the success of "Tiger Feet" by Mud. The single was re-recorded for Quatro's 1995 album What Goes Around as the opening track. The track was the B-side to the re-release in 1987, when "Can the Can" became a minor hit.

A vocal extract was used on Orbital's "Bigpipe Style". The song was featured on the show Happy Days, during season 5, on the episode "Fonzie and Leather Tuscadero, Part II". Quatro played Leather Tuscadero on the show.

== Chart performance ==
=== Weekly charts ===
Chart (1974)	Peak position
Australia (Go-Set Top 40)	1
Australia (Kent Music Report)	1
Austria (Ö3 Austria Top 40)	14
Belgium (Ultratop 50 Flanders)	26
France (IFOP)	14
Germany (GfK)	2
Ireland (IRMA)	1
Netherlands (Dutch Top 40)	7
Netherlands (Single Top 100)	5
Norway (VG-lista)	1
New Zealand (RMNZ)	15
Switzerland (Schweizer Hitparade)	2
UK Singles (Official Charts)	1

=== Year-end charts ===
Chart (1974)	Rank
Australia (Kent Music Report)	13
Netherlands (Dutch Top 40)	81
Netherlands (Single Top 100)	74

== See also ==
- List of number-one singles in Australia during the 1970s
- List of number-one singles of 1974 (Ireland)
- List of number-one songs in Norway
- List of UK Singles Chart number ones of the 1970s
