= Can the Can =

- The single cover of "Can the Can"

Single by Suzi Quatro
- B-side: "Ain't Ya Something Honey"
- Released: 1973
- Genre: Glam rock; hard rock
- Length: 3:34
- Label: RAK
- Songwriters: Mike Chapman, Nicky Chinn (A-side); Suzi Quatro (B-side)
- Producers: Mike Chapman, Nicky Chinn (A-side); Mickie Most (B-side)

Suzi Quatro singles chronology
"Rolling Stone" (1972)	"Can the Can" (1973)	"48 Crash" (1973)

Audio
- "Can the Can" on YouTube

"Can the Can" is the second solo single by American singer-songwriter Suzi Quatro and her first to reach number one on the UK singles chart, spending a single week at the top of the chart in June 1973. It also reached number one on the European and Australian charts; Quatro achieved her most consistent success throughout her career in these markets. The single belatedly became a hit in the US peaking at number 56 on the Billboard Hot 100 in 1976. It was re-released as a single in the UK, with "Devil Gate Drive" as the B-side, in 1984, but failed to chart. The single made the charts again in 1987 in the UK at number 87, it also appeared on her 1995 album What Goes Around.

This single made Quatro the first female bass guitar player to become a major rock star and therefore broke a barrier to women's participation in rock music.

== Background ==
This, Quatro's second solo single, was released after she moved from the United States to Britain. In the United States, she had already released two singles with the all-female band The Pleasure Seekers. Her first solo single, "Rolling Stone," was recorded with session players. "Rolling Stone" only achieved popularity in Portugal, where it went to number one.

For "Can the Can," Quatro had organized her own band, which had toured the United Kingdom as the warm-up act for Slade and Thin Lizzy, and they had new songwriters/producers Mike Chapman and Nicky Chinn.

The song "Can the Can" was written, composed, and produced by Mike Chapman and Nicky Chinn. It has the refrain :

- Make a stand for your man, honey, try to can the can
- Put your man in the can, honey, get him while you can
- Can the can, can the can, if you can, well can the can

— – Mike Chapman and Nicky Chinn

According to songwriter Nicky Chinn, the phrase "can the can" means "... something that is pretty impossible, you can't get one can inside another if they are the same size, so we're saying you can't put your man in the can if he is out there and not willing to commit."

The song "Ain't Ya Something Honey," with which "Can the Can" was backed, was written and composed by Quatro and produced by Mickie Most.

== Accolades ==
Year	Publisher	Country	Accolade	Rank
2005	Bruce Pollock	United States	"The 7,500 Most Important Songs of 1944-2000"	Unordered
2005	Toby Creswell	Australia	"1001 Songs"	Unordered
2009	Gilles Verlant and Thomas Caussé	France	"3000 Rock Classics"	Unordered

== Chart performance ==
=== Weekly charts ===
Chart (1973–1974)	Peak position
Australia (Go-Set)	1
Australia (Kent Music Report)	1
Austria (Ö3 Austria Top 40)	2
Belgium (Ultratop 50 Flanders)	5
France (IFOP)	8
Germany (GfK)	1
Ireland (IRMA)	5
Netherlands (Dutch Top 40)	14
Netherlands (Single Top 100)	13
New Zealand (Listener)	14
Switzerland (Schweizer Hitparade)	1
UK Singles (Official Charts)	1

Chart (1976)	Peak position
US Billboard Hot 100	56
US Cash Box	62

=== Year-end charts ===
Chart (1973)	Rank
Australia (Go-Set)	16
Australia (Kent Music Report)	7
Austria (Ö3 Austria Top 40)	15
Belgium (Ultratop 50 Flanders)	65
France (IFOP)	29
Netherlands (Single Top 100)	100
Switzerland (Schweizer Hitparade)	4

=== Sales and certifications ===
Region	Certification	Certified units/sales
United Kingdom (BPI)	Silver	250,000^{^}
^{^} Shipments figures based on certification alone.

== See also ==
- List of number-one singles in Australia during the 1970s
- List of number-one hits of 1973 (Germany)
- List of number-one singles from 1968 to 1979 (Switzerland)
- List of UK Singles Chart number ones of the 1970s
