= Len Tuckey =

Scottish musician, songwriter, composer and record producer

- Also known as: "Strucky"
- Born: Richard Leonard Tuckey; December 15, 1945 (age 80); Aberdeen, Scotland
- Genres: Glam rock; hard rock; folk rock; country rock; new wave
- Occupations: Songwriter; musician; record producer
- Instrument: Guitar
- Years active: 1960s–present

Richard Leonard 'Len' Tuckey (born December 15, 1945) is a Scottish musician, songwriter, composer and record producer. In a career spanning more than 40 years, Tuckey was the guitarist for The Chasers and The Riot Squad before joining the Nashville Teens, and came to prominence in the early 1970s as the lead guitarist for Suzi Quatro. He is credited as the co-writer of many of Quatro's songs, including hits such as "Mama's Boy".

== Musical career ==
In the 1960s Tuckey was a member of the bands The Chasers and The Riot Squad. In 1968 he joined the Nashville Teens, and in 1972 he became a member of Suzi Quatro's backing band and came to worldwide prominence. After leaving Quatro's band he formed blues-rock band "Legend" with Bill Legend of T. Rex and for a while managed a version of Slade featuring original members Dave Hill and Don Powell.

== Personal life ==
In 1976, Tuckey married Suzi Quatro. They had two children together (Laura in 1982 and Richard Leonard in 1984) and divorced in 1992.
