= KT Tunstall discography =

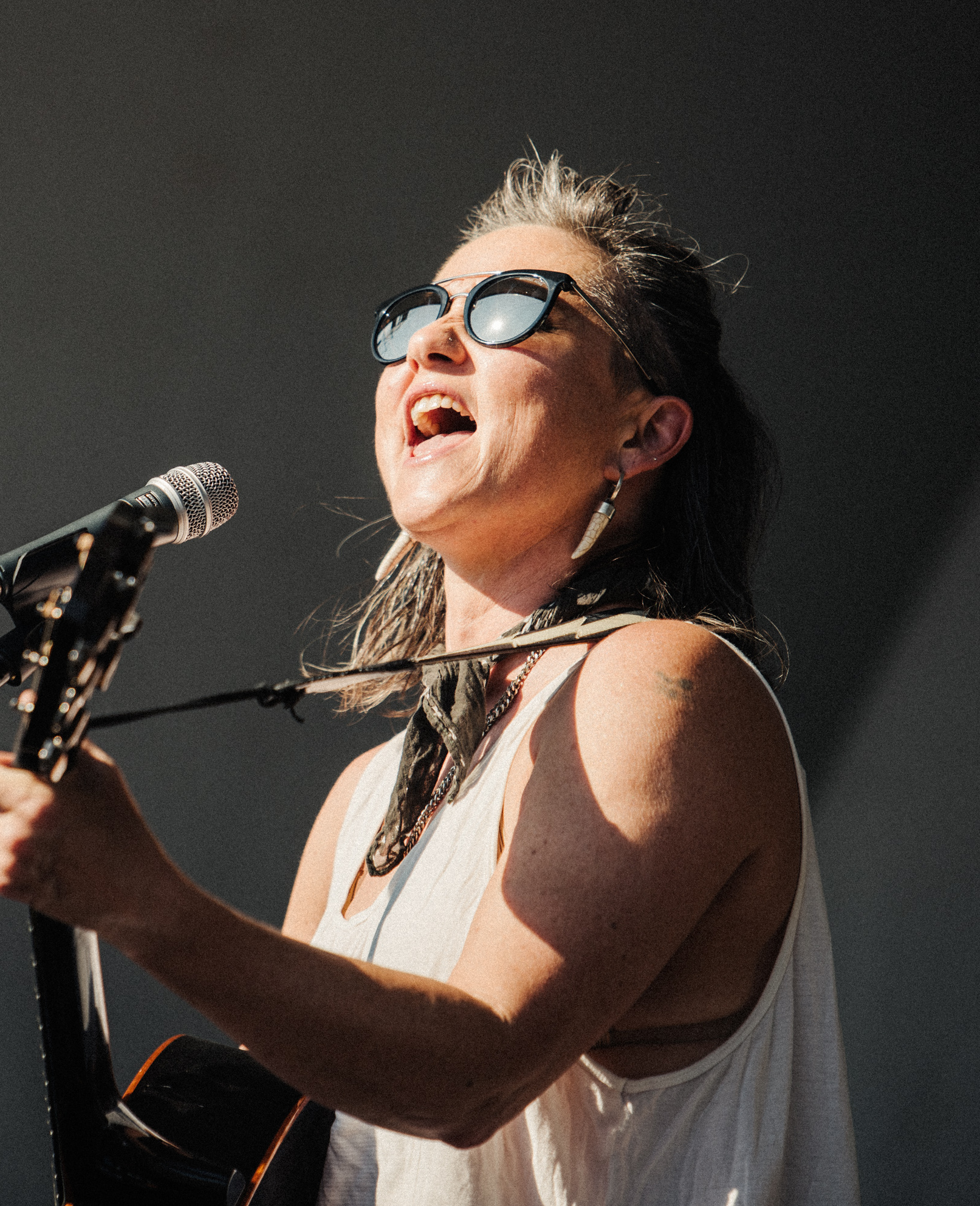
- Tunstall performing in Canada, 2024
- Studio albums: 8
- Extended plays: 6
- Live albums: 7
- Singles: 30
- Music videos: 29
- Collection album: 2

The discography of KT Tunstall, a Scottish rock and folk recording artist, includes eight studio albums, seven as a solo artist, a collaboration album with Suzi Quatro, and twenty-three singles. In addition to her recording work, she has also written various soundtracks for movies. In 2014, Tunstall wrote "Miracle" as an official soundtrack single for the film Winter's Tale, and "We Could Be Kings" for Million Dollar Arm.

KT Tunstall's debut studio album, Eye to the Telescope, was released in December 2004, and sold four million copies worldwide. The album produced two top twenty singles in the United Kingdom and was certified five times platinum. In 2005, it was nominated for the Mercury Prize, an annual music prize awarded for the best album from the United Kingdom or Ireland. Tunstall's song "Black Horse and the Cherry Tree" was nominated for Best Female Pop Vocal Performance at the 49th Grammy Awards in 2007.

In May 2006, Tunstall released an acoustic collection album, KT Tunstall's Acoustic Extravaganza, a CD and a DVD comprising songs from her debut and unreleased material. Her second studio album, Drastic Fantastic, was released in September 2007. The album has produced three singles and has sold 234,000 copies in the United States. Her third studio album Tiger Suit was released in 2010, followed by an EP "The Scarlet Tulip EP", released on 8 April 2011. On 10 June 2013, Tunstall released her fourth studio album Invisible Empire // Crescent Moon. Critically acclaimed, it was preceded by lead single "Feel It All" and other singles: "Invisible Empire" and "Made of Glass".

Her fifth studio album, the first in a three album trilogy, Kin was released on 9 September 2016. Golden State EP, with its lead single "Evil Eye" was released on 16 June 2016 to promote the album. The second album in the trilogy, Wax was released in 2018, whilst the third and final release in the trilogy, Nut, was released in 2022. In 2023, she released a collaboration album with American musician Suzi Quatro, entitled Face to Face.

== Albums ==
=== Studio albums ===
Title	Album details	Peak chart positions										Sales	Certifications
Title	Album details	SCO	UK	AUS	BEL (FL)	FRA	GER	IRL	NLD	SWI	US	Sales	Certifications
Eye to the Telescope	Released: 13 December 2004 (UK); Label: Relentless (CDRELX06); Formats: CD, DD	1	3	43	72	7	43	4	53	29	33	WW: 4,500,000 (Note: Worldwide sales as of August 2007); UK: 1,682,867 (Note: Sales as of November 2016); US: 1,300,000 (Note: Sales as of September 2010)	BPI: 5× Platinum; IFPI SWI: Gold; IRMA: 5× Platinum; RIAA: Platinum; SNEP: Gold
Drastic Fantastic	Released: 10 September 2007 (UK); Label: Relentless (CDREL15); Formats: CD, CD/DVD, DD, LP	1	3	48	49	30	35	10	21	8	9	UK: 291,322 (Note: Sales as of November 2016); US: 234,000 (Note: Sales as of September 2010)	BPI: Gold; IRMA: Gold
Tiger Suit	Released: 24 September 2010 (UK); Label: Relentless (CDRELX22); Formats: CD, CD/DVD, DD	2	5	—	89	118	89	33	61	34	43		BPI: Silver
Invisible Empire // Crescent Moon	Released: 10 June 2013 (UK) 6 August 2013 (US); Label: Virgin, Relentless, Blue Note; Format: CD, CD/DVD, DD, vinyl	7	14	—	51	—	—	30	84	56	64		
Kin	Released: 9 September 2016; Label: Caroline, Sony/ATV Music; Format: CD, DD, vinyl	7	7	—	—	—	—	—	—	96	—		
Wax	Released: 5 October 2018; Label: Virgin; Format: CD, DD, vinyl	6	15	—	—	—	—	—	—	—	—		
Nut	Released: 9 September 2022; Label: EMI; Format: CD, DD, vinyl, cassette	4	25	—	—	—	—	—	—	—	—		
Face to Face (with Suzi Quatro)	Released: 11 August 2023; Label: Sun Records; Format: CD, DD, vinyl	10	—	—	—	—	—	—	—	41	—		
"—" denotes items which were not released in that country or failed to chart.

=== Compilation and collection albums ===
Title	Album details	Peak chart positions	
Title	Album details	UK	FRA
KT Tunstall's Acoustic Extravaganza	Released: 8 May 2006 (UK); Label: Relentless (CDRELX08); Formats: CD/DVD, DD	32	132
KT Tunstall's Acoustic Extravaganza 2	Released: 30 July 2017 (UK); Label: Not on Label (KTT13-CD); Formats: CD	—	—
"—" denotes items which were not released in that country or failed to chart.

=== Live albums ===
List of live albums, with selected chart positions
Date	Title
Live from SoHo	Released: 27 May 2008; Label: Relentless; Formats: Digital download; Released exclusively through iTunes; Peaked 199 on US Billboard 200
Energy Live Session: KT Tunstall	Released: 12 November 2010; Label: Relentless; Recorded at ISC Club Bern; Formats: Digital download; Released exclusively through the iTunes Store
Live at the Wiltern	Released: 25 January 2011; Label: Relentless; Recorded at the Wiltern Theatre; Formats: Digital download; Released exclusively through iTunes
Live in London March 2011	Released: 8 March 2011; Label: Virgin Records; Recorded at HMV Forum; Formats: Digital download, CD
Live Islington Assembly Hall	Released: 21 June 2013; Label: Virgin Records; Recorded at Islington Assembly Hall, London; Formats: Digital download, CD
Live at O2 Shepherds Bush Empire	Released: 10 November 2016; Label: LiveHereNow; Recorded at O2 Shepherds Bush Empire, London; Formats: Digital download, CD, vinyl
Live at the Barrowland Ballroom Glasgow 2019	Released: 9 March 2019; Label: LiveHereNow; Recorded at Barrowland Ballroom, Glasgow; Formats: CD

=== Demo albums ===
Date	Title
Tracks in July	Released: 2000; Labels: Self-released; Formats: CD
Toons March '03	Released: 2003; Labels: Self-released; Formats: CD

== Extended plays ==
List of extended plays, with selected chart positions
Date	Title
False Alarm	Released: 11 October 2004; Labels: Relentless (RELCD #12); Formats: Double 7" vinyl, CD, digital download
Live in LA - EP	Released: 7 March 2006; Label: Relentless; Formats: Digital download; Released exclusively through iTunes
Have Yourself a Very KT Christmas	Released: 14 October 2007; Label: EMI (#5099950772421); Formats: CD; Released exclusively to Target stores in the US; Peaked 92 on US Billboard 200
The Scarlet Tulip EP	Released: 11 April 2011; Label: Sony/ATV Music; Formats: Digital download, CD, 10" vinyl
Golden State EP	Released: 16 June 2016; Label: Caroline, Sony/ATV Music; Formats: Digital download, CD
Extra Wax	Released: 13 April 2019; Label: Rostrum; Formats: Vinyl

== Singles ==
Title	Year	Peak chart positions										Certifications	Album
Title	Year	SCO	UK	BEL	FRA	GER	IRL	NLD	NZ	SWI	US	Certifications	Album
"Throw Me a Rope"	2004	—	—	—	—	—	—	—	—	—	—		False Alarm
"Black Horse and the Cherry Tree"	2005	10	28	35	23	51	16	80	20	92	20	BPI: Gold; RMNZ: Gold	Eye to the Telescope
"Other Side of the World"	2005	10	13	—	—	—	25	21	—	—	—	BPI: Silver	Eye to the Telescope
"Suddenly I See"	2005	12	12	59	66	89	25	20	5	46	21	BPI: 2× Platinum; RMNZ: 2× Platinum	Eye to the Telescope
"Under the Weather"	2005	28	39	—	—	—	—	—	—	—	—		Eye to the Telescope
"Another Place to Fall"	2006	24	52	—	—	—	—	—	—	—	—		Eye to the Telescope
"Hold On"	2007	11	21	—	—	100	39	46	—	26	— (Note: "Hold On" did not enter the Billboard Hot 100, but peaked at number four on the Bubbling Under Hot 100 chart.)		Drastic Fantastic
"Saving My Face"	2007	19	50	56	—	—	—	—	—	93	—		Drastic Fantastic
"If Only"	2008	15	45	—	—	—	—	—	—	—	—		Drastic Fantastic
"Fade Like a Shadow"	2010	—	—	—	—	—	—	—	—	—	—		Tiger Suit
"(Still a) Weirdo"	2010	30	39	91	—	—	—	—	—	—	—		Tiger Suit
"Glamour Puss"	2010	—	—	—	—	—	—	—	—	—	—		Tiger Suit
"Feel It All"	2013	—	—	—	—	—	—	—	—	—	—		Invisible Empire // Crescent Moon
"Invisible Empire"	2013	—	—	—	—	—	—	—	—	—	—		Invisible Empire // Crescent Moon
"Made of Glass"	2013	—	—	—	—	—	—	—	—	—	—		Invisible Empire // Crescent Moon
"Come On, Get In"	2013	—	110	—	—	—	—	—	—	—	—		Tiger Suit
"Evil Eye"	2016	—	—	—	—	—	—	—	—	—	—		Golden State EP
"Maybe It's a Good Thing"	2016	—	—	—	—	—	—	—	—	—	—		Kin
"Hard Girls"	2016	—	—	—	—	—	—	—	—	—	—		Kin
"Love Is an Ocean"	2016	—	—	—	—	—	—	—	—	—	—		Kin
"It Took Me So Long to Get Here, But Here I Am"	2016	—	—	—	—	—	—	—	—	—	—		Kin
"Two Way" (featuring James Bay)	2017	—	—	—	—	—	—	—	—	—	—		Kin
"The River"	2018	—	—	—	—	—	—	—	—	—	—		Wax
"Human Being"	2018	—	—	—	—	—	—	—	—	—	—		Wax
"Little Red Thread"	2019	—	—	—	—	—	—	—	—	—	—		Wax
"Caledonia" (featuring Alan Cumming)	2021	—	— (Note: "Caledonia" did not enter the UK Singles Chart, but peaked at number 91 on the UK Download Singles chart.)	—	—	—	—	—	—	—	—		Non-album single
"Canyons"	2022	—	—	—	—	—	—	—	—	—	—		Nut
"I Am the Pilot"	2022	—	—	—	—	—	—	—	—	—	—		Nut
"Private Eyes"	2022	—	—	—	—	—	—	—	—	—	—		Nut
"Shine a Light" (with Suzi Quatro)	2023	—	—	—	—	—	—	—	—	—	—		Face to Face
"—" denotes items which were not released in that country or failed to chart.

== Soundtracks ==
Year	Title	Movie
2010	"Boy"	The Kid soundtrack
2014	"Miracle"	Winter's Tale soundtrack
2014	"We Could Be Kings"	Million Dollar Arm: Original Motion Picture Soundtrack
2015	"Float"	Tinker Bell and the Legend of the NeverBeast soundtrack
2015	"1000 Years" (featuring Bleu)	Tinker Bell and the Legend of the NeverBeast soundtrack
2015	"Strange Sight"	Tinker Bell and the Legend of the NeverBeast soundtrack
2015	"Fit In"	3 Generations soundtrack
2016	"Bad Moms (Suite)"	Bad Moms soundtrack
2016	"Enough Is Enough (Suite)"	Bad Moms soundtrack
2016	"Get Your Tits Up (Suite)"	Bad Moms soundtrack

== Music videos ==
Year	Title	Director(s)
2005	"Black Horse and the Cherry Tree"	Sophie Muller
2005	"Other Side of the World"	Big TV!
2005	"Suddenly I See" (Version 1)	Big TV!
2005	"Under the Weather"	Jamie Thraves
2006	"Another Place to Fall"	Tim Pope
2006	"Suddenly I See" (Version 2)	Patrick Daughters
2006	"Suddenly I See" (Version 3)	Honey
2007	"Hold On"	Perou
2007	"Saving My Face"	Chris Bran
2008	"If Only"	James Caddick
2008	"Little Favours"	Chris Bran
2010	"(Still a) Weirdo"	Paul Minor
2010	"Fade Like a Shadow"	Paul Minor
2010	"Glamour Puss - Kollaborative"	Collaborative video
2013	"Feel It All - Band Jam"	Isaac Ravishankara
2013	"Feel It All" (Album Version)	Alex Kemp
2013	"Invisible Empire"	Chris Turner
2013	"Made of Glass"	Chris Turner
2013	"Come On, Get In"	Elizabeth Hobbs & John McLean
2016	"Evil Eye"	KT Tunstall
2016	"Maybe It's a Good Thing"	Yoni Weisberg
2016	"Hard Girls"	Chris Turner
2016	"Love is an Ocean"	Chris Turner
2016	"It Took Me So Long to Get Here, But Here I Am"	KT Tunstall
2017	"Two Way"	Christopher M. Anthony
2018	"The River"	Alexo Wandael
2018	"Human Being"	KT Tunstall
2019	"Little Red Thread"	SZOP
2022	"Canyons"	KT Tunstall & Cortney Armitage
2022	"I Am the Pilot"	Josh McCartney
2022	"Private Eyes"	KT Tunstall & Cortney Armitage

== Other appearances ==
These songs have not appeared on a studio album released by Tunstall.

Year	Song	Album	Notes
2003	"Refugee"	Laughter Through Tears	Performed with Oi Va Voi
2003	"Yesterday's Mistakes"	Laughter Through Tears	Performed with Oi Va Voi
2003	"Ladino Song"	Laughter Through Tears	Performed with Oi Va Voi
2006	"Lazarus"	Poison Sweet Madeira	Performed with Sophie Solomon
2006	"Darkness on the Face of the Earth"	Moving Out to the Country	Performed with Jools Holland
2007	"Under the Moonlight"	The Boy with No Name	Performed with Travis
2007	"Sing"	Songs of Mass Destruction	Performed with Annie Lennox
2007	"I Want You Back"	The Saturday Sessions: The Dermot O'Leary Show	BBC Radio 2 Session. Cover of Jackson 5 song.
2007	"Let's Stick Together"	Radio 1: Established 1967	Cover of Bryan Ferry song
2008	"The Hidden Heart"	Songs for Survival	Album released in support of the Survival International charity
2008	"Happy Man"	I Started Out with Nothin and I Still Got Most of It Left	Performed with Seasick Steve
2008	"The Letter"	I Started Out with Nothin and I Still Got Most of It Left	Performed with Seasick Steve
2009	"Hazel Black"	The Sun Came Out	Performed with Neil Finn
2009	"Black Silk Ribbon"	The Sun Came Out	Performed with Bic Runga
2009	"The Witching Hour"	The Sun Came Out	Background vocals supporting Phil Selway
2010	"Don't You Forget About Me"	Songs to Save a Life.	
2010	"Somebody to Love"	Rhythms del Mundo Revival	
2012	"Third Swan"	Diamond Mine (Jubilee Edition)	Performed with King Creosote & Jon Hopkins.
2013	"The 3 Deaths of Lucky"	The Coincidentalist	Performed with Howe Gelb.
2014	"Fellow Man"; "The Blues you Sang"; "Sweet Sweet"; "Guy Fawkes'Signature"; "Thinking about Kat"; "Feathers Are Falling"; "Broken Wave (A Blues for Doogie)"; "King of the Moles"; "Great Ghosts"; "Sleep On"; "Embers"; "Honey on Thigh"; "As Grey and As White"	The Cellardyke Recording and Wassailing Society	Co-performed with James Yorkston and The Pictish Trail
2020	"Wash Ya Hands"		Performed with The Freelance Hellraiser, Savage Grace
2020	"I Still Haven't Found What I'm Looking For"	Worst of 2020	Featured on the Pomplamoose cover the U2 song.
2026	"Tempting Fate"	We Will Always Be the Way We Were	Performed with Jack Savoretti
