= We Could Be Kings =

Single by KT Tunstall and A. R. Rahman

from the album Million Dollar Arm (Original Motion Picture Soundtrack)
- Released: 12 May 2014
- Recorded: January 2014
- Genre: World music
- Length: 3:08
- Label: Walt Disney
- Songwriter(s): A. R. Rahman; KT Tunstall
- Producer(s): A. R. Rahman

"We Could Be Kings" is a song by Scottish recording artist KT Tunstall and Academy Award winning composer A. R. Rahman for the film Million Dollar Arm. It was released on 12 May 2014. The song is the third soundtrack written and released by Tunstall after The Kid's "Boy", and "Miracle".

This new song confirms Tunstall's new orientation in music, so as she announced in an interview where she declared she wishes to take a musical break after Invisible Empire // Crescent Moon and write soundtracks for movies.

== Background ==
After the release of "Made of Glass" in December 2013, Tunstall had announced she would take a break with her album-writing career, since her fifth studio album Invisible Empire // Crescent Moon was her most acclaimed album. In an interview, she said she wanted to take a break with her musical career, and that she was aiming at writing soundtracks for movies.

On 11 February 2014 the song "Miracle" is released for the Winter's Tale soundtrack. Tunstall declared she worked on another track with Rahman in January, the song "We Could Be Kings" is one of them.

On 14 May 2014 Tunstall posted the link for the new song on her Facebook account.

== Composition ==
The song is a world music, Hindi inspired that fits with the theme of the movie where English lyrics sung by Tunstall is backed by Swaras thrown at high pitched vocals by Rahman.
