= Live in London March 2011 =

Live album by KT Tunstall
- Released: 2011
- Recorded: 8 March 2011
- Venue: HMV Forum (London)
- Genre: Alternative rock
- Length: 93:11
- Label: EMI
- Producers: Jim Abbiss; Steve Osborne

KT Tunstall chronology
Tiger Suit (2010)	Live in London March 2011 (2011)	The Scarlet Tulip EP (2011)

Live in London March 2011 is a 2011 live album studio release from KT Tunstall, featuring tracks from four of her albums and EPs and one cover. It is her fifth live release, fourth live album, and the first live album to be released on CD. It follows the release of Tiger Suit

== Release ==
The album was released on 8 March 2011 on International Women's Day. It was recorded at the HMV Forum in London, by LiveHereNow, a section of Abbey Road Studios specialising in recording concerts and distributing them directly.

The album features an acoustic track from The Scarlet Tulip EP: "The Hidden Heart", and a cover of The Cure's "Close to Me".

The album was available through her online store, the Abbey Road Live Here Now, and at her live shows.

== Track listing ==
=== Disc One ===
No.	Title	Writer(s)	Producer(s)	Length
1.	"Come On, Get In"	KT Tunstall, Martin Terefe	Jim Abbiss	5:14
2.	"Glamour Puss"	KT Tunstall, Greg Kurstin	Jim Abbiss	4:30
3.	"Uummannaq Song"	KT Tunstall	Jim Abbiss	4:47
4.	"False Alarm"	KT Tunstall, Martin Terefe	Steve Osborne	7:25
5.	"If Only"	KT Tunstall, Jimmy Hogarth	Steve Osborne	4:13
6.	"Other Side of the World"	KT Tunstall, Martin Terefe	Martin Terefe	7:39
7.	"The Hidden Heart"	KT Tunstall	Tunstall, Luke Bullen	4:23
8.	"Black Horse and the Cherry Tree"	KT Tunstall	Steve Osborne	5:03
9.	"Difficulty"	KT Tunstall	Jim Abbiss	5:22
10.	"Lost"	KT Tunstall, Martin Terefe	Jim Abbiss	5:07
11.	"Golden Frames"	KT Tunstall	Jim Abbiss	4:02
Total length:				56:25

=== Disc Two ===
No.	Title	Writer(s)	Producer(s)	Length
1.	"Saving My Face"	KT Tunstall	Steve Osborne	5:32
2.	"Madame Trudeaux"	KT Tunstall, Linda Perry	Jim Abbiss	4:02
3.	"Push That Knot Away"	KT Tunstall	Jim Abbiss	5:29
4.	"Fade Like a Shadow"	KT Tunstall	Jim Abbiss	5:11
5.	"(Still a) Weirdo"	KT Tunstall, Greg Kurstin	Greg Kurstin	4:39
6.	"Close to Me"	Robert Smith	Robert Smith, David M. Allen	4:31
7.	"Suddenly I See"	KT Tunstall	Steve Osborne	5:52
Total length:				35:01
