= Winter's Tale (soundtrack) =

2014 film soundtrack album

Winter's Tale (Original Motion Picture Soundtrack)

Film score by Hans Zimmer and Rupert Gregson-Williams
- Released: February 4, 2014 (digital); February 11, 2014 (physical)
- Studio: Newman Scoring Stage, 20th Century Fox Studios, Los Angeles; Remote Control Productions, Santa Monica, California
- Genre: Film score; film soundtrack
- Length: 63:54
- Label: WaterTower Music
- Producer: Hans Zimmer; Rupert Gregson-Williams

Hans Zimmer chronology
Mr. Morgan's Last Love (2013)	Winter's Tale (2014)	Son of God (2014)

Rupert Gregson-Williams chronology
Grown Ups 2 (2013)	Winter's Tale (2014)	Blended (2014)

Winter's Tale (Original Motion Picture Soundtrack) is the film score composed by Hans Zimmer and Rupert Gregson-Williams to the 2014 film Winter's Tale directed by Akiva Goldsman in his feature directorial debut, and starring Colin Farrell, Jessica Brown Findlay, Jennifer Connelly, William Hurt, Eva Marie Saint, Russell Crowe and Will Smith. The soundtrack featured 14 tracks from their score and an original song "Miracle" by KT Tunstall. It was released through WaterTower Music digitally on February 4, 2014 and in physical formats on February 11.

== Development ==
Hans Zimmer composed the film score owing to his trust with screenwriter Akiva Goldsman. Zimmer described the film, a "great romantic love story", a genre which he had never explored since Hannibal (2001), which Zimmer humorously described it as a "romantic comedy" though the film is actually a horror film; he indicated it, due to the relationship with Hannibal Lecter and Clarice Starling. Describing it a completely traditional score, with proper tunes, melodies and orchestration, Zimmer emphasized on the use of stronger melodic themes rather than focusing on atmospheric soundscapes. Though Zimmer wrote most of the themes, he had to depart the project midway owing to his commitments to 12 Years a Slave (2013) and The Amazing Spider-Man 2 (2014). Hence Zimmer's protégé Rupert Gregson-Williams composed the remaining cues as well as developing Zimmer's themes.

KT Tunstall wrote an original song titled "Miracle" which was released as a single on February 11, 2014.

== Reception ==
Filmtracks wrote "The instrumentation and thematic constructs were there to make a winner, and the lack of their application into a truly congealed, obvious narrative arc will bother some film music collectors, but Winter's Tale will reward you upon further examination and beg for rearrangement into a condensed presentation." Thom Jurek of AllMusic wrote "Full of classical and electronic textures, ambiences, and melodies that wed both the lyric themes of 19th century folk and classical music to the early 20th, these 14 cues are, by turns, delicate and dramatic, melancholy and romantic, spare and elegant. As a piece of music it stands on its own."

Rockford Register Star called it "a romantically lush score by Oscar-winner Hans Zimmer that always tells you just how to feel." Todd McCarthy of The Hollywood Reporter and Justin Chang of Variety described the score "ethereal" and "blooming". A. O. Scott of The New York Times considered the music to be overwhelming and manipulative. Joyce Glasser of Mature Times called it a "passionate score".

== Track listing ==
No.	Title	Length
1.	"Look Closely"	6:08
2.	"It's The Ripples That Give The Work Meaning"	2:29
3.	"Rise Up"	2:04
4.	"Hello You Beauty"	2:32
5.	"What's The Best Thing You've Ever Stolen"	1:42
6.	"I Love Blood On The Snow"	6:42
7.	"Princess Bed"	2:19
8.	"Can You Hear Your Heart"	4:14
9.	"This Isn't Right"	4:00
10.	"You Don't Quit Me, Boy"	3:46
11.	"Light As A Feather"	7:41
12.	"She Was Like A Bright Light"	1:35
13.	"The Girl With The Red Hair"	4:04
14.	"Becoming Stars"	10:06
15.	"Miracle" (KT Tunstall)	4:32
Total length:		63:54

== Personnel ==
Credits adapted from liner notes:

- Music composer and producer – Hans Zimmer, Rupert Gregson-Williams
- Additional music – David Buckley, Halli Cauthery
- Synth programming – Hans Zimmer
- Score wrangler – Bob Badami
- Recordist – Kevin Globerman
- Recording and mixing – Alan Meyerson
- Mixing assistance – Christian Wenger
- Mastering – Gavin Lurssen
- Score editor – Christopher Brooks, Katie Greathouse
- Technical engineer – Chuck Choi, James Allen Roberson
- Executive producer – Akiva Goldsman
- Musical assistance – Cynthia Park
- Studio manager – Shalini Singh
- Music production services – Steven Kofsky
- Music preparation – Booker White
- Art direction – Sandeep Sriram
- Music business affairs executive – Lisa Margolis
- Executive in charge of music (WaterTower Music) – Jason Linn
- Executive in charge of music (Warner Bros. Pictures) – Niki Sherrod, Paul Broucek

Orchestra

- Orchestra – The Hollywood Studio Symphony
- Orchestrator – Alastair King, David Butterworth
- Conductor – Nick Glennie-Smith
- Contractor – Peter Rotter
- Concertmaster – Bruce Dukov

Instruments

- Bass – Bruce Morgenthaler, Christian Kollgaard, Drew Dembowski, Edward Meares, Michael Valerio
- Cello – Andrew Shulman, Armen Ksajikian, Cecilia Tsan, Dennis Karmazyn, Erika Duke-Kirkpatrick, George Kim Scholes, Paula Hochhalter, Stan Sharp, Steve Erdody, Timothy Loo, Trevor Handy, Xiaodan Zheng
- Clarinet – Donald Foster, Joshua Ranz, Stuart Clark
- Flute – David Shostac, Geraldine Rotella
- Harp – Jo Ann Turovsky, Marcia Dickstein
- Horn – Brian O'Connor, Corbin Wagner, Daniel Kelley, David Everson, Dylan Hart, Jenny Kim, Laura Brenes, Mark Adams, Steven Becknell
- Oboe – Lara Wickes
- Trombone – Alexander Iles, Phillip Keen, Steven Holtman, William Booth, William Reichenbach
- Tuba – Doug Tornquist, Lukas Storm
- Viola – Andrew Duckles, Brian Dembow, Darrin McCann, David Walther, Matthew Funes, Meredith Crawford, Michael Nowak, Robert Brophy, Roland Kato, Shawn Mann, Thomas Diener
- Viola da gamba – David Buckley
