= If Only (KT Tunstall song) =

Single by KT Tunstall

from the album Drastic Fantastic
- B-side: "Walk Like an Egyptian"; "The Prayer"
- Released: 3 March 2008
- Genre: Alternative rock; pop rock
- Length: 3:46
- Label: Relentless; Virgin
- Songwriters: KT Tunstall; Jimmy Hogarth
- Producer: Steve Osborne

KT Tunstall UK singles chronology
"Saving My Face" (2007)	"If Only" (2008)	"(Still a) Weirdo" (2010)

KT Tunstall US singles chronology
"Saving My Face" (2007)	"If Only" (2008)	"Fade Like a Shadow" (2010)

"If Only" is a 2008 single released by Scottish singer KT Tunstall, and released as the third single from her second studio album Drastic Fantastic (2007). The song was written by Tunstall and Jimmy Hogarth, and was released as the album's third and final single (not counting "Little Favours" which was released as a promotional single in Brazil only) in the United Kingdom on 3 March 2008. In her native Scotland, "If Only" debuted at No. 15 on the Scottish Singles Charts, and reached No. 45 on the UK Singles Chart.

== Background ==
"If Only" first appeared as a track on Tunstall's second unreleased demo album, Toons March '03. The demo version of "If Only" is markedly different from the version found on Drastic Fantastic, with a mellower sound and slightly slower tempo and Tunstall having a slightly higher tone to her voice. For a period of time, prior to the release of Eye to the Telescope, the demo versions of "If Only" and "Other Side of the World" were available for download free of charge on Tunstall's website. In 2018 it was used in the Hallmark Channel movie "Winter's Dream" starring Dean Cain. The songs lyrical composition is largely around the "what if" scenario people may face when trying to make a decision, or indeed for something. Additionally, it also suggests a lyrical meaning of someone reflecting on a life event which could have had a different outcomes entirely, "if only" fate allowed it do so.

"If Only" is reportedly one of KT Tunstall's favourite songs on Drastic Fantastic. Rowan Collinson of the BBC commented that "If Only", along with album track "Little Favours", seemed to be performed in such a style which would be beneficial during live performances, and marked a shift in direction from her debut album Eye to the Telescope (2004).

== Promotion ==
=== Live performances ===
Following the release of "If Only", Tunstall undertook a series of live performances and promotional appearances in support of the single during 2008. The single was released in the United Kingdom on 3 March 2008 through Relentless Records and was subsequently promoted through radio, live performances, television appearances and digital releases. Tunstall performed "If Only" as part of her iTunes Live from SoHo performances in 2008. The resulting live recording, Live from Soho, was released exclusively through the iTunes Store in May 2008 and included "If Only" alongside performances of songs from Drastic Fantastic and her debut album Eye to the Telescope. The performances formed part of a series of intimate sessions staged at AIR Studios in London between 21 February and 2 March 2008, with Tunstall appearing alongside guitarist Leo Abrahams.

The song also featured in Tunstall's live performances during her UK touring activities in April 2008. Contemporary concert records from the period show "If Only" being performed during the tour, alongside material including "Saving My Face", "Hold On", "Other Side of the World" and "Suddenly I See". The timing of the tour coincided with the single's release campaign and provided a further opportunity to promote the song through live performances.

=== Music video ===
Tunstall preparing for her ski jump in the music video

The music video for "If Only" was directed by James Caddick and released in March 2008. It was filmed at the Lysgårdsbakken Olympic Ski Jump in Lillehammer, Norway. The video depicts Tunstall competing in a ski-flying championship as a ski jumper, and combines footage filmed for the video in Norway with footage from Werner Herzog's 1973 documentary The Great Ecstasy of Woodcarver Steiner, which centres on Austrian ski jumper Walter Steiner. The central sequence shows Tunstall attempting a ski jump before suffering a spectacular crash. The video ends with Tunstall being helped to her feet after the accident, with blood visible on her face, before she smiles towards the camera.

=== Radio ===
"If Only" was added to BBC Radio 2's playlist during February 2008 and remained part of the station's programming during the period surrounding its March release. The single's physical release also incorporated material derived from earlier live and radio performances, with the CD and digital editions including a live version of "Walk Like an Egyptian" by The Bangles which was recorded at the Liverpool Academy, while the 7-inch release included Tunstall's BBC Radio 1 Live Lounge recording of "The Prayer". Tunstall also continued to undertake interviews and promotional appearances around the release of Drastic Fantastic and "If Only". In an interview with LAist during the album's promotional period, she identified "If Only" as her favourite song from the album at the time, describing it as challenging to perform and noting the number of possible interpretations she saw within the song. The song's inclusion in a number of live and acoustic recordings during 2008 reflected its importance within the promotional campaign for the album's final single.

In addition to the 2008 live sessions and tour, her wider promotional activity surrounding Drastic Fantastic included appearances on television and radio programmes, continuing the performance-based promotional strategy that had characterised her career since the breakthrough of "Black Horse and the Cherry Tree". Although "If Only" received considerably less chart exposure than Tunstall's earlier singles, its promotion nevertheless extended across radio airplay, intimate digital live sessions, touring and physical releases containing live material.

== Reception ==
=== Commercial response ===
In the United Kingdom, "If Only" spent two weeks within the UK Singles Charts Top 100, following its debut at number forty-five on 15 March 2008. In its second and final week on the chart, it fell to sixty-eight before falling out of the UK Top 100. Additionally, it spent two weeks within the Top 100 of the UK Singles Downloads Charts, following a debut chart position of number fifty-three, and four weeks within the Top 100 of the UK Physical Singles Charts, following a debut appearance at number twenty-five. In her native Scotland, it debuted at number fifteen on the Scottish Singles Charts.

=== Critical reception ===
"If Only" received a mixed to generally favourable response from music critics. Contemporary reviews differed over the song's polished pop-rock production, with some critics praising its melody and accessibility while others considered its commercial sound less distinctive than Tunstall's earlier work. The song was positively received by Channel 4, which awarded it eight out of ten and praised its "chirpy chorus and beaming harmonies". Christopher Hammer of AllGigs.co.uk gave the single three out of five, describing it as an "[almost] perfect song for a lazy Sunday afternoon drive". Sarah Walters of the Manchester Evening News was more critical, awarding the single two out of five. Walters characterised the track as "chart-ready pop" and criticised its "bah-bah-bah backing vocals", arguing that the approach represented a step backwards from the sound of Tunstall's earlier material.

The song was also discussed favourably in contemporary reviews of its parent album, Drastic Fantastic. Stephen Thomas Erlewine of AllMusic characterised the album as a move towards the brighter and more pop-oriented qualities of Tunstall's earlier singles, and included "If Only" among the album's tracks. Betty Clarke of The Guardian described "If Only" and "Little Favours" as examples of the album's Sheryl Crow-influenced, mid-tempo rock style, while praising Tunstall's vocal performance but expressing reservations about the album's polished direction.

The broader critical reception of Drastic Fantastic was generally favourable. Metacritic recorded a score of 68 out of 100 from 22 professional reviews, categorising the album's reception as "generally favourable"; several of the aggregated reviews commented on the album's more polished and pop-oriented sound.

=== Legacy ===
At the 2008 UK Music Video Awards held in London on 14 October 2008, "If Only" won the award for Best Telecine in a Video, beating nominations from "Sexy! No No No..." by Girls Aloud and "Worried About Ray" by The Hoosiers. In 2023, Classic Rock History magazine listed "If Only" at number six in their list of Top 10 KT Tunstall songs. Millie Zeiler of Classic Rock History described the song as "mellow", and credited is as being "the perfect daydreamer-type song that allows the listener to embark on a musical journey of their own".

== Accolades ==
Year	Award	Category	Result
2008	UK Music Video Awards	Best Telecine in a Video	Won

== Track listing ==
These are the formats and track listings of single releases of "If Only".

UK CD single
(Released 3 March 2008)

1. "If Only"
2. "Walk Like an Egyptian" (Live in Liverpool)

7" vinyl single
(Released 3 March 2008)

1. "If Only"
2. "The Prayer" (Radio 1 Live Lounge)

Digital download
(Released 3 March 2008)

1. "If Only"
2. "Walk Like an Egyptian" (Live in Liverpool)

Promo CD

1. "If Only" (Radio Edit) 3:30
2. "If Only" 3:46
3. "If Only" (Instrumental) 3:46

== Charts ==
Chart (2008)	Peak position
Scotland Singles (OCC)	15
UK Singles (OCC)	45
Ukrainian Singles	12
UK Singles Downloads (OCC)	53
UK Physical Singles (OCC)	25
