= Miracle (KT Tunstall song) =

Song by KT Tunstall

from the album The Winter's Tale soundtrack
- Released: 11 February 2014
- Recorded: January 2014
- Genre: Pop
- Length: 4:32
- Label: Universal
- Songwriter: KT Tunstall
- Producer: KT Tunstall

"Miracle" is a song by Scottish recording artist KT Tunstall for the film Winter's Tale. It was released on 11 February 2014. The song is the second soundtrack written and released by Tunstall after The Kid's "Boy", and marks a new orientation in Tunstall's career after her fifth release Invisible Empire // Crescent Moon.

== Background ==
After the release of "Made of Glass" in December 2013, Tunstall had announced she would take a break with her album-writing career after her fifth studio album Invisible Empire // Crescent Moon. In an interview, she said she wanted to take a break with her musical career, and that she was aiming at writing soundtracks for movies.

== Composition ==
Tunstall composed and recorded the demo of the song on her laptop while on tour. She said, "It was a great, last-minute thing when I was on my tour bus and I managed to get it all together, quickly, in my bunk. I like a bit of pressure, writing to demand, otherwise I just sit and doodle about. I haven't met the actors yet, but maybe at the premiere I'll be like, 'Hi Will Smith, Hi Russell Crowe.'"

The song is a piano ballad that fits with the romanticism of the movie.
