= Push That Knot Away =

Song by KT Tunstall

from the album Tiger Suit
- Released: 27 September 2010
- Recorded: 2009–2010
- Genre: Indie pop, folktronica, roots rock
- Length: 3:46
- Label: Virgin
- Songwriter: KT Tunstall
- Producer: Jim Abbiss

"Push That Knot Away" is a 2010 song by Scottish singer/songwriter KT Tunstall. Though it was not recorded as a single, it is a very important song in her third studio album Tiger Suit (2010). The song premiered on Tunstall's YouTube channel on 9 July 2010 with a non-official video taken from the documentary "How to Make a Tiger Suit" (available in the Deluxe Edition of the album).

== Background ==
The song is played live for the first time at MacSorley's, in Glasgow on 18 June 2010. Tunstall shouted at the audience "If you like the song, put your thumbs up, and if you don't, put them down." As she played the song live, she recorded her performance in her documentary "How to Make a Tiger Suit".

On 9 July 2010, Push That Knot Away was the first song ever broadcast online from Tiger Suit by Tunstall herself. By broadcasting this video online, she aimed at show her new musical abilities. As the video is online, she writes about it: "There's no way I could wait til September before you heard anything!! The song's called "Push That Knot Away" - it's a signature track on the album for me, as it was one of my first attempts at mixing a picked acoustic tune with electronica. Big, magic step for me. Hope you dig it, as well as some little snippets of the film I've made over the last year which you'll be able to get your mitts on when the record comes out. Love KT"

As Push That Knot Away was available online, the song was used as a background in all of the promotional videos of Tiger Suit, and started being played live.

The song features on Tunstall's Live in London March 2011 album

== Reception ==
On 15 July, Rolling Stone magazine said that with the release of "Push That Knot Away", "the Scottish songstress ditches coffee-shop-flavored folk for a big dose of booming beats, electro textures and fuzzed-out bass", stating that "it's nice to hear Tunstall stepping out of her comfort zone: "Push That Knot Away" is a rousing, foot-stomping anthem". However, they think that, lyrically, "Tunstall is still mired in confessional singer-songwriter clichés that are better suited for a therapist's office."

The Scotsman review says that "There is a certain pagan freedom cantering through "Push That Knot Away". while Slant Magazine says that "she belts and growls with real conviction" with the song. The website Ultimate Guitar said that "Push That Knot Away" "veers into inspirational territory".
