= The Scarlet Tulip EP =

EP by KT Tunstall
- Released: 1 May 2011
- Recorded: 11 April 2011
- Genre: Acoustic; folk
- Length: 22:59
- Label: Independent
- Producer: KT Tunstall; Luke Bullen

KT Tunstall chronology
Live in London March 2011 (2011)	The Scarlet Tulip EP (2011)	Invisible Empire // Crescent Moon (2013)

The Scarlet Tulip EP is a 2011 EP studio release from KT Tunstall, recorded in her home studio in April 2011. The album was recorded and produced by Tunstall, co-produced by Luke Bullen and mastered by Jeremy Cooper.

== Background ==
Tunstall wrote all of the songs on the EP, notably recording each in a single take in her solar-powered studio in the Berkshire countryside.

The EP project was borne out of Tunstall's desire to record some songs she had written during the recording of Tiger Suit and which were not included on the final album. "The Hidden Heart" was written for the naturalist Bruce Parry's Survival project, "to try and gain land protection for indigenous people of the Amazon," she said. All songs are played on acoustic guitar except for "Shanty of the Whale", which Tunstall performed a cappella.

== Live performances of The Scarlet Tulip EP tracks ==
Tunstall started playing some of The Scarlet Tulip EP songs during her gigs, often still performing "The Punk", "Scarlet Tulip" and "The Hidden Heart". The latter was first performed during a concert in Ireland in 2008, subsequently featuring in the compilation Songs for Survival with Piotr Lisiecki singing. The track also features in her 2011 live-to-tape concert recording Live in London March 2011; it was after this time that Tunstall recorded the song for the EP.

After its release, Tunstall continued playing "The Hidden Heart" as part of her 2011 solo tour. Tunstall also sang it as she launched the countdown to the WWF Earth Hour at the Westfield London.

Tunstall played "Alchemy" for her following live album Live Islington Assembly Hall. She continues to play songs from The Scarlet Tulip EP live to this day, including "Shanty of the Whale" in 2013 and "Patience" in 2021.

== Track listing ==
All tracks are written by KT Tunstall.

No.	Title	Length
1.	"The Punk"	2:10
2.	"Skinny Lou"	2:26
3.	"The Hidden Heart"	4:00
4.	"Scarlet Tulip"	4:16
5.	"Patience"	3:18
6.	"Alchemy"	3:59
7.	"Shanty of the Whale"	2:50
Total length:		22:59
