= Made of Glass (song) =

Single by KT Tunstall

from the album Invisible Empire // Crescent Moon
- Released: 16 December 2013
- Recorded: April 2012
- Genre: Acoustic rock; blues; country folk
- Length: 4:11
- Label: Virgin
- Songwriter(s): KT Tunstall
- Producer(s): KT Tunstall; Howe Gelb

KT Tunstall singles chronology
"Invisible Empire" (2013)	"Made of Glass" (2013)	"Come On, Get In" (2013)

"Made of Glass" is the fourth and last single from KT Tunstall's Invisible Empire // Crescent Moon. The song was first played acoustically on BBC Radio 2 with Jo Whiley on 13 May 2013 along with "Feel It All" and "Invisible Empire", the two previous singles from the album. A music video was released on 11 November 2013.

== Composition ==
The song is an acoustic ballad dealing with death and fragility of life, since the album deals with mortality. Additionally, the song is said by Tunstall to have been written in response to the death of a friend from cancer who had given her a cut-glass vase prior to his death. She claimed that the gift was ironic in the aftermath of his death, saying that the one thing she had been left from her friend during his lifetime ultimately became the most "breakable thing I own".

"Made of Glass" is one of the only songs Tunstall had written before the writing process of Invisible Empire // Crescent Moon with "Yellow Flower". On an interview with Jo Whiley, she explained that she had been trying to write the song for years without succeeding. Then, her sick dad offered her a fancy vase to carry flowers. She explained that it was one of the most beautiful gifts she ever received from him, but also the most fragile. Then, the inspiration came from that fragile and fancy vase, carrying flowers.

The song was recorded on the first recording session, in April 2012, where Tunstall recorded the song totally acoustically with old tape machines. She resorted to a friend for the whistling part.

== Promotion ==
"Made of Glass" is one of the most played and promoted songs along with "Feel It All", "Invisible Empire", and "Crescent Moon". She first played it live on the radio, acoustically on 29 April 2013, on BBC Radio 2, on the Ken Bruce Show with "Invisible Empire", "Crescent Moon" and "Feel It All". She played it to almost every TV and internet appearance she has made (Yahoo, KFOG...). "Made of Glass" is also a part of the Invisible Empire // Crescent Moon Tour and features the live album Live Islington Assembly Hall CD.

== Track listing ==
Digital download
No.	Title	Writer(s)	Producer(s)	Length
1.	""Made of Glass""	KT Tunstall	KT Tunstall, Howe Gelb	4:11
Total length:				3:52

== Release history ==
Region	Date	Label	Format
Worldwide	19 August 2013	Virgin	digital download
