= Sounds of the Season: The KT Tunstall Holiday Collection =

Have Yourself a Very KT Christmas

EP by KT Tunstall
- Released: 14 October 2007
- Recorded: 2007
- Genre: Alternative rock; pop; Christmas music
- Length: 20:58
- Label: Relentless
- Producer: KT Tunstall; Luke Bullen; Richard Morris

KT Tunstall chronology
Drastic Fantastic (2007)	Have Yourself a Very KT Christmas (2007)	Tiger Suit (2010)

Sounds of the Season: The KT Tunstall Holiday Collection is a 2007 EP studio release from KT Tunstall, later retitled Have Yourself a Very KT Christmas.

Following the release of Drastic Fantastic in September 2007, Tunstall recorded this EP as a tribute to fans. It was released on 14 October 2007 in the U.S. in partnership with NBC as a physical EP and was originally only available at the American discount department store chain Target, whereas in Europe, it was released as a digital download EP under the title Have Yourself a Very KT Christmas on 10 December 2007 .

It did not chart in Europe, but in the United States the EP peaked at No. 92 at the Billboard 200. The song "Sleigh Ride" was broadcast in Good Morning America on "This Week's Soundtrack" on 17 December 2010. On 23 December 2010, she also performed the song at the Archbishop of York's house on The Chris Evans Breakfast Show on BBC Radio 2 and also performed "2000 Miles".

During Christmas 2011, as she broadcast the link to her EP on her Facebook page, the sales of the EP climbed again, four years after its release.

== Track listing ==
No.	Title	Writer(s)	Length
1.	"2000 Miles" (Pretenders cover)	Chrissie Hynde	3:40
2.	"Christmas (Baby Please Come Home)" (Darlene Love cover)	Jeff Barry, Ellie Greenwich, Phil Spector	2:26
3.	"Mele Kalikimaka (Christmas in Hawaii)"	Robert Alexander Anderson	3:25
4.	"Sleigh Ride"	Leroy Anderson	2:47
5.	"Fairytale of New York" (featuring Ed Harcourt) (The Pogues cover)	Shane MacGowan, Jem Finer	4:23
6.	"Lonely This Christmas" (Mud cover)	Nicky Chinn, Mike Chapman	4:17
Total length:			20:58

== Release history ==
Country	Release date
United States	14 October 2007
Europe	10 December 2007

== Chart positions ==
Chart (2007)	Peak position
U.S Billboard 200 Albums	92
