= Million Dollar Arm (soundtrack) =

Million Dollar Arm (Original Motion Picture Soundtrack)

Soundtrack album by A. R. Rahman
- Released: May 13, 2014
- Recorded: 2013–February 2014
- Studios: Panchathan Record Inn and AM Studios, Chennai; Panchathan Hollywood Studios, Los Angeles
- Genre: World music
- Length: 45:28
- Languages: English, Tamil
- Label: Walt Disney
- Producers: A. R. Rahman; Mitchell Leib; Craig Gillespie; Joe Roth; Mark Ciardi; Gordon Gray

A. R. Rahman chronology
Kochadaiiyaan (2014)	Million Dollar Arm (Original Motion Picture Soundtrack) (2014)	Lekar Hum Deewana Dil (2014)

Singles from Million Dollar Arm (Original Motion Picture Soundtrack)
- 1. "We Could Be Kings" Released: May 12, 2014

Million Dollar Arm (Original Motion Picture Soundtrack) is the soundtrack album of the American biographical sports film of the same name, directed by Craig Gillespie. A. R. Rahman composed all seven of the original songs as well as the score for the film. Artists Iggy Azalea, KT Tunstall, Wale, Sukhwinder Singh, Raghav Mathur have collaborated with the composer for the soundtrack. Kendrick Lamar also recorded a song that is featured only in the film. The soundtrack album was digitally released by Walt Disney Records on May 13, 2014, followed by a CD release on May 19.

== Development ==
Director Craig Gillespie said that he had been hoping to recruit A. R. Rahman to do the music right from the time the former signed the Disney film to helm the project. In an interview with CBS News, Rahman stated that the film's scale was very attractive to him. He began composing for the film's score in 2013, setting seven queues of score to be featured on the soundtrack album. Eventually, the number of tracks increased as per screenplay length. The recording of the score was completed by February 2014. On working for the film he stated, "For three years, I was avoiding Indian-based subjects in Hollywood as I was anyway doing them in Hindi. The last thing I wanted was to be typecast as a composer who'd only work on English films with an Indian setting. But when this script came along, I thought it was a good time to start again. It helped that the story was also hybrid in nature. Million Dollar Arm is more contemporary. In terms of music, it is more orchestral."

In regards to the soundtrack album, Rahman claimed, "The soundtrack we created together truly captures the beautiful culture and energy behind the film— reminding us all how important it is to be open to new possibilities in life." As the film's music has Indian as well as Western sensibilities, Rahman wanted to strike a balance between the two. The track "Unborn Children" is the song "Thirakkadha Kaatu Kulle" sung by K. S. Chithra and P. Unnikrishnan, featured in the 1999 film En Swasa Kaatre scored by Rahman. As a score, it is featured in the ending of the film where two kids were running into an open field. Upon inclusion of such a track, in an interview with The Hindu Rahman said, "Frankly, I really didn't know how it landed there and the makers were researching my Indian music and must've stumbled upon this. When I saw the movie, I was like, 'Wow, where did that come from!' But it felt so good. I didn't feel any need to change it." He added that he never wanted to use the soothing number from the Tamil film but the director and music supervisor loved the tune and they've used it as part of the soundtrack. The track "Nimma Nimma" was recorded for Isles of Wonder, however, here the track is reused with slight changes in musical arrangement. On the collaborations with artists in the soundtrack, Disney listed names for featured collaboration whereas director Craig and composer Rahman made the choices together. On the score and the film plot analogy Rahman quotes, "The songs add to the energy of the scenes and the score in places...We were careful not to telegraph key emotions and gave way to the actors playing characters to lead the emotion." On his collaboration with the rapper Wale, Rahman stated that he was writing a lot of song ideas and the film director was suggesting that they should have a mainstream rapper for certain sequences especially when the all the boys in film go to America. He was quoted saying, "So Wale's name popped up, we sent him the track and he loved it and did the rap and sent it back." Singer Gaayatri Kaundinya has lent alaps to the score. She stated that she started interning with film composer A. R. Rahman at his studio in Los Angeles since 2012 and eventually got involved with the project. She added that it didn't take her long to record everything as she had many demo works with Rahman, earlier. In the album of the score her voice is featured in tracks "Farewell" and "Bobbleheads" but in the score itself she had about six to eight pieces. In the interview with Daily Bruin, she recalled, "Originally we just put it in for the part where they find the two men to pitch at the speed that (the baseball scouts) want. After months of looking for cricket players, they find players who can throw at this incredibly fast speed. That's what the track was recorded for. But the director liked (the track) so much that they ended up using it for the opening of the movie."

== Reception ==
The score received positive critical reception. Scott Foundas of Variety praised the score by comparing, "As far as the film's saturated color palette is concerned, jubilant wall-to-wall is the song score by Oscar-winning composer A. R. Rahman". Upon release of the single "Keep The Hustle", critic Sarah Polonsky for Vibe wrote, "A mishmash of elements that fuse Indian music with the big synth of electronica, all set under Wale's boss lyrics", reviewing the score as, "This is one of those film scores that come around every decade and knocks it out of the ballpark not only with powerful tunes, but also, through encompassing a generation's zeitgeist. In 2014, modern music is a sonic free-for-all, and Million Dollar Arm's soundtrack could easily serve as a blueprint to today's genre-varied ethos and creative landscape." Critic Rajeev Masand for CNN-IBN writes, "AR Rahman's soundtrack fits in nicely with the narrative." On contrary to positive reviews, at India Today, Suhani Singh noted, "AR Rahman's score is mishmash, drawing sounds from everywhere leaving the soundtrack with no standout track." Venky Vembu at The Hindu wrote, "A.R. Rahman's background score is mood elevating with haunting melodies." At The American Bazaar, Deepak Chitnis pointed out, "A.R. Rahman's score is mostly bland, with little differentiating it from his Slumdog Millionaire work". Udita Jhunjhunwala for The Wall Street Journal writes, "A.R. Rahman's soundtrack adds to mood and rhythm to the action and comedy" Tara Agrawal at Business of Cinema stated, "The scenes shot in India are reminiscent of Slumdog Millionaire, augmented by A.R. Rahman's impressive soundtrack (including a sample of 'Ringa Ringa' in one scene)." At The Indian Express, critic Suanshu Khurana noted, "Overall the album works, not just as a soundtrack, but also as an audio by triumphing on some meditative moments. What it lacks, on some occasions, is the profundity we were looking for."

== Track listing ==
All music is composed by A. R. Rahman.

Million Dollar Arm (Original Motion Picture Soundtrack)
No.	Title	Lyrics	Artist(s)	Length
1.	"Makhna"		A. R. Rahman, Sukhwinder Singh	3:20
2.	"Million Dollar Dream"		A. R. Rahman, Sukhwinder Singh, Iggy Azalea	2:44
3.	"Unborn Children"	Vairamuthu	A. R. Rahman, P. Unnikrishnan, K. S. Chithra	4:37
4.	"We Could Be Kings"		KT Tunstall, A. R. Rahman	3:08
5.	"Taa Taa Tai"		A. R. Rahman	3:25
6.	"Keep the Hustle"		A. R. Rahman, Wale, Raghav	3:09
7.	"Nimma Nimma"		A. R. Rahman	2:29
8.	"Bobbleheads"		A. R. Rahman	1:59
9.	"Never Give Up"		A. R. Rahman	2:21
10.	"Lucknow"		A. R. Rahman	1:50
11.	"Farewell"		A. R. Rahman	2:10
12.	"Desi Thoughts"		A. R. Rahman	2:51
13.	"First Tryout"		A. R. Rahman	2:30
14.	"Calling Scouts Again"		A. R. Rahman	1:39
Total length:				45:28

== Album credits ==
Credits adapted from AllMusic.

- A. R. Rahman - Composer, Primary Artist, Producer, Soundtrack Producer, Vocals

Vocal & music personnel

- Gaayatri Kaudinya - Vocals (tracks 8 & 11)
- Neeti Mohan - Backing vocals (track 1)
- Asad Khan - Sitar
- Matt Dunkley - Orchestration
- Nick Glennie-Smith - Choir Conductor
- Prasanna Ramaswamy - Electric guitar

Technical personnel

- Bryan Carrigan - Digital Recording
- T.R. Krishna Chetan - Programming
- Ishaan Chhabra - Music Assistant, Programming
- Joel Iwataki - Mixing, Recording
- Tony Joy - Assistant Engineer, Mixing Assistant
- Srinidhi Venkatesh - Engineer
- Nitish Kumar - Engineer
- Stephen Marcussen - Mastering
- Jon Mooney - Music Editor, Music Supervisor
- Suresh Permal - Engineer
- Booker White - Music Preparation

Production

- A. R. Rahman - Soundtrack Producer
- Mark Ciardi - Executive Soundtrack Producer
- Craig Gillespie - Executive Soundtrack Producer
- Gordon Gray - Executive Soundtrack Producer
- Joe Roth - Executive Soundtrack Producer
- Mitchell Leib - Executive in Charge of Music, Soundtrack Producer
- Peter Rotter - Music Contractor

Promotions

- Scott Holtzman & Don Welty - Legal Advisor, Music Business Affairs

Artistic personnel

Dabboo Ratnani - Photography
