= Feel It All =

Single by KT Tunstall

from the album Invisible Empire // Crescent Moon
- Released: 29 April 2013 DL 10 June 2013 CD
- Recorded: 2012
- Genre: Acoustic rock; blues; country folk
- Length: 4:10 (album version); 3:49 (radio edit)
- Label: Virgin
- Songwriter: KT Tunstall
- Producers: Howe Gelb; KT Tunstall; Additional production by Martin Terefe (radio edit)

KT Tunstall singles chronology
""Glamour Puss"" (2010)	"Feel It All" (2013)	"Invisible Empire" (2013)

"Feel It All" is a song by Scottish recording artist KT Tunstall. It was released as the UK lead single from her fourth studio album Invisible Empire // Crescent Moon, on 29 April 2013 through iTunes on 1 May 2013 through Amazon, and was released as a physical single on 10 June 2013. The cover for the single depicts Tunstall in a desert, with minimal outfits, wild-looking, pointing out the natural, acoustic influences of the album.

Teaming up with PJ Harvey collaborator John Parish on the drums, Tunstall recorded one of her most personal and intimate songs along with "(Still a) Weirdo", from her previous record, Tiger Suit. A music video was released on 29 April 2013 on Vevo, it was shot in the Sonoran Desert near Tucson, Arizona, in which she recorded Invisible Empire // Crescent Moon. The song was first played on the radio on 29 April 2013, on BBC Radio 2, on the Ken Bruce Show.

== Composition ==
"Feel It All" was recorded twice. The first version is the album version, which was described by Tunstall as a more stripped back and melancholic. The second release of the song, the "Band Jam" version, described as a much more joyful version, was chosen for the music video and the radio release. At first, Tunstall thought she would keep only one of the two versions, but then she chose to keep both of them, and to release the band jam as the lead single.

The album version features country music and folk influence, with a slow tempo, while the "Band Jam" version is influenced with more pop/folk sounds, and a faster rhythm. Tunstall described the song as "the most personal song on the album" and adds "it was really medicine for me, that song". Tunstall explained on her appearance to the Ken Bruce Show on BBC Radio 2 that she wrote the song right in the middle of all her personal issues: the death of her father, and her splitting up with her husband Luke Bullen.

== Reception ==
"Feel It All" received critical acclaim from music critics. A French article from described the song as "surprising, but very intense" and compared Tunstall to fellow artists Katie Melua and Feist. The website "Hangout" described the song as a "gorgeous folk track with a beautiful video to accompany it".

== Promotion ==
"Feel It All" was first played on the radio on the Ken Bruce Show (BBC Radio 2) on 29 April 2013, the "Band Jam" version was played. The radio promotion went on the whole UK, with appearances on The Culture Studio with Janice Forysth, BBC Radio Scotland on 13 May, where she played an acoustic version of the song, also, on the Jo Whiley show and with Louise Elliott on BBC Radio Wales on 15 and 16 May.

On 29 May, Tunstall made an appearance on Later... with Jools Holland and performed the song as a teaser of the new album. The song was performed acoustic, with an electric guitar solo.

== Music video ==
Tunstall released two music videos of "Feel It All" : the first is the "Band Jam" version, shot in Sonoran Desert and the second, the album version, was shot in London.

The first music video premiered on 29 April 2013, on her YouTube account, at midday. The video was directed by Isaac Ravishankara, who previously worked with The Lumineers and Ellie Goulding, and it shows a barefoot Tunstall on the edge of a cliff, balancing on a board facing the desert. The video features actor Del Mar Richardson.

On 16 July Tunstall re-released the single with the album version, and made a clip video of her via vimeo. In this clip video, she wanders to a store opened at night, and buys make-up which she uses in order to look like a calavera. Then, she runs to a party with people wearing the same make-up. The website Milky Tea Milk praised the video and said : "that first video (the "Feel It All // Band Jam" video) has been completely bulldozed by the recent revelation of another video for Feel It All. Aside from the video being more intriguing than the first it shows a little bit of vulnerability from Tunstall and some raw emotion." On an interview with the director Alex Kemp, he said "I wanted to explore ideas of the walking dead, escapism and raving, and the vibe of the track felt quite sombre, so we decided to reflect this by using slo-mo as well as embracing the low light conditions of shooting almost entirely night-time exterior."

== Media Usage ==
On 11 August 2013, "Feel It All" was used as the closing credits of the TV series Unforgettable for the season 2 episode "Day of Jackie".

== Charts ==
Chart (2013)	Peak position
Ukrainian Chart	13

== Track listing ==
Digital download
No.	Title	Writer(s)	Producer(s)	Length
1.	"Feel It All"	KT Tunstall	KT Tunstall, Howe Gelb	4:10
2.	"Feel It All // Band Jam" (Radio Edit)	Tunstall	Tunstall, Gelb	3:49
Total length:				7:59
