= Live Islington Assembly Hall =

Live album by KT Tunstall
- Released: 2013
- Recorded: 20 June 2013
- Venue: Islington Assembly Hall (Islington, London)
- Genre: Folk; pop
- Length: 76:20
- Label: EMI

KT Tunstall chronology
Invisible Empire // Crescent Moon (2013)	Live Islington Assembly Hall (2013)	Golden State EP (2016)

Live Islington Assembly Hall is KT Tunstall's fifth live album, recorded on 20 June 2013. It features some tracks from her previous albums, but mostly, new tracks from her 2013 release Invisible Empire // Crescent Moon, and a cover of Don Henley's "The Boys of Summer". Tunstall interacts with the audience, having conversations and making jokes, making the gig feel intimate and personal.

== Release ==
The album was recorded on 20 June 2013 by instant delivery company Abbey Road Studios Live Here Now. Fans were able to purchase the CD at the show and pick it up directly after the show finished. The CD was available through KT Tunstall's online store, the Abbey Road Live Here Now online store and at her live shows.

== Track listing ==
No.	Title	Music	Album	Length
1.	"Invisible Empire"	KT Tunstall	Invisible Empire // Crescent Moon	5:17
2.	"Waiting on the Heart"	KT Tunstall, Howe Gelb	Invisible Empire // Crescent Moon	4:13
3.	"Carried"	KT Tunstall	Invisible Empire // Crescent Moon	4:59
4.	"Other Side of the World"	KT Tunstall, Martin Terefe	Eye to the Telescope	5:09
5.	"Yellow Flower"	KT Tunstall	Invisible Empire // Crescent Moon	3:41
6.	"Through the Dark"	KT Tunstall, Martin Terefe	Eye to the Telescope	3:38
7.	"Black Horse and the Cherry Tree / Seven Nation Army"	KT Tunstall	Eye to the Telescope	9:31
8.	"Alchemy"	KT Tunstall	The Scarlet Tulip EP	4:33
9.	"Honeydew"	KT Tunstall	Invisible Empire // Crescent Moon	3:45
10.	"Feel It All"	KT Tunstall	Invisible Empire // Crescent Moon	4:46
11.	"Boys of Summer (Don Henley cover)"	Don Henley, Mike Campbell		4:56
12.	"Made of Glass"	KT Tunstall	Invisible Empire // Crescent Moon	5:29

Encore
No.	Title	Music	Album	Length
13.	"Crescent Moon"	KT Tunstall	Invisible Empire // Crescent Moon	4:30
14.	"Funnyman"	KT Tunstall, Martin Terefe	Drastic Fantastic	4:44
15.	"Rock Me Amadeus"	Falco, Rob Bolland, Ferdi Bolland		1:25
16.	"Chimes"	KT Tunstall, Howe Gelb	Invisible Empire // Crescent Moon	5:44
