= Invisible Empire // Crescent Moon =

Studio album by KT Tunstall
- Released: 10 June 2013
- Recorded: 2012
- Studios: Wavelab Studios (Tucson, Arizona, USA); Toybox Studios (Bristol, England)
- Genres: Acoustic rock; folk; country folk
- Length: 47:17 (standard version)
- Labels: Virgin EMI; Universal Records (Europe); Blue Note; Universal Records (North America)
- Producers: Howe Gelb; KT Tunstall

KT Tunstall chronology
The Scarlet Tulip EP (2011)	Invisible Empire // Crescent Moon (2013)	Live Islington Assembly Hall (2013)

Singles from Invisible Empire // Crescent Moon
- 1. "Feel It All // Band Jam" Released: 10 June 2013; 2. "Feel It All (Album version)" Released: 16 July 2013; 3. "Invisible Empire" Released: 19 August 2013; 4. "Made of Glass" Released: 16 December 2013

Invisible Empire // Crescent Moon is the fourth studio album by Scottish singer-songwriter KT Tunstall. It was released firstly in Australia and Germany on 7 June 2013, followed by 10 June 2013 across Europe and on 6 August 2013 in the United States. The album debuted at number seven on the national albums chart in her native Scotland, the UK Albums Chart at number fourteen, and number sixty-four on the US Billboard 200. It spawned three singles – "Feel It All", "Invisible Empire" and "Made of Glass".

The album is noted as having a more country folk sound in its composition and lyrical makeup than her previous album, Tiger Suit.

== Background ==
Tunstall announced through Facebook on 20 March 2013 that her official website had been redesigned ready for the new album, scheduled for a June 2013 release by Virgin Records. She also revealed the album cover, in which she is seen from behind in the desert of Tucson, Arizona. The same day, a trailer for the album was revealed on her YouTube page, showing her in the studio and driving around the Tucson desert.

The album was primarily recorded in Tucson with the singer Howe Gelb during two separate sessions in April and November 2012. This has led to the sound of the album naturally separating into two distinct parts – which would explain the title of the album. Tunstall has explained that one side of the record, the Invisible Empire side, deals with the themes of mortality, a subject close to her heart following the death of her father in 2012. The second side, Crescent Moon, evokes an ethereal mood, more reflective of deeply felt changes in outlook and shifts in her personal life following her separation from her husband of four years later that year.

On The Culture Studio programme with Janice Forsyth, Tunstall explained that she had used old reel-to-reel tapes to record the album. "I like the unperfection of it." She said that she recorded the song "Made of Glass" in one take.

== Release ==
=== Promotional materials ===
On 21 March 2013, an article from The Huffington Post website stated that the first single would be titled "Feel It All" and that it would be released in the same week as the album. On 11 April 2013, she revealed on her Facebook page that she was shooting the video for "Feel It All". The video was premiered on her Vevo channel at midday on 29 April 2013; its first radio play was on the BBC Radio 2 Ken Bruce Show. but she also played the song live on Jools Holland's show in the UK and on some other radio shows.

On 16 July 2013, Tunstall offered a new video from the other version of "Feel It All" to re-promote the album, with vimeo-styled sequences. In this clip video, she wanders to a store opened at night, and buys make-up which she uses to look like a skeleton. Then, she runs to a party with people wearing the same make-up. The website Milky Tea Milk praised the video and said, "That first video... has been completely bulldozed by the recent revelation of another video for Feel It All. Aside from the video being more intriguing than the first it shows a little bit of vulnerability from Tunstall and some raw emotion." In an interview, the director Alex Kemp said, "I wanted to explore ideas of the walking dead, escapism and raving, and the vibe of the track felt quite sombre, so we decided to reflect this by using slo-mo as well as embracing the low light conditions of shooting almost entirely night-time exterior."

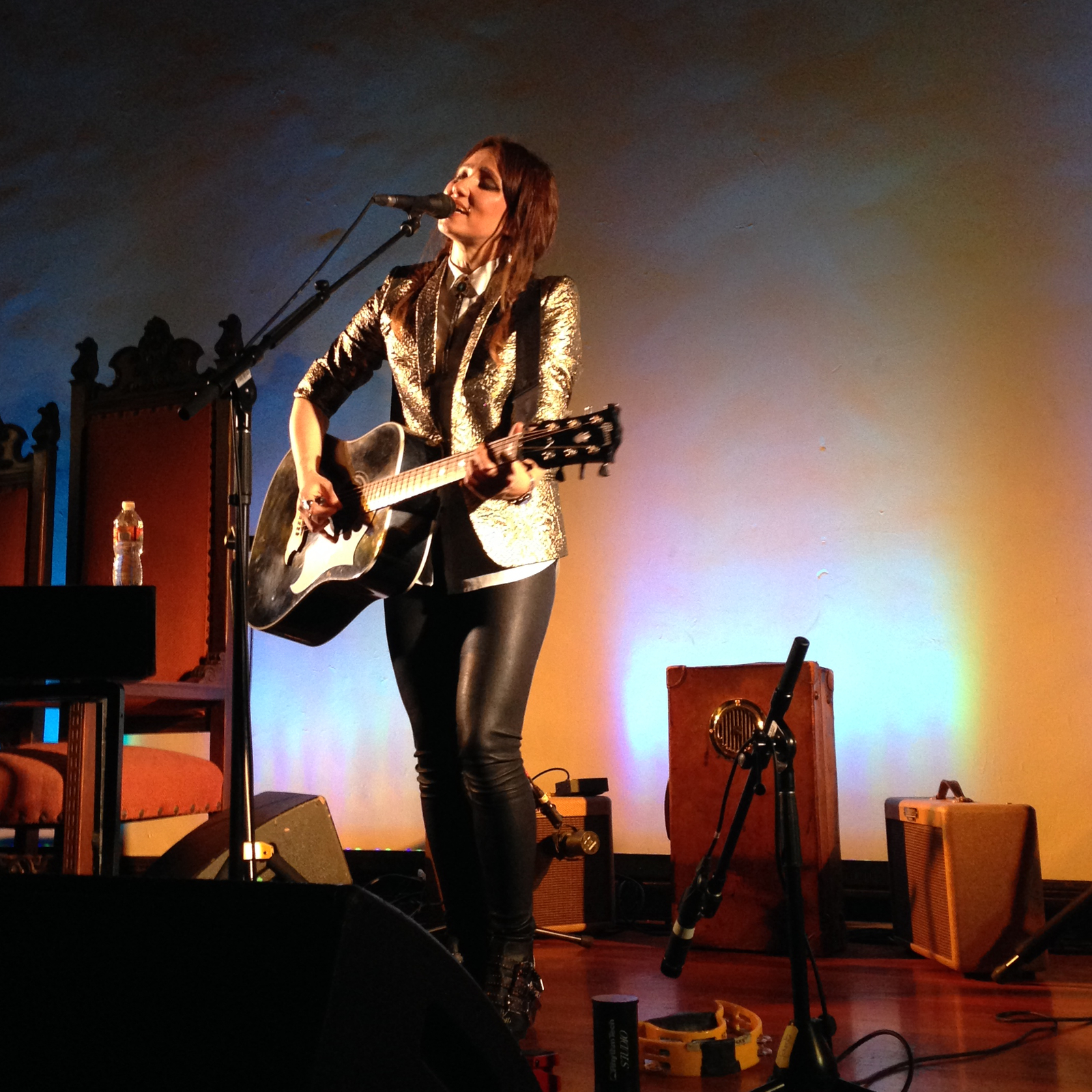
Tunstall performing in October 2013, four months following the albums release

On 21 July, Tunstall announced a new music video for "Invisible Empire" as the third single from the album. A music video was premiered on 30 July before the release of the single on 19 August. It shows Tunstall in a medieval world, fighting with a sword and riding a horse. On 9 November 2013, Tunstall announced the release of a fourth single from Invisible Empire // Crescent Moon, "Made of Glass". A year after the album's release, Tunstall announced in June 2014 that she had shot a new music video for the song "Carried". The video was directed by Chris Turner, who previously directed the "Invisible Empire" and the"Made of Glass" videos. It was supposed to feature the Scottish actor and Game of Thrones star James Cosmo. By June 2023, ten years after the album’s release, the long-awaited project was finally unveiled — not as a music video, but as a short film. Written and directed by Turner and inspired by the track, the film features Cosmo portraying Tunstall’s father. It includes a scene of Tunstall performing an acoustic version of the song, while the album version is played during the closing credits.

=== Broadcast promotion ===
On 16 May, she promoted the song on Welsh radio with an interview with Louise Elliott on BBC Radio Wales. After the broadcast of "Feel It All (Band Jam)" (the version ultimately released for radio play), she explained the inspirations for the album stemming from her personal circumstances and from the Tucson desert. In the week after the release of Invisible Empire // Crescent Moon, Tunstall made appearances on some TV shows to play the lead single, including on Jools Holland and BBC Breakfast.

=== Supporting tour ===
In March 2013, Tunstall announced a UK tour in June and July to promote the album. Initial promotion was via the Internet, where the album's release was announced for June in Europe and Canada with the USA following in August. Most of the earliest promotion was on the radio. On 29 April, the first single, "Feel It All", was the first song from the album to be played on UK radio. She later promoted the album on The Culture Studio with Janice Forsyth (BBC Radio Scotland) on 13 May, where she performed acoustic versions of the album's opening track "Invisible Empire", "Made of Glass", where she explained the inspiration coming from her father's death, and the first acoustic version of "Feel it All". On 15 May, during the Jo Whiley Show, she played "Feel It All" and the Eye to the Telescope song "Other Side of the World".

On 17 May 2013, Tunstall embarked on an Invisible Empire // Crescent Moon Tour to promote the album. Shows were scheduled all over the United Kingdom and United States, though the European and Asian shows were not then planned. On 20 June, Tunstall recorded her next live album after Live in London March 2011. Live Islington Assembly Hall was released on 21 June.

== Reception ==
=== Commercial response ===
In her native Scotland, Invisible Empire // Crescent Moon debuted at number seven on the Scottish Albums Chart, becoming her fourth top ten album in Scotland. In the United Kingdom, the album debuted and peaked at number 14 and stayed 11 weeks in the top 100, longer than her previous album Tiger Suit. In Europe, the album entered the Belgian charts at number 106 in Flanders, and 137 in Wallonia, and climbed to the 51st and 72nd position in its second week, surpassing Eye to the Telescope and Drastic Fantastic; it stayed in the top albums for four weeks. It peaked at number 84 in Netherlands, but failed to enter the German Albums Chart. On its first week of release, it reached 240 in France and 56 in Switzerland while the iTunes European Top 100 albums ranked Invisible Empire // Crescent Moon 50th. In Ireland, the album peaked at number 30.

The album was released on 6 August in the US, and peaked at 64 on the Billboard 200 and at 16 in both the Billboard Tastemaker albums and Rock Albums charts. The album peaked at 183 in the Japanese Album Charts but, like its predecessor, Tiger Suit, it failed to chart in the Australian and New Zealand top 50.

=== Critical reviews ===
Professional ratings
Aggregate scores
Source	Rating
Metacritic	74/100
Review scores
Source	Rating
AllMusic	4/5 stars
Daily Express	5/5 stars
Evening Standard	(8/10)
Rolling Stone	positive
Irish Times	3/5 stars
The Guardian	4/5 stars
The Independent	8/10 stars
The Scotsman	3/5 stars
So So Gay	4/5 stars
Uncut	8/10 stars
Virgin Media	4/5 stars
MIMO	5/5 stars

Invisible Empire // Crescent Moon received critical acclaim upon release. Giving the album 4 stars out of 5, Caroline Sullivan said "there's little here that doesn't make you wonder where Tunstall has been hiding all this beauty until now". The blog Female First also gave a very good review of the album, calling it "her most honest and talent-filled album yet".

Andy Gill, from The Independent, awarded the album four out of five stars, and highly advised listening to the tracks "Made of Glass", "Feel It All", "Yellow Flower" and "Honeydew". In that same article, he wrote "KT Tunstall's fourth album is by some distance her best". Virgin Media also awarded the album 4 stars, praising her voice by saying "Tunstall's voice is light, more pure than ever before" and describing "Crescent Moon" and "No Better Shoulder" as "wonderful". According to Theupcoming, who gave the album 3 stars out of 5, "Invisible Empire // Crescent Moon represents a turning point in her musical career: she’s grown up". In this review, Hannah Wallace said that "Waiting on the Heart" was " undoubtedly Invisible Empire // Crescent Moon’s killer track", but ended the article by saying, "It is questionable that such a strong Western motif was wise, but only time and play count can tell."

The Daily Express gave the album 5 out of 5 stars, and gave one of the most positive reviews of the album on its first week, saying, "Melodically perfect and lyrically heartfelt and with vocals that trip the eloquent songwriting fantastically, KT has on her hands a delicate masterpiece." With a similar enthusiasm, Ben Kelly from Sosogay gave 4 out of 5 stars, calling it "an emotional journey" and picking "Invisible Empire", "Old Man Song" and "Feel It All" as his favourites. The Sun gave 4.5 stars out of 5.

Only a few critics were less enthusiastic with Invisible Empire // Crescent Moon. For instance, Entertainmentwise criticised the "lack of fiery performances" that was Tiger Suit's best asset, but Sam Hailes, the review's writer, added, "At the end of the day Invisible Empire // Crescent Moon should be judged on its own terms. It's a deep, reflective and thoughtful album which stirs a plethora of emotions. Best served by itself with no distractions, this is an unhurried release that speaks to the heart." The worst rating is from the website "musicomh", which gave 2.5/5 stars, and said, "Tunstall's songwriting remains as pedestrian as ever, with most tracks lacking anything in the way of a memorable melody or any other kind of unique selling point." He also criticised the songs "Feel It All" and "Waiting on the Heart", describing them as "lifeless".

== Track listing ==
All tracks produced by Howe Gelb & KT Tunstall, except where noted. Additional production of "Feel It All – Band Jam" by Martin Terefe.

All tracks are written by KT Tunstall, except where noted.

No.	Title	Writer(s)	Length
1.	"Invisible Empire"		3:52
2.	"Made of Glass"		4:11
3.	"How You Kill Me"		4:11
4.	"Carried"		3:41
5.	"Old Man Song"		3:12
6.	"Yellow Flower"		3:12
7.	"Crescent Moon"		3:52
8.	"Waiting on the Heart"	Tunstall, Gelb	4:29
9.	"Feel It All"		4:11
10.	"Chimes" (featuring Howe Gelb)	Tunstall, Gelb	3:37
11.	"Honeydew"		3:22
12.	"No Better Shoulder"		5:27
13.	"Feel It All – Band Jam" (Radio edit)		3:49
Total length:			47:17

Deluxe edition bonus tracks
No.	Title	Writer(s)	Producer(s)	Length
14.	"Hallowed Ground" (Explicit) (featuring Howe Gelb)			4:59
15.	"Never Be the Same Again"			4:28
16.	"Crows"		Tunstall, The Suppliers	3:28
17.	"The Boys of Summer"	Don Henley, Mike Campbell	Tunstall, The Suppliers	3:57

iTunes deluxe edition bonus tracks
No.	Title	Length
14.	"Hallowed Ground" (Explicit) (featuring Howe Gelb)	4:59
15.	"Never Be the Same Again"	4:30
16.	"Tucson Time" (Making of – documentary film)	21:30

== Charts ==
Chart (2013)	Peak position
Belgian Albums (Ultratop Flanders)	51
Belgian Albums (Ultratop Wallonia)	72
Dutch Albums (Album Top 100)	84
Scottish Albums (Official Charts)	7
Swiss Albums (Schweizer Hitparade)	56
Irish Albums (IRMA)	30
Japanese Albums (Oricon)	183
UK Albums (Official Charts)	14
US Billboard 200	64
US Americana/Folk Albums (Billboard)	6
US Top Rock Albums (Billboard)	16
US Indie Store Album Sales (Billboard)	16

== Personnel ==
- KT Tunstall - vocals, guitar, vibraphone, piano, flute
- Howe Gelb - piano, keyboards, guitar, pedal, delay swell, vocals (10, 14).
- Luke Bullen - drums (1–4, 14–15), percussion (1–4, 14–15).
- Brian Lopez - guitar, backing vocals
- Gabriel Sullivan - guitar, vibraphone, accordion
- Thøger Tetens Lund - bass guitar, guitar, cello, bow
- Will Houchin - euphonium, tuba
- Jon Rauhouse - pedal steel guitar
- Marco Rosano - clarinet
- Andrew Bird - whistle, master stroke
- John Parish - steel drums, percussion, timpani, guitar, drums (9)
- Asger Christensen - violin
- Iris Marie Jakobsen - viola
- Erick Gardner - drums (8, 10–13), percussion (8, 10–13)
- Nicholas Coventry - strings
- Chris Black - string arrangement
- Chris Schultz - waterphone
- Martin Terefe - additional electric guitar (13)

== Release history ==
Region	Date	Label	Format
Australia	7 June 2013	Relentless	CD, digital download CD+DVD
Germany	7 June 2013	Relentless	CD, digital download CD+DVD
United Kingdom	10 June 2013	Relentless, under exclusive licence to Virgin	CD, digital download CD+DVD
Europe	10 June 2013	Relentless, under exclusive licence to Virgin	CD, digital download CD+DVD
Canada	11 June 2013	Virgin	CD, digital download CD+DVD
Japan	19 June 2013	EMI Records Japan	CD, digital download CD+DVD
Italy	25 June 2013	Virgin	CD, digital download CD+DVD
United States	6 August 2013	Virgin / Blue Note Records	CD, digital download CD+DVD
