= ITunes Live from SoHo =

iTunes Live from SoHo may refer to:

- iTunes Live from SoHo (Adele EP), 2009
- iTunes Live from SoHo (Audrey Assad album), 2011
- iTunes Live from SoHo (Civil Twilight EP), 2010 EP by Civil Twilight
- iTunes Live from SoHo (Counting Crows album), 2008 live album by Counting Crows
- iTunes Live from SoHo (The Fray EP), 2009 EP by The Fray
- iTunes Live from SoHo (Ladyhawke EP), 2010 EP by Ladyhawke
- iTunes Live from SoHo (Linkin Park EP), 2009 EP by Linkin Park
- iTunes Live from SoHo (Manchester Orchestra EP), 2010 EP by Manchester Orchestra
- iTunes Live from SoHo (Regina Spektor EP), 2009 EP by Regina Spektor
- iTunes Live from SoHo (Sara Bareilles EP), 2011 EP by Sara Bareilles
- iTunes Live from SoHo (Secondhand Serenade EP), 2009 EP by Secondhand Serenade
- iTunes Live from SoHo (Taylor Swift EP), 2008 EP by Taylor Swift
- Live from SoHo (The Good, the Bad & the Queen EP), 2007 EP by The Good, the Bad & the Queen
- Live from SoHo (Maroon 5 EP), 2008
- Live from SoHo (Melody Gardot EP), 2009
