= Winter's Tale (film) =

2014 film by Akiva Goldsman

- Theatrical release poster
- Directed by: Akiva Goldsman
- Written by: Akiva Goldsman
- Based on: Winter's Tale by Mark Helprin
- Produced by: Akiva Goldsman; Marc E. Platt; Michael Tadross; Tony Allard
- Starring: Colin Farrell; Jessica Brown Findlay; Jennifer Connelly; William Hurt; Eva Marie Saint; Russell Crowe; Will Smith
- Cinematography: Caleb Deschanel
- Edited by: Wayne Wahrman; Tim Squyres
- Music by: Hans Zimmer; Rupert Gregson-Williams
- Production companies: Village Roadshow Pictures; Weed Road Pictures; Marc Platt Productions
- Distributed by: Warner Bros. Pictures
- Release date: February 14, 2014 (United States)
- Running time: 118 minutes
- Country: United States
- Language: English
- Budget: $60-75 million
- Box office: $30.8 million

Winter's Tale (released in the United Kingdom and Ireland as A New York Winter's Tale) is a 2014 American romantic fantasy film based on the 1983 novel Winter's Tale by Mark Helprin. The film is written, produced and directed by Akiva Goldsman.

It stars Colin Farrell, Jessica Brown Findlay, Jennifer Connelly, William Hurt, Eva Marie Saint (in her final film role before her retirement and death in 2026), Russell Crowe and Will Smith. Winter's Tale premiered at London on February 14 and was theatrically released on February 14 in the United States by Warner Bros. Pictures.

The film received negative reviews and became a box office bomb, grossing $30.8 million against a budget of $60-75 million.

== Plot ==
In 1895, a young immigrant couple is refused entry into Manhattan because they have consumption (tuberculosis). When their infant son is not allowed entry into the country without them, the family is forced to return to their ship named City of Justice. The parents break the display case containing a model of the ship and place their baby inside it on the water, then watch him float to the New York City shoreline.

In 1916, the baby boy has grown up to become Peter Lake, a thief raised by a supernatural demon posing as the gangster Pearly Soames. Peter is marked for death when he decides to leave Pearly's gang. In a confrontation, he is rescued by a mysterious, winged at times white horse, his guardian angel.

Although Peter hopes to move to Florida and come back in the summer, the horse encourages him to steal from one last mansion. The mansion is the home where Beverly Penn lives, a young woman dying of consumption, whose fever is so high she sleeps outside in a tent in the winter cold. While her publisher father Isaac and younger sister Willa are not home, Beverly discovers Peter preparing to rob the house.

When Peter assures her that he no longer wishes to commit robbery, Beverly offers to make him a cup of tea. They tell each other their stories and fall in love. Pearly orders his men to Beverly's home, believing that saving her is Peter's "miracle" and spiritual destiny and that he can destroy Peter by preventing it. Peter rescues Beverly from being knifed by Pearly, and they escape to the Lake of the Coheeries, where Pearly, who is supernaturally limited to the five boroughs of New York City, cannot follow. Peter meets Beverly's family at their summer home and wins their respect.

While on a walk, Beverly explains to Peter that everyone is born with a miracle inside and they are ultimately destined to become stars when they die. Pearly asks Lucifer for access to the lake home, but his request is denied. Instead, Pearly, who refers to himself as a Knight among Lucifer's angels, calls in a debt owed to him by another of Lucifer's angels. At a ball, the angel disguised as a waiter poisons Beverly's drink.

When Peter and Beverly return home from the ball, Peter watches the shadows she casts upon the sides of her lighted tent, joins her, and the two make love. Her pulse races faster than ever due to the poison in her heart, and she dies. After the funeral, when Peter and his mysterious white horse return to the city, Pearly and his men surround them on the Brooklyn Bridge. To save its life, Peter orders his mysterious winged horse to fly away, and Pearly gives Peter five vicious head-butts, pushing him off the bridge.

Peter miraculously survives but wanders around the city with amnesia for a century, drawing chalk art of a red-headed girl on the pavements. In 2014, the 119-year-old, but physically undiminished Peter bumps into a young girl named Abby, and meets her mother, Virginia Gamely. He rediscovers the brass name plate of the "City of Justice", the model ship in which his parents placed him.

Peter then discovers the Theatre of the Coheeries, founded by Isaac, who has dedicated it to Beverly. He visits the Isaac Penn Reading Room where Virginia works, and she helps him restore his memory using historical photographs archived at the library. While there, he meets Beverly's now elderly sister Willa, the owner of Virginia's newspaper, who recognizes him.

When Peter visits the Gamelys for dinner, he learns that Abby has cancer. Realizing that Abby, who is wearing a red scarf (like his sketches) and has red hair, is his "miracle" and spiritual destiny, instead of Beverly as he originally believed, Peter convinces Virginia that he can save Abby. Pearly learns that Peter is still alive and with Virginia, and he is surprised to learn from Lucifer that Peter was Beverly's miracle, making him love her so much that he couldn't die.

Enraged, Pearly asks to fight Peter as a mortal so he can destroy him forever, and Lucifer grants his request while reminding him that if he loses then he himself will be destroyed forever. Pearly and his men arrive at Virginia's apartment, causing Peter and Virginia to flee to the rooftop with Abby. The mysterious winged horse flies them to the Lake of the Coheeries, but Pearly, now mortal, can pursue Peter beyond the Five Boroughs.

After the horse dispatches Pearly's men by crashing the ice so that they all drown, Peter and Pearly engage in a fistfight. Peter is losing until a light shines from the heavens and allows Peter to stab Pearly in the neck with the name plate from the boat. Pearly turns to snow and Peter is able to save Abby on the princess bed after he kisses her forehead. After visiting Beverly's grave one last time, Peter mounts the horse to be carried away to the stars, while the elderly Willa witnesses his ascension.

== Cast ==
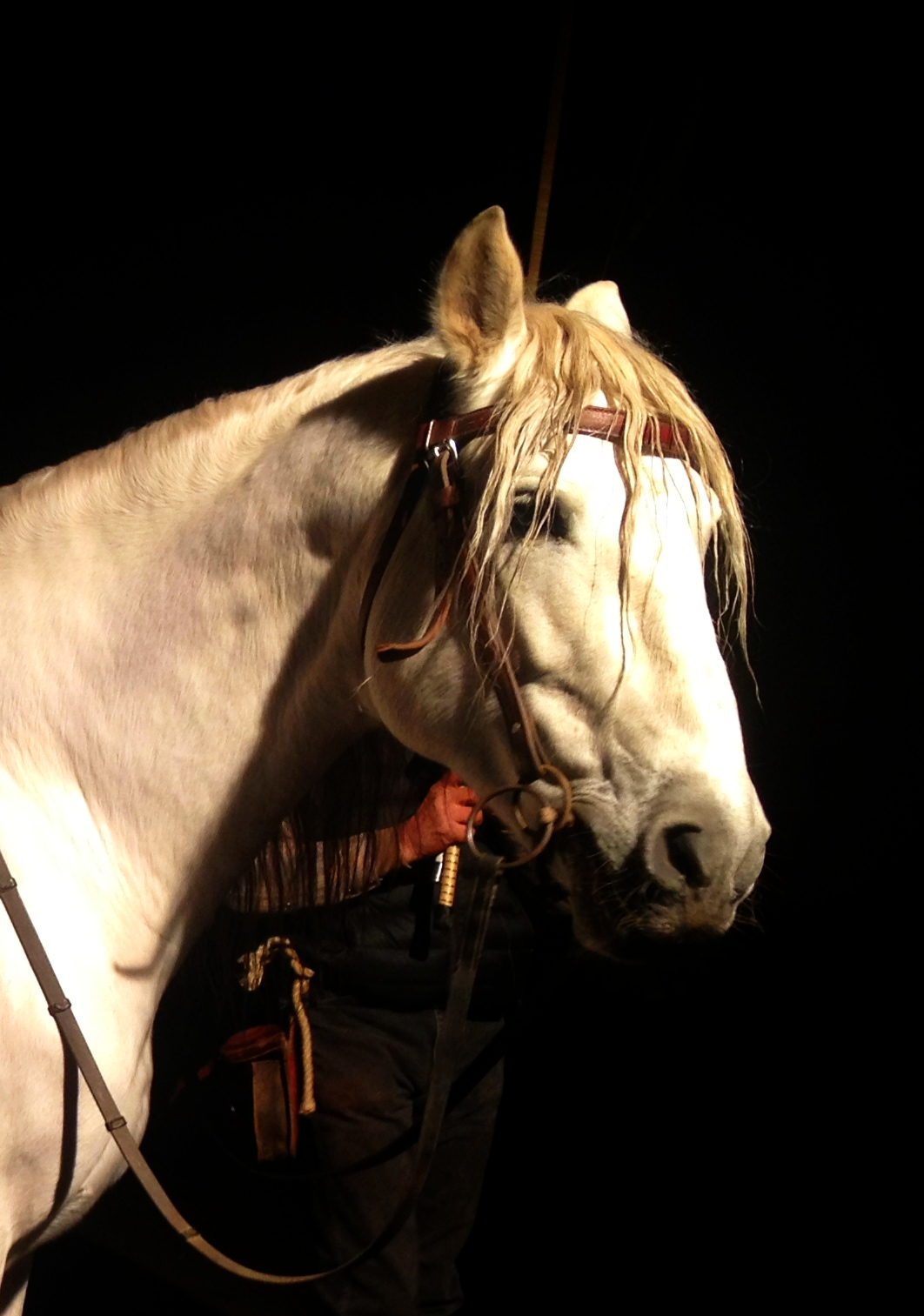
Listo, an Andalusian horse, plays "The Horse"

- Colin Farrell as Peter Lake
- Jessica Brown Findlay as Beverly Penn
- Russell Crowe as Pearly Soames / Demon
- Will Smith as Judge / Lucifer
- Eva Marie Saint as Willa Penn
  - McKayla Twiggs as young Willa Penn
- William Hurt as Isaac Penn
- Jennifer Connelly as Virginia Gamely
- Ripley Sobo as Abby Gamely
- Matt Bomer as Peter's father
- Lucy Griffiths as Peter's mother
- Finn Wittrock as Gabriel
- Kevin Corrigan as Romeo Tan
- Graham Greene as Humpstone John
- Kevin Durand as Cesar Tan

== Production ==
Initially, Warner Bros. attempted to sign Martin Scorsese in 2002, but he turned down the chance to direct the movie, calling it "unfilmable." Later on, Winter's Tale became a "passion project" for director Akiva Goldsman, who was given the go-ahead by Warner Bros. in February 2011 with a budget of $75 million. It was reported that the film's budget was dropped to $60 million in February 2012. At the same time Will Smith and Russell Crowe were linked to the project in supporting roles.

Benjamin Walker, Tom Hiddleston, Aaron Taylor-Johnson, and Garrett Hedlund auditioned for the role of Peter Lake while Elizabeth Olsen, Bella Heathcote, Gabriella Wilde and Sarah Gadon tested for the role of Beverly Penn. In March 2012 it was reported that Jessica Brown Findlay had been offered the role of Beverly. In April, Colin Farrell was linked to the role of Peter Lake. In August 2012, William Hurt joined the cast as Beverly's father, Isaac Penn. In September 2012 multiple new cast members were announced, including Matt Bomer, Lucy Griffiths and Eva Marie Saint. The final major addition to the cast was Jennifer Connelly, whose involvement was confirmed in October 2012 shortly before the start of filming.

Principal photography began in October 2012 but was delayed due to Hurricane Sandy. Shooting took place at locations across New York City including Grand Central Terminal, Red Hook, Brooklyn, East Village, Manhattan, and Central Park. Filming was also done at Lyndhurst in Tarrytown, New York. The cinematographer was Caleb Deschanel, who photographed the film with Arri Alexa digital cameras and Panavision C-, E- and G-Series anamorphic lenses.

== Release ==
Winter's Tale premiered in London on February 13, 2014, and was theatrically released on February 14, 2014, in the United States by Warner Bros. Pictures. The film opened poorly at No. 7, grossing $7.3 million in its first weekend. Winter's Tale grossed $12.6 million in the United States and $18.2 million abroad for a total of $30.8 million worldwide. Warner Home Video released it on DVD and Blu-ray on June 24, 2014.

== Critical response ==
On review aggregation website Rotten Tomatoes, the film has an approval rating of 12% based on 153 reviews and an average rating of 3.55/10. The site's critical consensus reads, "Winter's Tale tries to retain the grandiose sweep of its source novel, but fails to fill it in with characters worth rooting for or a sensible plot." On Metacritic, it has a score of 31 out of 100 based on 35 critics, indicating "generally unfavorable reviews". Audiences polled by CinemaScore gave the film an average grade of "B" on an A+ to F scale.

In a negative review for RogerEbert.com, Sheila O'Malley awarded the film one-and-a-half stars (out of four), stating: "It lacks visual splendor... It lacks emotional depth. It lacks scope and magic." O'Malley criticized Russell Crowe for "hoping that a facial tic will somehow translate as menacing", finding his first scene with Will Smith to be "incomprehensible", and praised Colin Farrell's "urgent, heartfelt performance". In his one-star review for The Guardian, Peter Bradshaw was more critical of Farrell, questioning why he gives Peter an Irish accent when "[h]is character has never been to Ireland." Bradshaw concluded his review by suggesting that the film could be made worse only by "releasing a giant, vicious, genetically engineered man-eating badger into the cinema while it's playing." Reviewing the film for Variety, Justin Chang claimed that writer-producer-director Akiva Goldsman was "out of his depth" but "fortunate in his choice of actors", finding Farrell to be "watchable", Jessica Brown-Findlay to be "luminous and intelligent", and Eva Marie-Saint's first film appearance since Superman Returns to be "welcome". Chang also praised the production design of Naomi Shohan, and the "moody, muted tones" of Caleb Deschanel's cinematography. Slackerwood's Jordan Gass-Pooré gave the film a negative review: "This movie may have people believe that there is a miracle inside everyone, which is on one hand uplifting, and on the other, really disappointing because, in the end, the moral of the movie is that people are all the same. And Winter's Tale is no different."

Kenneth Turan of the Los Angeles Times gave the movie a positive review: "Because it is fearlessly sincere and not totally successful, "Winter's Tale" is easy to mock. But it is also hard not to admire its willingness to go all out in its quest for the grandest of romantic gestures." Ben Sachs of the Chicago Reader said: "This live-action fairy tale aims to recapture the romantic splendor of MGM's golden era; the dialogue and metaphysical conceits are often risible, but even they convey an emotionalism rare in 21st-century Hollywood." Mick LaSalle of the San Francisco Chronicle gave the film a 3 out 4 rating.

A journal by author Neil Gaiman also defended the film, explaining why people should see it.

== Awards ==
The film's poster was nominated for a Golden Trailer award.

== Music ==
The musical score for Winter's Tale was composed by Hans Zimmer and Rupert Gregson-Williams, conducted by Nick Glennie-Smith and performed by the Hollywood Studio Symphony. A soundtrack album was released on February 11, 2014, by WaterTower Music. On February 4, 2014, four tracks were revealed on SoundCloud. "Miracle", by Scottish singer KT Tunstall became the lead single of the soundtrack. The three other tracks were "What's the Best Thing You've Ever Stolen?", "You Don't Quit Me, Boy", and "She Was Like a Bright Light" all composed by Hans Zimmer and Rupert Gregson-Williams.

=== Soundtrack ===
- "Masquerade Suite" – Written by Aram Khachaturyan
- "Miracle" – Written, produced, and performed by KT Tunstall
- All other music – Composed and written by Hans Zimmer and Rupert Gregson-Williams

== See also ==
- List of films about angels
- List of films about horses
