= Fade Like a Shadow =

Single by KT Tunstall

from the album Tiger Suit
- Released: 6 August 2010 (iTunes)
- Recorded: 2009–2010
- Genre: Pop rock; folk rock; folktronica
- Length: 3:28 (Album Version); 3:06 (Radio Edit)
- Label: Virgin
- Songwriter: KT Tunstall
- Producer: Jim Abbiss

KT Tunstall singles chronology
"If Only" (2007)	"Fade Like a Shadow" (2010)	"(Still a) Weirdo" (2010)

"Fade Like a Shadow" is a 2010 single released by Scottish singer–songwriter KT Tunstall. It was released only in the United States as the lead single for her third studio album Tiger Suit (2010). In August 2010, Tunstall performed an acoustic rendition of the track in 13 July at the Hiro Ballroom in Manhattan, using live looping to get the layering and harmonizing effects in the chorus. The song talks about accepting that a relationship has run its course, with the lovers parting ways.

== Background ==
The song is more upbeat and urgent than Tunstall's UK lead single, "(Still a) Weirdo". The singer's record company chose it for the American market as they felt the tune would play better at US radio. Tunstall told Billboard just after the song's release: "I may lose some fans of the old stuff, but I get the feeling I've already made a few new ones by embracing a bit of experimentation." The song talks about a person who haunted Tunstall for many months. She told Music Remedy, "The person is still very much alive, but my interactions with them led to these weird, almost visitation-like feelings that I found difficult to shake off." Tunstall expanded on the song to M Is For Music: "The song is about when I met someone who had a really negative effect on me, and even though they were still alive, I experienced these almost visitation-like hauntings that I couldn't shake off. I took to wearing a t-shirt with the person's name on to try and exorcise them, which finally worked."

== Reception ==
Sara Anderson from AOL Music said that "The song's title may sound melancholy, however, the track's chord progression is quite the opposite, backed by peppy, uplifting keyboard chords. James Berry from Yahoo! Music said, that:" There's the energy of electronic input underpinning some songs, but the moments that leave marks include the xylophone and acoustic guitar marching drum twinkle-fest "Fade Like a Shadow", which ticks over like it's chasing racing heart-beats. Jeff Tamarkin from The Boston Phoenix has said that: "The first single, "Fade like a Shadow", is emblematic of the denser, rowdier sonics that permeate much of the record. A dance-floor trifle that never lets up, it utilizes Tunstall's wall of guitars (and glockenspiel) not so much for melodic purposes as to fortify the muscle flexing of the rhythm makers on hand". Charlotte Richard Andrews from The Guardian said, positively, that: "The uptempo, chime-sprinkled "Fade Like a Shadow" – affirm Tunstall's skill at penning catchy yet credible pop hits".

== Music video ==
The music video was released on 20 August 2010. It was directed by Paul Minor. She compliments the hidden video cast orchestrating the flashlights and the fluorescent strobes for the video: "I loved making this vid with the rad, roller-skating ninjas, although I had serious whiplash the next day after all the headbanging."

== Chart performance ==
Weekly chart performance for "Fade Like a Shadow"
Chart (2010)	Peak position
Japan Hot 100	11
U.S. Billboard Adult Alternative Airplay	10
U.S. Billboard Digital Rock Songs	42
U.S. Billboard Adult Contemporary	40

Annual chart rankings for "Fade Like a Shadow"
Chart (2010)	Rank
Japan Adult Contemporary (Billboard)	35

== Release history ==
Region	Date	Format
United States	6 August 2010	Digital download
