= Tiger Suit =

Studio album by KT Tunstall
- Released: 22 September 2010
- Recorded: 2009–2010
- Studio: Hansa Tonstudio (Berlin); RAK Studios (London); Sarm Studios (London)
- Genre: Folktronica; indie pop
- Length: 43:04
- Label: Relentless
- Producer: Jim Abbiss (exec.); Greg Kurstin

KT Tunstall chronology
Have Yourself a Very KT Christmas (2007)	Tiger Suit (2010)	Live in London March 2011 (2011)

Singles from Tiger Suit
- 1. "Fade Like a Shadow" Released: 6 August 2010 (US); 2. "(Still a) Weirdo" Released: 26 September 2010 (UK); 3. "Glamour Puss" Released: 13 December 2010 (UK); 4. "Come On, Get In" Released: 25 December 2013

Tiger Suit (Untamed Edition)
- Cover for the 2021 'Untamed Edition' release of Tiger Suit

Tiger Suit is the third studio album by Scottish singer-songwriter KT Tunstall. It was released by Relentless Records in Ireland on 24 September 2010, in the United Kingdom on 27 September 2010 and in the United States and Canada on 5 October 2010. It was released in Europe on the 22 and 25 October 2010. It was supported by the release of two lead singles, "Fade Like a Shadow" in the United States, and "(Still a) Weirdo" in the United Kingdom. The Japanese edition, released on 22 September, features two additional tracks – a cover version of "New York, I Love You But You're Bringing Me Down" by LCD Soundsystem, and "It Doesn't Have to Be Like This (Baby)".

A commercial and critical success for Tunstall, the album peaked within the top five of the national singles charts in her native Scotland, as well as in the United Kingdom, and the top forty in several European territories including Ireland and Switzerland. In the United States, it peaked at number thirteen on the Top Rock Albums, and number forty-three on the main albums charts, the Billboard 200. It was awarded a Silver certification by the British Phonographic Industry (BPI).

== Background ==
On 11 February 2010 reported that, "KT Tunstall has recorded her new album in Berlin's famous Hansa studio. The studio, beside the site of the Berlin Wall, was used to make legendary albums including David Bowie's Heroes and U2's Achtung Baby. KT said: "I had an amazing three weeks recording in Hansa in Berlin in January and am finishing it all off in London." The Scots singer, who has been quiet of late, reassured fans she has been busy. She added: "I am still very much alive and have every music-making limb and muscle working in my laboratory of fierce-new-album-ness." Before her album comes out, KT played a stripped-down set at the Haiti fundraising gig at the Roundhouse in Camden on Thursday 25 February. She hoped to jump up with her old pal Seasick Steve for a song or two. Kt added: "My shizzle will feature some new faces and some new songs, so come and have a listen and chuck some dough at a good cause.""

She stated down the line from a promo stop in Minneapolis that she doesn't write on tour, "so it was essential that I took time out from her previous album Drastic Fantastic". She had started her time off by travelling through the Arctic, South America and India, so she had locked into a very primal, indigenous spirit by the time it came to recording.

Tunstall said that the album's title is inspired by a recurring dream she had, before discovering that 2010 is the Chinese Year of the Tiger. The dream is about her and her little brother, seeing a tiger in her garden and going outside to stroke it. She returns indoors and is seized by the fear that she could have been killed. Over the years, it has occurred to her that the reason the tiger responds so passively is that she is disguised as a tiger, wearing a tiger suit.

She said that while writing and recording the album, she found a new sound she called "Nature techno", which mixes organic instrumentation with electronic and dance textures. At a media showcase in London, Tunstall offered an unusual description of the songs from her forthcoming third album: "Like Eddie Cochran working with Leftfield".

== Release ==
=== Promotion ===
"Fade Like a Shadow" was the lead single in the United States and was released on 6 August 2010 via iTunes, while "(Still a) Weirdo" in the United Kingdom was released on 26 September 2010 via iTunes. In July 2010, as an advance to the album, Tunstall uploaded via YouTube a non-single video for the song "Push That Knot Away". On 13 December 2010, KT Tunstall made a collaborative video for "Glamour Puss" with fans. On 25 December 2013, over three years after the album's release, and even after the release of her fourth studio album Invisible Empire // Crescent Moon, Tunstall re-released a song from Tiger Suit as a last single; "Come On, Get In".

On 29 October 2021, a special expanded edition called Untamed Edition was released to mark National Album Day in the United Kingdom, released on vinyl and digital formats, consisting of a 2LP edition. The first one contains the album plus the bonus track "It Doesn't Have to be Like This (Baby)" and the second one consisting in demo versions of some tracks, Tunstall's early Hansa Studios sessions and the unreleased title track "Tiger Suit".

=== Critical reception ===
Professional ratings
Aggregate scores
Source	Rating
Metacritic	73/100
Review scores
Source	Rating
Allmusic	4.5/5 stars
BBC Music	(positive)
Entertainment Weekly	(B+)
Evening Standard	4/5 stars
The Guardian	4/5 stars
musicOMH	4/5 stars
The Phoenix	2.5/4 stars
Rolling Stone	3/5 stars
The Scotsman	4/5 stars
Yahoo! Music	(7/10)

Tiger Suit received generally positive reviews from critics. Aggregating website Metacritic reports a normalised rating of 73% based on fourteen critic reviews and AnyDecentMusic? reports a rating of 7.0 based on thirteen reviews. Stephen Thomas Erlewine of Allmusic gave it 4.5 out of five, saying it is "built upon Tunstall's strongest set of songs yet" and calling it "an excellent album that satisfies as pure sound and as songwriting sustenance". Charlotte Richardson Andrews of The Guardian called it an "inventive follow-up to 2007's Drastic Fantastic, which merges her raspy folk with free-spirited campfire rhythms" and found it "introspective in places, but mostly [...] fierce, claws-out fun".

Rick Pearson of the Evening Standard awarded Tiger Suit four out of five stars, saying that Tunstall "has set her sights on the dancefloor with its 11 up-tempo tracks" and that "the album adds synthesisers and drum machines to Tunstall's platinum-selling pop formula". Victoria Dillingham of musicOMH wrote that "despite her self-confessed lack of confidence when it comes to crossing musical boundaries, Tunstall proves that in the guise of her Tiger Suit she can achieve anything she puts her mind to." Greg Kot from Entertainment Weekly thought that "with commercial radio all about that urban groove thing these days, it's little wonder that the Scottish singer KT Tunstall decorates her Lilith Fair-style songwriting chops with electro-pop beats" and stated that she "keeps enough off-kilter grit in her voice to make the claim in "(Still a) Weirdo" stick".

Fiona Shepherd of The Scotsman felt that "Tunstall dresses up her songs with brave new sounds but at heart she's still a pop songwriter with rootsy inclinations" and stated that "there is a degree of tension throughout [the album] between Tunstall's determination to try something different and her love of a simple song". Matthew Horton of BBC Music said that Tunstall "has settled into a familiar groove" and called the album "all no end of fun, without pushing any envelopes". James Berry of Yahoo! Music noticed that "there's the energy of electronic input underpinning some songs, but the moments that leave marks include the four-to-the-floor squall of "Push That Knot Away" [...], staccato simplicity of "(Still a) Weirdo" and the xylophone and acoustic guitar marching drum twinkle-fest "Fade Like a Shadow"" and stated that the album sounds like "KT Tunstall armed with a better producer".

Jeff Tamarkin from The Phoenix found it "tougher, louder, and more electronically endowed than [...] its poppy predecessor" and noticed the "denser, rowdier sonics that permeate much of the record", but felt that "in her quest for catchy buzz lines, [Tunstall] sacrificed clarity and craft". J. Edward Keyes of Rolling Stone said that Tunstall "leavens sleek pop songs with her warm-whiskey rasp" and stated that "one of Tiger Suit's cleverest tricks" is that "it can so nimbly navigate such contradictions", awarding it three out of five stars.

=== Legacy ===
Two songs from the album – "Come On, Get In" and "Glamour Puss" – were used in the TV show Desperate Housewives' promotional advertisements for episodes 8 and 12 of the 7th season.

=== Commercial performance ===
In her native Scotland, Tiger Suit debuted at number two on the Scottish Albums Chart, remaining in the Scottish Top 100 Albums Charts for a combined total of nineteen weeks. In the United Kingdom, the album peaked on the UK Albums Chart at number 5, which is the third of Tunstall's albums to reach the top 5 (two of her previous albums peaked at 3). However, contrary to the two previous album, Tiger Suit stayed in the top 100 for four weeks (whereas Eye to the Telescope stayed for 94 weeks and Drastic Fantastic for 28 weeks). On its second week of release, the album fell down to 16th position, 33rd on its third week, and then disappeared from the top 40. In Ireland, the album peaked at 33, staying one week in the top 40.

In the United States, Tiger Suit peaked at the number of forty-three on the US Billboard 200 Albums, and also peaked at thirteen on the US Billboard Top Rock Albums, eighteen on the US Billboard Top Digital Albums, and twenty-five on the Top 100 European Albums Chart. In the other countries of Europe, the album failed to reach the Top 100 of the French Albums Charts, peaking at 118 and staying in the Top 200 of the French Albums Charts for two weeks. In Belgium, the Netherlands, and Germany, the album reached the Top 100 of their respective albums charts, reaching number ninety, sixty one and eighty-nine respectively. In Switzerland, the album peaked at 34 in its first week of release.

== Track listing ==
All tracks produced by Jim Abbiss, except track 2, "Glamour Puss", which is produced by Jim Abbiss and Greg Kurstin, track 9, "(Still a) Weirdo", produced by Kurstin, and track 13, "It Doesn't Have to Be Like This (Baby)", produced by KT Tunstall and Luke Bullen.

All lyrics are written by KT Tunstall, except for track 12, "New York, I Love You But You're Bringing Me Down", which is written by James Murphy, Pat Mahoney, and Tyler Pope.

No.	Title	Music	Length
1.	"Uummannaq Song"	KT Tunstall	3:37
2.	"Glamour Puss"	KT Tunstall, Greg Kurstin	3:19
3.	"Push That Knot Away"	KT Tunstall	3:46
4.	"Difficulty"	KT Tunstall	4:59
5.	"Fade Like a Shadow"	KT Tunstall	3:28
6.	"Lost"	KT Tunstall, Martin Terefe	4:41
7.	"Golden Frames" (featuring Seasick Steve)	KT Tunstall	3:46
8.	"Come On, Get In"	KT Tunstall, Martin Terefe	3:40
9.	"(Still a) Weirdo"	KT Tunstall, Greg Kurstin	3:40
10.	"Madame Trudeaux"	KT Tunstall, Linda Perry	3:18
11.	"The Entertainer"	KT Tunstall, Jimmy Hogarth	4:49
Total length:			43:04

Japanese special edition bonus tracks
No.	Title	Music	Length
12.	"New York, I Love You But You're Bringing Me Down" (Live from the Hiro Ballroom, New York)	James Murphy, Pat Mahoney, Tyler Pope	4:49
13.	"It Doesn't Have to Be Like This (Baby)"	KT Tunstall, Seye Adelekan	3:09
Total length:			51:02

iTunes Deluxe edition
No.	Title	Music	Length
12.	"New York, I Love You But You're Bringing Me Down" (Live from the Hiro Ballroom, New York)	James Murphy, Pat Mahoney, Tyler Pope	4:49

- "(Still a) Weirdo" (Music Video)
- "Fade Like a Shadow" (Music video)
- "How to Make a Tiger Suit" (Documentary)

Special DVD edition (available in UK, Germany, France, US)

- "How to Make a Tiger Suit"

Tiger Suit (Untamed Edition) 2021 - LP One
No.	Title	Music	Length
1.	"Uummannaq Song"	KT Tunstall	3:37
2.	"Glamour Puss"	KT Tunstall, Greg Kurstin	3:19
3.	"Push That Knot Away"	KT Tunstall	3:46
4.	"Difficulty"	KT Tunstall	4:59
5.	"Fade Like a Shadow"	KT Tunstall	3:28
6.	"Lost"	KT Tunstall, Martin Terefe	4:41
7.	"Golden Frames" (featuring Seasick Steve)	KT Tunstall	3:46
8.	"Come On, Get In"	KT Tunstall, Martin Terefe	3:40
9.	"(Still a) Weirdo"	KT Tunstall, Greg Kurstin	3:40
10.	"Madame Trudeaux"	KT Tunstall, Linda Perry	3:18
11.	"The Entertainer"	KT Tunstall, Jimmy Hogarth	4:49
12.	"It Doesn't Have To Be Like This (Baby)"	KT Tunstall, Seye Adelekan	3:10

Tiger Suit (Untamed Edition) 2021 - LP Two
No.	Title	Music	Length
1.	"Lost (Hansa Session)"		4:42
2.	"Come On, Get In (Hansa Session)"		3:57
3.	"(Still A) Weirdo (Hansa Session)"		2:58
4.	"Madame Trudeaux (Hansa Session)"		3:19
5.	"Scarlet Tulip (Hansa Session)"	KT Tunstall	4:23
6.	"Glamour Puss (Demo)"		3:17
7.	"Difficulty (Demo)"		4:35
8.	"The Entertainer (Demo)"		4:31
9.	"Come On, Get In (Demo)"		3:21
10.	"Tiger Suit (Bonus Track)"	KT Tunstall, Martin Terefe	3:40

== Personnel ==
- KT Tunstall – vocals, guitar, keyboards, whistle, bass, glockenspiel, stylophone, piano, beatbox, comb, flute
- Luke Bullen – drums, percussion, EBow
- Kenny Dickenson – keyboards, additional strings arrangement, piano
- Jamie Morrison – drums, percussion
- Seye Adelekan – bass, guitar
- Martin Robertson – duduk
- Charlotte Hatherley – backing vocals
- Jim Abbiss – Philicorda organ, vibraphone, keyboards
- IAMX – synthesizers, treatments, electronic drums
- Leo Abrahams – guitaret, bandura
- Russel Fawcus – violin, strings arrangement
- Gita Harcourt – violin
- Marianne Haynes – violin
- Paloma Deike – violin
- Sophie Solomon – violin
- Emma Owens – viola
- Amy May – viola
- Amy Iangley – cello
- Laura Anstey – cello
- Matt Radford – double bass
- Seasick Steve – vocals (7)
- Greg Kurstin – drums, keyboards, programming
- Nick Attwood – trombone
- Gary Alesbrook – trumpet, flugelhorn, baritone horn
- Robyn Hitchcock – slide guitar
- Arnuli Lindner – baritone guitar

== Charts ==
Chart (2010)	Peak position
Belgian Albums (Ultratop Flanders)	89
Dutch Albums (Album Top 100)	61
European Top 100 Albums (Billboard)	25
French Albums (SNEP)	118
German Albums (Offizielle Top 100)	89
Irish Albums (IRMA)	33
Japanese Albums (Oricon)	87
Scottish Albums (Official Charts)	2
Swiss Albums (Schweizer Hitparade)	34
UK Albums (Official Charts)	5
US Billboard 200	43
US Digital Albums (Billboard)	18
US Top Rock Albums (Billboard)	13

== Certifications ==
Region	Certification	Certified units/sales
United Kingdom (BPI)	Silver	60,000^{^}
^{^} Shipments figures based on certification alone.

== Release history ==
Region	Date	Label	Format
Japan	22 September 2010	EMI	CD
Ireland	24 September 2010	Relentless	CD; CD+DVD
United Kingdom	27 September 2010	Relentless	CD; CD+DVD
United Kingdom	29 October 2021	Relentless	Vinyl
Canada	5 October 2010	Virgin	CD; CD+DVD
United States	5 October 2010	Virgin	CD; CD+DVD
Europe	22 October 2010	Relentless	CD
Europe	25 October 2010	Relentless	CD+DVD
