= Hold On (KT Tunstall song) =

2007 single by KT Tunstall

Single by KT Tunstall

from the album Drastic Fantastic
- B-side: "Journey"
- Released: 16 July 2007
- Studio: Eastcote, Eden (London, England); Rockfield (Monmouthshire, Wales)
- Length: 2:57
- Label: Relentless; Virgin
- Songwriters: KT Tunstall; Ed Case
- Producer: Steve Osborne

KT Tunstall UK singles chronology
"Another Place to Fall" (2006)	"Hold On" (2007)	"Saving My Face" (2007)

KT Tunstall US singles chronology
"Other Side of the World" (2006)	"Hold On" (2007)	"Saving My Face" (2007)

"Hold On" is a song by Scottish singer KT Tunstall, written by Tunstall and produced by Steve Osborne for Tunstall's second album, Drastic Fantastic (2007). The song was released as the album's first single on 16 July 2007 in the United States. It was then released in the United Kingdom as a download single on 13 August 2007 and as a CD and 7-inch single on 27 August 2007. "Hold On" peaked at number 21 on the UK Singles Chart, number 19 in Norway, and number 26 in Italy and Switzerland. In North America, the song reached number 46 in Canada and number four on the US Billboard Bubbling Under Hot 100, topping the Billboard Triple A chart for 11 weeks.

== Critical reception ==
"Hold On" received mixed reviews from music critics. Billboard magazine's Susan Visakowitz called the song an "exhilarating three-minute ride" and "infectious and convincing". Internet publication Stereogum said that the song was "not bad" but questioned its commercial potential. Michael Slezak, in a review for Entertainment Weekly, was less impressed with the song, writing that "the melody lacks the immediate snap, crackle, pop of her previous hits". This song appeared at number 55 on Rolling Stone's list of the "100 Best Songs of 2007".

== Chart performance ==
In the United Kingdom, "Hold On" debuted at number 34 on 19 August 2007 on download sales only. Two weeks later, after the song was released physically, the song jumped eighteen places to a new peak of 21. In Canada, the song was released on 13 August 2007. Two weeks later, it debuted at number 46 on the Canadian Hot 100 and at number 20 on the Digital Singles chart. "Hold On" peaked on the United States' Billboard Bubbling Under Hot 100 Singles chart at number four, a position roughly equal to number 104 on the Hot 100. In its eight week on the Billboard Hot Adult Top 40 Tracks chart the song reached number 27. It also reached number one on the Triple A chart for 11 weeks.

== Music video ==
The music video premiered in July 2007 on MTV's Total Request Live. On BET's 106 & Park, it premiered in August 2007. On Yahoo! Music, it premiered on 30 July 2007. In it, Tunstall is transported back-and-forth between different worlds of dance after plugging in her guitar, which she throws away to join in on the action with other dancers.

== Track listings ==
UK CD single

1. "Hold On"
2. "Journey"

UK DVD single

1. "Hold On" (music video)
2. "Hold On" (behind the scenes video)
3. "Hopeless" (live acoustic + photo gallery)

UK 7-inch single

A. "Hold On"
B. "Suddenly I See" (live)

European maxi-CD single

1. "Hold On"
2. "Journey"
3. "Hold On" (video)

== Credits and personnel ==
Credits are lifted from the UK 7-inch single and Drastic Fantastic liner notes.

Studios

- Recorded at Eastcote Studios, Eden Studios (London, England), and Rockfield Studios (Monmouthshire, Wales)
- Mixed at Quad Studios (New York City)
- Mastered at Gateway Mastering (Portland, Maine)

Personnel

- KT Tunstall – writing, vocals, semi-acoustic guitar, cello intro
- Ed Case – writing
- Steve Osborne – keyboards, production
- Kenny Dickenson – keyboard arrangement
- Luke Bullen – drums, percussion
- Arnulf Linder – cello, double bass
- Richard Morris – engineering
- Anna Tjan – engineering assistance (Eastcote)
- Zoe Smith – engineering assistance (Eden)
- Simon Dawson – engineering assistance (Rockfield)
- Michael H. Brauer – mixing
- Will Hensley – Pro Tools engineering and mixing assistance
- Bob Ludwig – mastering

== Charts ==
Chart (2007)	Peak position
Belgium (Ultratip Bubbling Under Flanders)	9
Belgium (Ultratip Bubbling Under Wallonia)	12
Canada Hot 100 (Billboard)	46
Germany (GfK)	100
Hungary (Rádiós Top 40)	37
Italy (FIMI)	26
Netherlands (Dutch Top 40 Tipparade)	4
Netherlands (Single Top 100)	46
Norway (VG-lista)	19
Scotland Singles (OCC)	11
Slovakia Airplay (ČNS IFPI)	34
Switzerland (Schweizer Hitparade)	26
UK Singles (OCC)	21
US Bubbling Under Hot 100 (Billboard)	4
US Adult Alternative Airplay (Billboard)	1
US Adult Pop Airplay (Billboard)	27

== Release history ==
Region	Date	Format(s)	Label(s)	Ref.
United States	16 July 2007	Digital download	Relentless; Virgin	
United Kingdom	13 August 2007	Digital download	Relentless	
United Kingdom	27 August 2007	7-inch vinyl; CD; DVD	Relentless	
