= Saving My Face =

Single by KT Tunstall

from the album Drastic Fantastic
- B-side: "Mothgirl"; "Ain't Nobody"
- Released: 12 November 2007 (digital); 19 November 2007
- Genre: Alternative rock
- Length: 3:38
- Label: Relentless; Virgin
- Songwriter(s): KT Tunstall
- Producer(s): Steve Osborne

KT Tunstall singles chronology
| "Hold On" (2007) | "Saving My Face" (2007) | "If Only" (2008) |

"Saving My Face" is a song performed by Scottish singer KT Tunstall. The song was written by Tunstall and produced by Steve Osborne for the Tunstall's second album Drastic Fantastic (2007). The song's lyrics were inspired by a documentary Tunstall watched on the Discovery Channel "about old women having really disturbing amounts of plastic surgery to look very, very young."

== Music video ==
The music video was directed by Chris Bran of Black Dog Films and filmed over two days at east London's 3 Mills Studios. The video opens with a scene of Tunstall leaving a bar and walking through empty city streets, as broken pieces of her guitar fly by her. Occasionally while walking, her figure turns ghostly, and phases back in later scenes. The video concludes with Tunstall performing with her guitar after the pieces of it materialize in her hands.

Every frame of the music video required visual effects which were supervised by James Maclachlan of Prime Focus London. Post-production on the video lasted for fourteen days. The music video premiere on the internet in October 2007.

== Critical reception ==
"Saving My Face" received mixed reviews from music critics. Channel 4 called the song "a confident and old-fashioned pop rocker" and gave the song six stars out of ten. The Manchester Evening News was less impressed, giving it just two out of five stars, and wrote that the song was "nothing to get excited about" even though it had "some cute arpeggios and a very singable chorus." Digital Spy called "Saving My Face" a "dour affair", but praised its "delightful" lyrics and gave the song two stars out of five.

== Formats and track listings ==
These are the formats and track listings of major single releases of "Saving My Face".

UK CD single
(RELCD46; Released 19 November 2007)

1. "Saving My Face"
2. "Mothgirl"

7" vinyl single
(REL46; Released 19 November 2007)

1. "Saving My Face"
2. "Ain't Nobody"

Digital download
(Released 12 November 2007)

1. "Saving My Face"

Digital download
(Released 12 November 2007)

1. "Saving My Face"
2. "Mothgirl"

Digital download
(Released 19 November 2007)

1. "Saving My Face" (live acoustic version)
2. "Saving My Face"

Promo CD

1. "Saving My Face" (radio edit)
2. "Saving My Face" (instrumental)

== Charts ==
| Chart (2007) | Peak position |
|---|---|
| Belgian Singles Chart | 6 |
| Scottish Singles Charts | 19 |
| Italian Singles Chart | 23 |
| Swiss Singles Chart | 93 |
| Turkey Airplay Chart | 1 |
| Ukrainian Chart | 9 |
| UK Singles Chart | 50 |
| US Adult Alternative Songs (Billboard) | 4 |

=== Year-end charts ===
| Chart (2008) | Position |
|---|---|
| US Triple A (Billboard) | 24 |
