= The Kid (2010 film) =

- British theatrical release poster
- Directed by: Nick Moran
- Screenplay by: Mark Thomas; Kevin Lewis; Nick Moran
- Based on: The Kid; 2004 novel by Kevin Lewis
- Produced by: Judith Hunt
- Starring: Rupert Friend; Natascha McElhone; Ioan Gruffudd; David O'Hara
- Cinematography: Peter Wignall
- Edited by: Trevor Waite
- Music by: Ilan Eshkeri
- Production company: Tin House Films
- Distributed by: Revolver Entertainment
- Release dates: 22 April 2010 (Croydon Film Festival); 17 September 2010
- Running time: 111 minutes
- Country: United Kingdom
- Language: English

The Kid is a 2010 British biographical drama film directed by Nick Moran and co-written by Moran and Kevin Lewis. The film, based on Kevin Lewis' autobiography of the same name, details Lewis' adolescent and young adult life, having been raised in a violent, abusive family on a small council estate called New Addington in the 1980s.

Scottish singer/songwriter KT Tunstall wrote the song 'Boy' for the movie.

== Plot ==
Based on the real-life story of Kevin Lewis, the film follows his childhood of abuse, his descent into a life of crime and how he put his life together again afterwards. The screenplay was written by Mark Thomas and Kevin Lewis with additional writing by the film's director Nick Moran.

== Cast ==
- Rupert Friend as Kevin Lewis
  - Augustus Prew as teenage Kevin Lewis
- Ioan Gruffudd as Colin Smith
- Natascha McElhone as Gloria
- Con O'Neill as Dennis
- Bernard Hill as Uncle David
- Jodie Whittaker as Jackie
- David O'Hara as Terry
- James Fox as Alan
- Kate Ashfield as Madeline
- Ralph Brown as Gordon Peters
- Denise Gough as Patsy

== Production ==
=== Development ===
Director Nick Moran was linked to the project after being approached by development producer Mark Thomas who wrote the screenplay with Kevin Lewis. The two of them watched Moran's debut feature with executive producer Stephen May at Mayflower Studios. The film was called Telstar: The Joe Meek Story.

The decision was made to tone down the level of abuse in the film. "You get the feeling of what goes on and your mind will come to its own conclusions", said Lewis.

=== Casting ===
In order to learn how to box, Rupert Friend was sent to train with former WBO World middleweight and super middleweight champion Steve Collins.

Moran explained that the make-up team had to make Natascha McElhone less attractive for the role; "Yes we put a lot of make-up on her to ugly her up a bit for the role, but it's not 'Planet of the Apes' type make-up, she still had to act underneath all that stuff and she was amazing and really breathed life into the character." Due to the accuracy of the make-up, Kevin Lewis had difficulty being on set because she looked so much like the real-life Gloria; "It was such a shock and I walked off the set when I heard her as Gloria shouting."

Augustus Prew was not at first meant to be the teenage Kevin Lewis. They were going for the other actor because he looked more like Rupert Friend. To look more like Rupert Friend, Augustus Says that he got his photographer friend to take pictures of him, with the same suit, same pose and blue contacts in his eyes. He then became Kevin Lewis. To become more like Kevin Lewis, he lost over a stone of weight, wore shoes 4 sizes too small and wore clothes that were too small. He was also always hungry during shooting to become the character, because the real Kevin Lewis told him that he was always hungry and his muscles ached.

=== Filming ===
Various locations were scouted, including Lewis' home estate in New Addington, south of London, but it was ruled out due to the distance. The main locations were filmed on the South Oxhey council estate, on the borders of North London and Hertfordshire; however on the first day on set the filming was disrupted by the Criminal Investigation Department removing a dead body from the local woods.

== Music ==
British singer/songwriter KT Tunstall wrote a song called "Boy" for the film.

== Release ==
The film was affiliated on release with the British children's charity the National Society for the Prevention of Cruelty to Children, and the film's premiere was attended by the charity's ambassador Kylie Minogue.

Moran spoke of his hope that the film would result in a resurgence in this genre in the British film industry, "There's been a spate of rather silly British comedy films being made in the past few years and for a time that seemed to be the only type of film being made in this country so I hope 'The Kid' is a success and it opens the doors for more serious drama to be made in the UK."
