= (Still a) Weirdo =

Single by KT Tunstall

from the album Tiger Suit
- Released: 19 September 2010
- Recorded: 2009–2010
- Genre: Acoustic rock
- Length: 3:40 (Album Version); 3:20 (Radio Edit)
- Label: Virgin
- Songwriter(s): KT Tunstall; Greg Kurstin
- Producer(s): Greg Kurstin

KT Tunstall singles chronology
"Fade Like a Shadow" (2010)	"(Still a) Weirdo" (2010)	"Glamour Puss" (2010)

"(Still a) Weirdo" is a 2010 single by Scottish recording artist KT Tunstall. It was released as the UK lead single from her third studio album Tiger Suit (2010), on 19 September 2010. Written by Tunstall herself and Greg Kurstin, and produced by Kurstin, the song is an acoustic rock ballad and talks about still the same (weird) person after many years.

It received critical acclaim, with the majority of the critics complimenting Tunstall for the ability to make an intelligent, simple song. It charted inside the top-forty on the UK Singles Chart at number thirty-nine and as of 2023, remains her last UK top 40 hit. It charted also on the Belgian charts, as well as the singles charts in her native Scotland. In the music video, Tunstall travels back in time to the 1960s.

== Background ==
The song was described as a "heartfelt piece of self-assessment". Tunstall explained to MusicRemedy.com that the lyrics of this song are some of her most personal. "It's one of those rare moments where you can see yourself objectively and look into your own emotional machinery and realize what you are."

== Reception ==
Nick Levine from Digital Spy gave a positive review and rated the song with 4 stars out of 5. He says that "in the decidedly less jazzy hands of KT Tunstall, it becomes a sweetly self-deprecating and quietly optimistic little ditty about accepting your faults and making the best of it. 'I don't always get it right, but a thousand different ways and I just might,' she sings over an off-kilter and subtly inventive mix of piano, vocal loops and beatbox beats that has a wee hint of The X-Files theme to it. The overall effect is not unlike getting a bear hug and being told you're OK really by your best mate the morning after you disgraced yourself down the local in front of your ex - in short, just lovely." Matthew Horton from BBC Music said that: "More surprising is "(Still a) Weirdo", a quirky slice of Beatlesy clever-pop that recalls Elliott Smith". Greg Kot from Entertainment Weekly said,:"Tunstall keeps enough off-kilter grit in her voice to make the claim in "(Still a) Weirdo" stick". Victoria Dillingham from musicOMH gave an extremely positive review for the song, saying: "The pre-released single "(Still a) Weirdo" is a light playful track which prompts comparisons with the likes of Feist, Allie Moss and electronica/folk favourites Peter Bjorn And John. As infectious as it is original, this is easily the standout track of the album and exemplifies best the Brit Award winner's ability to marry disparate styles as well as her desire to experiment with her sound, aided and abetted by a revised band and Arctic Monkeys producer Jim Abbiss". Charlotte Andrews from The Guardian said: "The sweetly reflective first single "(Still a) Weirdo" – affirm Tunstall's skill at penning catchy yet credible pop hits".

== Promotion ==
Tunstall performed the song on This Morning, on 20 September 2010.

== Music video ==
The music video premiered on 17 August 2010, on Channel 4. It was directed by Paul Minor and was shot in Columbia, Tennessee, and shows Tunstall in the 1960s, walking around a town with her guitar.

== Chart performance ==
Chart (2010)	Peak position
Belgium (Ultratop 50 Flanders)	91
Belgium (Ultratop 50 Wallonia)	51
Scotland (OCC)	30
UK Singles (OCC)	39
