= Drastic Fantastic =

Studio album by KT Tunstall
- Released: 10 September 2007
- Recorded: 2006–2007
- Studios: Rockfield Studios (Wales); Eastcote Studios (London); Eden Studios (London)
- Genres: Alternative rock; pop rock
- Length: 39:50
- Label: Relentless
- Producer: Steve Osborne

KT Tunstall chronology
KT Tunstall's Acoustic Extravaganza (2006)	Drastic Fantastic (2007)	Have Yourself a Very KT Christmas (2007)

Singles from Drastic Fantastic
- 1. "Hold On" Released: 16 July 2007; 2. "Saving My Face" Released: 12 November 2007; 3. "If Only" Released: 3 March 2008; 4. "Little Favours" Released: January 2009 (Brazil only)

Drastic Fantastic is the second studio album by Scottish singer-songwriter KT Tunstall. It features some unreleased tracks she wrote before the release of her debut album, Eye to the Telescope, in 2004, including tracks she initially wrote in 2003 but did not make the final track listing for her debut album. The record was released by Relentless Records on 10 September 2007 in the United Kingdom and elsewhere in Europe, on 15 September in Australia, and 18 September 2007 in the United States and Canada. However, the album was leaked on P2P networks on 3 September 2007.

The album spawned three internationally released singles – "Hold On", "Saving My Face" and "If Only". The album track "Little Favours" was released in Brazil as a promotional single only. "Hold On" marked an international return to the singles charts for Tunstall, peaking at number one on the US Adult Alternative Airplay charts, number four on the US Bubbling Under Hot 100, the top twenty in her native Scotland and Norway, as well as the top thirty in the United Kingdom, Italy and Switzerland.

== Background ==
During the recording sessions for the album, Tunstall claimed it to be a "challenge", and began to accept the "rock star" image that was trying to be forced upon her "would never work". Tunstall recalled in an interview with Paul Sexton fifteen years after the albums release that she was "100% completely immersed in the difficulty of making my second album". She faced increased pressure from her record label to match the success of her debut album, Eye to the Telescope (2004) and struggled with the pressure. Mentally and physically exhausted, Tunstall did not have enough time to write new material for Drastic Fantastic in which she had experienced with Eye to the Telescope, as the whole process was completely new and did not have any pressure in the same way that recording and writing for her second album did. As a result, Tunstall used some "older" and unreleased material for inclusion on Drastic Fantastic as a result of feeling rushed and pressured for the album to be finalised and released.

Some similarities continued between the release of Eye to the Telescope and Drastic Fantastic, with Tunstall continuing with the same record label and public relations representatives. Despite this, in a later interview following the albums release, she said that she would have liked "stronger creative bridges between Drastic Fantastic and my debut", but cited greater similarities between the two albums than what people may notice. During the recording sessions and leading up to the albums release, relations between Tunstall and her record label had become "turbulent", and Tunstall struggled to connect with producer Steve Osborne. Some additional tracks features other unreleased songs such as "Mothgirl", "Bad Day" and "Journey", and during the Drastic Fantastic Tour, Tunstall covered "La Vie En Rose", which is on the U.K Bonus tracks, "My Sharona", The Bangles' "Walk Like an Egyptian" and Chaka Khan's "Ain't Nobody" which features on the DVD.

== Release ==
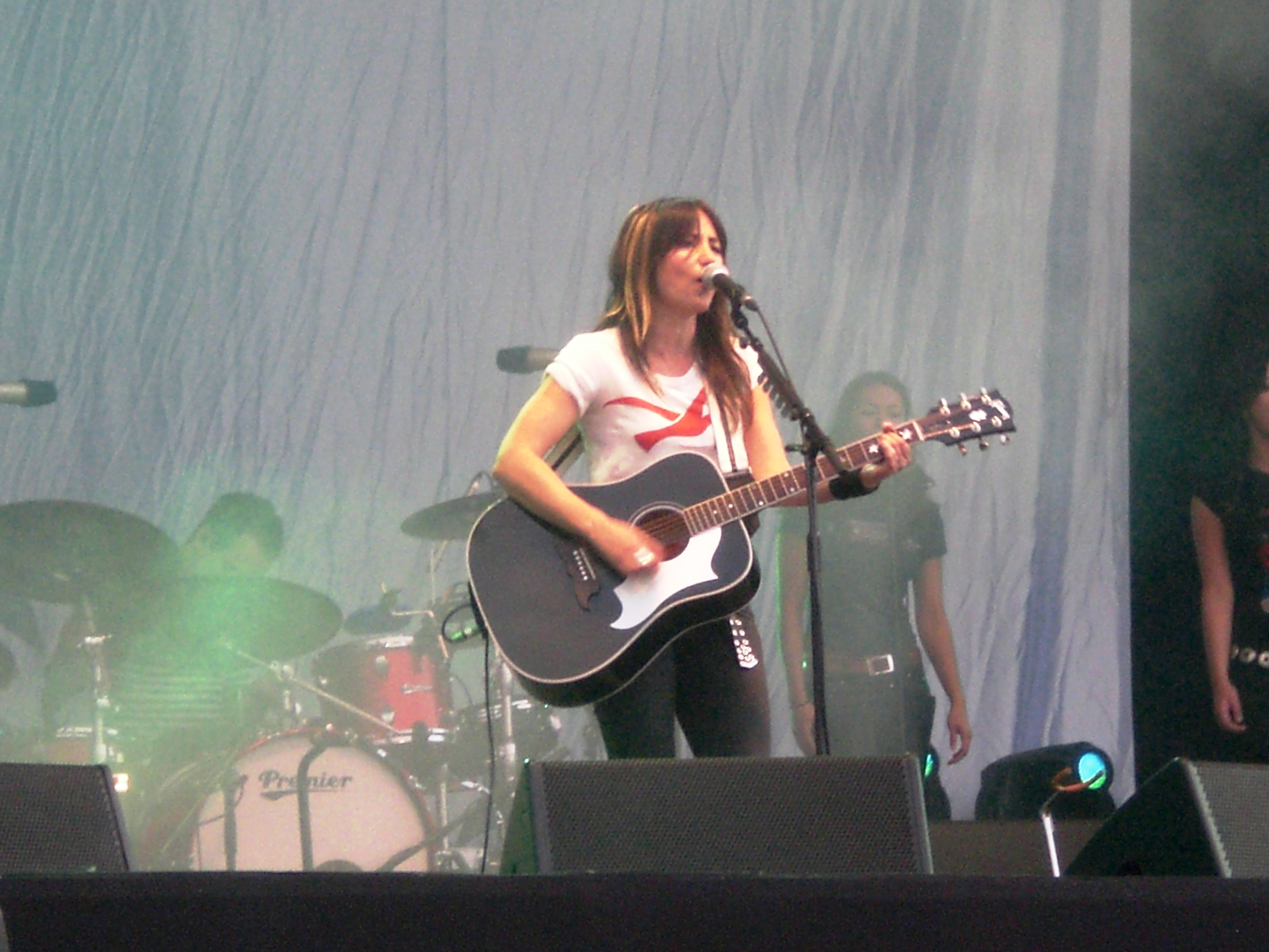
Tunstall promoting the albums release in 2008

Drastic Fantastic was released, firstly in Europe, on 10 September 2007, and had become the "highly anticipated" follow up to her debut album. In Australia, it was released on 15 September, and on 18 September in both the United States and Canada. The album was reissued on 15 January 2021 in vinyl, triple-disc, and digital formats as Drastic Fantastic: Ultimate Edition, consisting of previously unreleased songs and remixes. According to Tunstall, the album cover is based on Suzi Quatro. On the albums title, Tunstall said that she felt she got the title "dead right", crediting the time as being "incredible what was happening at that time, but it was also terrifying".

Three singles were released from the album to promote its release – the lead single, "Hold On", was released in July 2007 to critical acclaim and strong commercial performance, peaking at number one on the Adult Alternative Airplay in the United States, whilst it also reached the top ten in the Netherlands. It failed to chart within the Billboard Hot 100 in the United States, however, did debut at number four on the Bubbling Under Hot 100. In her native Scotland, it peaked at number eleven on the Scottish Singles Charts, whilst it reached nineteen in Norway and twenty-one in the United Kingdom.

Follow up single, "Saving My Face", was released in November 2007, achieving less commercial success than its predecessor. Despite this, it did peak within the top ten in Belgium, the top twenty in Scotland and the top thirty in Italy. The third and final single to be released from the album, "If Only", was released in March 2008 and performed better commercially in both the United Kingdom and Scotland than "Saving My Face" did, reaching number forty-five and fifteen respectively.

== Critical reception ==
Professional ratings
Aggregate scores
Source	Rating
Metacritic	68/100
Review scores
Source	Rating
AllMusic	4/5 stars
Robert Christgau	(dud)
Entertainment.ie	2.5/5 stars
The Guardian	3/5 stars
The Observer	5/5 stars
Rolling Stone	3.5/5 stars
The Times	3/5 stars
Uncut	4/5 stars

The album received warm, though conservative, praise by most critics. Music critics from The Observer gave Drastic Fantastic five stars, stating the album was "bursting with so many hits that Tunstall's comic-book life is about to go stratospheric". Rob Sheffield of Rolling Stone gave the album three-and-a-half stars out of five, and said that the album's sound was a "flashback" to 1997 by noting similarities between the songs on Drastic Fantastic and songs written 10 years earlier. Stephen Thomas Erlewine of Allmusic gave the album four out of five, calling Drastic Fantastic "a rare beast: a pop album with a songwriter's heart".

However, some critics were less impressed, stating that the album was overproduced and lacked the "folksy" touch of her previous album Eye to the Telescope. The Guardian gave it three stars, stating "Tunstall could do better".

== Commercial performance ==
It debuted atop to the albums charts in her native Scotland, remaining within the Top 100 Albums on the Scottish charts for a combined total of thirty weeks. It beat competition from the likes of Kanye West and 50 Cent to reach number one in Scotland. On the US Billboard 200 chart, Drastic Fantastic debuted at number nine, selling about 50,000 copies in its first week, and sold around 225,000 copies in 2007. Drastic Fantastic also debuted atop the US Billboard Alternative Albums and US Billboard Rock Albums.

In the United Kingdom, it debuted at number three on the UK Albums Chart, remaining within the Top 100 in the United Kingdom for a combined total of twenty six weeks. Elsewhere, it reached the top ten in both Canada and the Republic of Ireland, the top twenty in Argentina, the top thirty in the Netherlands, France New Zealand, and the top forty in Italy, Germany and Japan.

It sold over 290,000 copies in the United Kingdom, later being awarded a Gold certification from the British Phonographic Industry (BPI) in July 2013.

== Track listing ==
All tracks produced by Steve Osbourne.

All tracks are written by KT Tunstall except where noted.

No.	Title	Writer(s)	Length
1.	"Little Favours"		3:09
2.	"If Only"	KT Tunstall, Jimmy Hogarth	3:46
3.	"White Bird"		3:13
4.	"Funnyman"	KT Tunstall, Martin Terefe	2:56
5.	"Hold On"	KT Tunstall, Ed Case	2:57
6.	"Hopeless"		3:41
7.	"I Don't Want You Now"		3:48
8.	"Saving My Face"		3:38
9.	"Beauty of Uncertainty"		5:01
10.	"Someday Soon"	KT Tunstall, Jimmy Hogarth, Samuel Dixon	3:53
11.	"Paper Aeroplane"		3:16
Total length:			39:50

Digital bonus tracks
No.	Title	Writer(s)	Length
12.	"Journey"		4:39
13.	"La Vie en rose" (Edith Piaf cover)	Louis Guglielmi, Edith Piaf	2:29

UK iTunes bonus tracks
No.	Title	Length
12.	"Bad Day"	4:09
13.	"Suddenly I See" (Live)	6:03

Australian bonus track
No.	Title	Length
12.	"Suddenly I See"	3:21

Japanese bonus track
No.	Title	Length
12.	"Suddenly I See" (Live)	6:03

UK Amazon MP3 bonus tracks
No.	Title	Length
12.	"Mothgirl"	5:01
13.	"Bad Day"	4:09
14.	"Suddenly I See" (Live)	6:03

In addition with the Deluxe edition, a documentary DVD with the album.

Most songs on Drastic Fantastic are not new songs. An acoustic version of "Little Favours" and "Paper Aeroplane" appeared on the 2000 demo album Tracks in July. "Little Favours" also appeared as the B-side to "Under the Weather". "If Only", "Funnyman", and "Saving My Face" appeared on the demo album Toons March '03. Finally, Tunstall mentioned writing two new songs, "Hopeless" and "White Bird", in a blog entry from 2003.

The bonus track "Journey" appeared on KT Tunstall's early band Red Light Stylus' album Roughworks, under the title "The Journey's the Thing".

The original studio version "Suddenly I See", which appeared on Tunstall's first album Eye to the Telescope in 2004, was included as a bonus track on the Australian release due to the song's popularity in the country.

== Singles ==
- "Hold On" was released as the album's lead single on 16 July 2007 in the United States, and on 27 August in the United Kingdom.
- "Saving My Face" was chosen as the second single; it was released on 12 November 2007.
- "If Only" was released on 3 March 2008.
- A video for the song "Little Favours" was released in many music channels of Brazil (such as MTV Brasil & Multishow). The video is directed by Chris Bran, did not feature KT and only shows a KT Tunstall fan and ex-teacher Mr. Fritte with a puppet with strings, that he calls The Tunstallator.

The song is featured on the Brazilian soap opera Três Irmãs.

"Someday Soon" is available as a single on Internet music stores such as iTunes and Rhapsody. It was featured in the film The Women in a montage featuring Annette Bening and Meg Ryan.

== Personnel ==
- KT Tunstall – vocals, guitar, piano
- Luke Bullen – drums, percussion
- Sam Lewis – backing guitar
- Steve Osborne – bass, backing guitar, keyboards
- Arnulf Lindner – bass, double bass
- Kenny Dickenson – piano, keyboards
- Cat Sforza – backing vocals
- Gita Harcourt – backing vocals

== Charts ==
Chart (2007)	Peak position
Australian Albums (ARIA)	48
Austrian Albums (Ö3 Austria)	43
Belgian Albums (Ultratop Flanders)	49
Belgian Albums (Ultratop Wallonia)	82
Canadian Albums (Billboard)	10
Dutch Albums (Album Top 100)	21
French Albums (SNEP)	30
German Albums (Offizielle Top 100)	35
Irish Albums (IRMA)	10
Italian Albums (FIMI)	35
Japanese Albums (Oricon)	37
New Zealand Albums (RMNZ)	22
Norwegian Albums (VG-lista)	23
Scottish Albums (Official Charts)	1
Swiss Albums (Schweizer Hitparade)	8
UK Albums (Official Charts)	3
US Billboard 200	9
US Digital Albums (Billboard)	9
US Top Alternative Albums (Billboard)	1
US Top Rock Albums (Billboard)	1

== Certifications ==
Region	Certification	Certified units/sales
Ireland (IRMA)	Gold	7,500^{^}
United Kingdom (BPI)	Gold	291,322

== Release history ==
Region	Date
Europe	10 September 2007
Australia	15 September 2007
Canada	18 September 2007
United States	18 September 2007
