= List of awards and nominations received by KT Tunstall =

KT Tunstall awards and nominations
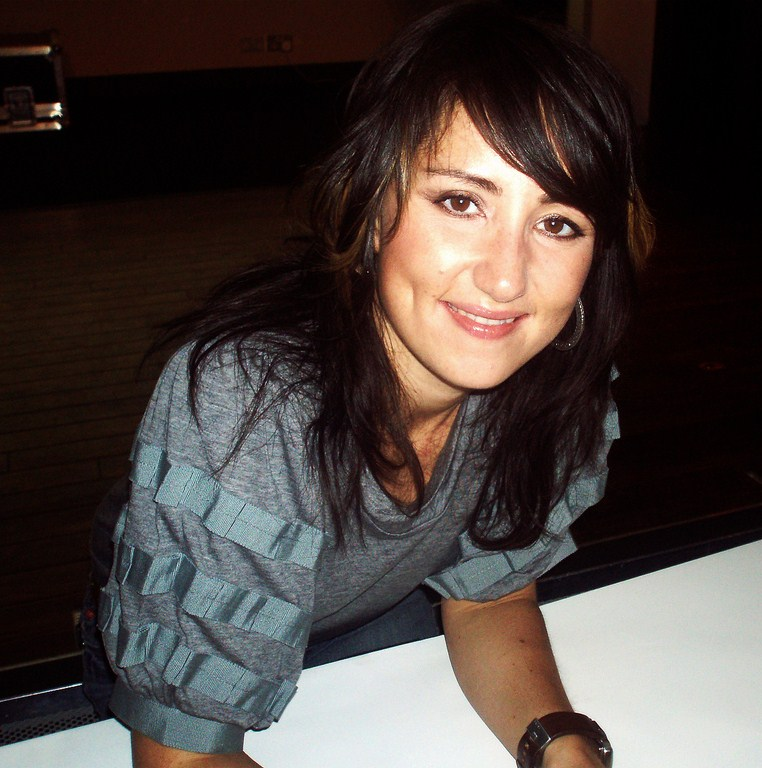
- Tunstall in 2007
Awards and nominations
Award	Wins	Nominations
Brit	1	4
Grammy	0	1
Ivor Novello	2	2
Mercury Prize	1	1

Totals (Note: Certain award groups do not simply award one winner. They acknowledge several different recipients, have runners-up, and have third place. Since this is a specific recognition and is different from losing an award, runner-up mentions are considered wins in this award tally. For simplification and to avoid errors, each award in this list has been presumed to have had a prior nomination.)
- Wins: 12
- Nominations: 20

This is a comprehensive listing of the awards and nominations received by Scottish singer KT Tunstall. In her breakthrough year, 2005, she received a nomination for the Mercury Music Prize, which eventually went to Antony and the Johnsons; and she won the Best Track of the year award from Q magazine for "Black Horse and the Cherry Tree".

In January 2006, she received three BRIT nominations—best British Live Act, best British Breakthrough Act, and best British Female Solo Artist—eventually gaining the award for best British Female Solo Artist, remarking that she wished to share it with fellow nominee Kate Bush. Later the same month she was given a European Border Breakers Award, which recognises the top-selling European Union artists outside their home country. Also in 2006, she won the Ivor Novello Best Song Musically and Lyrically for "Suddenly I See", along with Scottish Style Awards "Most Stylish Band or Musician".

She gained more nominations in 2007 and 2008: a 2007 Grammy Award nomination for Best Female Pop Vocal Performance for "Black Horse and the Cherry Tree" (the award went to Christina Aguilera for "Ain't No Other Man"), and another BRIT nomination for British Female Solo Artist, the award she had won in 2006.

== List of awards and nominations ==
Year	Organisation	Award	Nominated work	Result
2005	Q Awards	Best Track	"Black Horse and the Cherry Tree"	Won
2005	BBC Sound of 2005	Sound of 2005 (Sixth)	Herself	Nominated
2005	Mercury Music Prize	Album of the Year	Eye to the Telescope	Nominated
2006	European Border Breakers Awards	UK	Eye to the Telescope	Won
2006	Ivor Novello Awards	Best Song Musically and Lyrically	"Suddenly I See"	Won
2006	Scottish Style Awards	Most Stylish Band or Musician	Herself	Won
2006	Brit Awards	Best British Female Artist	Herself	Won
2006	Brit Awards	Best British Breakthrough	Herself	Nominated
2006	Brit Awards	Best British Live Act	Herself	Nominated
2006	World Music Awards	World's Best New Artist	Herself	Nominated
2006	World Music Awards	World's Best Pop/Rock Artist	Herself	Nominated
2007	Grammy Awards	Best Female Pop Vocal Performance	"Black Horse and the Cherry Tree"	Nominated
2007	BMI London Awards	Pop Award	"Black Horse and the Cherry Tree"	Won
2007	BMI London Awards	Pop Award	"Suddenly I See"	Won
2008	BMI London Awards	Pop Award	"Suddenly I See"	Won
2008	BMI London Awards	Pop Award	"Other Side of the World"	Won
2008	Brit Awards	Best British Female Artist	Herself	Nominated
2008	UK Music Video Awards	Best Telecine	"If Only"	Won
2016	Music Week Awards	Inspirational Artist of the Year	Herself	Won
2017	Hollywood Music in Media Awards	Original Song – Animated Film	"You Will Always Find Me in Your Heart"	Nominated
2024	Ivor Novello Award	Outstanding Song Collection with PRS for Music	Herself	Won
