= Brett Anderson Live in London =

Brett Anderson: Live in London

Live album by Brett Anderson
- Released: 9 May 2007
- Recorded: Shepherd's Bush Empire
- Genre: Alternative rock
- Length: 84:31
- Label: Concert Live
- Producer: Andrew Tulloch

Brett Anderson chronology
Brett Anderson (2007)	Brett Anderson: Live in London (2007)	Live at Union Chapel (2007)

Live in London is a live recording of Brett Anderson's 9 May 2007 concert at the Shepherd's Bush Empire. It comes on 2 CDs and was limited to 1500 copies. It was made available to concert-goers at the concert minutes after the conclusion of the set.

This is the first live recording to be released from Brett's first solo album and was recorded on the last night of the tour to promote the album. As well as solo material the concert concluded with acoustic and electric versions of Suede tracks.

Playing alongside Brett were current songwriting partner Fred Ball (keyboards) and former Suede member Mat Osman (bass).

No track-listing comes with the album.

The cover photograph is by Paul Khera.

== CD1 ==
1. "To the Winter" (6:00)
2. "Love Is Dead" (3:32)
3. "One Lazy Morning" (3:25)
4. "Dust and Rain" (3:09)
5. "Intimacy" (3:11)
6. "Back to You" (5:35)
7. "By the Sea" (4:23)
8. "Colour of the Night" (2:58)
9. "Scorpio Rising" (4:39)
10. "(Interlude/big pat on the back for fan (brett words of praise for "yuki"))" (0:44)
11. "Infinite Kiss" (5:34)
12. "Song for My Father" (6:55)

== CD2 ==
1. "Ebony" (5:01)
2. "The Big Time" (3:20)
3. "So Young" (3:07)
4. "The Wild Ones" (6:48)
5. "Can't Get Enough" (3:56)
6. "Trash" (4:46)
7. "Beautiful Ones" (7:28)
