= Can't Get Enough (Suede song) =

1999 single by Suede

Single by Suede

from the album Head Music
- Released: 8 November 1999
- Length: 3:58
- Label: Nude
- Songwriter(s): Brett Anderson, Neil Codling
- Producer(s): Steve Osborne, Suede

Suede singles chronology
"Everything Will Flow" (1999)	"Can't Get Enough" (1999)	"Positivity" (2002)

"Can't Get Enough" is the fourth and final single released from English rock band Suede's fourth studio album, Head Music (1999). The song was released on 8 November 1999 through Nude Records.

== Background ==
All of the songs on the album were produced by Suede with Michael Ade except "Can't Get Enough", which was produced by Steve Osborne. The song peaked at number 23 on the UK Singles Chart but was the first Suede single not to chart in Finland or Sweden since "New Generation" in 1995.

The UK video for the song was directed by John Hillcoat, and features a couple, played by Max Beesley and Laura Fraser, trashing their apartment. An additional Australian-only version of the video was produced and directed by drummer Simon Gilbert, and is a composite of on tour B-roll footage and a live performance.

The single was released in Sweden with "Let Go" as the lead track and containing the B-sides from the first two UK CDs.

== Critical reception ==
Music Week wrote: "[T]he Steve Osbourne-produced Can't Get Enough should see similar chart success to their previous two releases. While not as catchy, Can't Get Enough is a credible and energetic outing with some excellent guitar work and Brett Anderson's distinctive vocal." Select said "Suede's new-brand robo-pop reaches a mystifying conclusion here," and called the chorus' ambiguous lyrics "endearingly silly where once they were glorious." They added: "The B-sides show a welcome human touch beneath the metallic sheen, especially the lovely 'Since You Went Away'." Neil Davenport of the Manchester Evening News wrote: "Even when their concentration is waning – see their current album Head Music – they're still capable of sounding more alive and vital than a pile of indie ordinaire singles. But how difficult is that? Can't Get Enough is essentially a robotic march through I'm Not Your Stepping Stone as covered by the Sex Pistols. Compared to the recent metallic thunder, b-side Since You Went Away is delicate and rather lovely pastoral pop."

== Track listings ==
CD1

1. "Can't Get Enough" (Brett Anderson, Neil Codling)
2. "Let Go" (Anderson, Codling)
3. "Since You Went Away" (Anderson)

CD2

1. "Can't Get Enough" (Anderson, Codling)
2. "Situations" (Anderson, Codling)
3. "Read My Mind" (Anderson)

CD3

1. "Can't Get Enough" (Anderson, Codling)
2. "Everything Will Flow" [Rollo's vocal mix] (Anderson, Richard Oakes)
3. "She's in Fashion" [Lironi version] (Anderson, Codling)

Swedish CD

1. "Let Go" (Anderson, Codling)
2. "Can't Get Enough" (Brett Anderson, Neil Codling)
3. "Since You Went Away" (Anderson)
4. "Situations" (Anderson, Codling)
5. "Read My Mind" (Anderson)

== Charts ==
Chart (1999)	Peak position
Australia (ARIA)	137
Europe (Eurochart Hot 100)	80
Scotland (OCC)	31
UK Singles (OCC)	23
UK Indie (OCC)	5
