= Everything Will Flow =

1999 single by Suede

Single by Suede

from the album Head Music
- Released: 6 September 1999
- Length: 4:41
- Label: Nude
- Songwriters: Brett Anderson, Richard Oakes
- Producers: Steve Osborne, Suede

Suede singles chronology
"She's in Fashion" (1999)	"Everything Will Flow" (1999)	"Can't Get Enough" (1999)

"Everything Will Flow" is the third single from English rock band Suede's fourth studio album, Head Music (1999), released on 6 September 1999 through Nude Records. It was the first single of the band not to reach the top 20 since 1995's "New Generation". It was the second and final song by the group to chart in the US, peaking at number 28 on the Hot Dance Music/Club Play chart in 1999. Elsewhere, the song reached number 20 in Finland and number 55 in Sweden.

== Background ==
"Everything Will Flow" and "Leaving" were produced by Steve Osborne, "Weight of the World" was recorded by Miti Adhikari while "Crackhead" and "Seascape" were produced by Suede. The B-side "Weight of the World" on CD1 features keyboardist Neil Codling on lead vocals and the B-side "Seascape" on CD2 is an instrumental.

The video for the title song was directed by Howard Greenhalgh, and is another big budget video by the band. Though visually appealing with CGI water "flowing" throughout people, the band considers it a failure because they believe it resembles a bad television advertisement.

== Reception ==
Critics felt the song sounded similar to previous Suede songs. Leon McDermott of The List felt the song had a "nice chorus" but the song sounded like "nothing more than 'Stay Together' with more violins." Select felt it was a "slightly blander take on 'Saturday Night' with Brett's vocal mannerisms pushing him ever closer to Anthony Newley." Music Week called it "the shadier cousin of 'She's in Fashion', with a similar synthesized string refrain and distinctive lyrical Brett-isms."

Neil Davenport of the Manchester Evening News wrote: "Here Suede are in fine fettle as pomp-free balladeers. Like much of their recent Head Music album, though, overfamiliarity slightly dents current Suede. Eastern strings and studio sheen - vaguely redolent of Bjork - attempts a cosmetic tweaking, but it's Brett's Suedeworld themepark that's in need of a change. Still, as deserving your attention any great Suede single."

== Track listings ==
Cassette

1. "Everything Will Flow" (Brett Anderson, Richard Oakes)
2. "Beautiful Ones (live)" (Anderson, Oakes)

CD1

1. "Everything Will Flow" (Anderson, Oakes)
2. "Weight of the World" (Neil Codling)
3. "Leaving" (Anderson, Oakes)

CD2

1. "Everything Will Flow" (Anderson, Oakes)
2. "Crackhead" (Anderson, Codling, Simon Gilbert, Oakes, Mat Osman)
3. "Seascape" (Anderson)

== Charts ==
Chart (1999)	Peak position
Europe (Eurochart Hot 100)	72
Finland (Suomen virallinen lista)	20
Scottish Singles Sales (Official Charts)	31
Sweden (Sverigetopplistan)	55
UK Singles (Official Charts)	24
UK Indie (Official Charts)	2
US Dance Club Songs (Billboard)	28
