= Under the Weather (song) =

Single by KT Tunstall

from the album Eye to the Telescope
- B-side: "Little Favours"; "Tangled Up in Blue"
- Released: 5 December 2005
- Recorded: 2004
- Genre: Alternative rock
- Length: 3:36 (album version); 3:29 (single version)
- Label: Relentless
- Songwriters: KT Tunstall; TommyD
- Producer: Steve Osborne

KT Tunstall singles chronology
"Suddenly I See" (2005)	"Under the Weather" (2005)	"Another Place to Fall" (2006)

"Under the Weather" is an alternative rock song performed by Scottish singer-songwriter KT Tunstall. The song was written by Tunstall and TommyD and produced by Steve Osborne for Tunstall's debut album Eye to the Telescope (2004). It was released as the album's fourth single on 5 December 2005. The song reached No. 39 on the UK Singles Chart, remaining on the chart for two weeks.

== Formats and track listings ==
These are the formats and track listings of major single releases of "Under the Weather".

CD single

1. "Under The Weather" (Single Version)
2. "Tangled Up in Blue" (BBC Four Live Version)

Vinyl single

1. "Under the Weather" (single version)
2. "Little Favours"

Promo CD

1. "Under the Weather" (Radio Version) 3:14
2. "Under the Weather" (Instrumental) 3:28

== Chart performance ==
Chart (2005)	Peak position
Scotland (OCC)	28
United Kingdom (OCC)	39
United Kingdom Physical Singles (OCC)	36

== Release details ==
Region	Date	Format	Label	Catalogue	Ref(s).
United Kingdom	5 December 2005	CD	Relentless	RELCD23	
United Kingdom	5 December 2005	7-inch vinyl	Relentless	REL23	
