= Lump in My Throat =

Single by The Departure

from the album Dirty Words
- Released: 4 April 2005
- Recorded: 2004–2005
- Genre: Rock
- Length: 3:20
- Label: Parlophone
- Songwriter(s): David Jones, Sam Harvey, Ben Winton, Lee Irons, and Andy Hobson
- Producer(s): Steve Osborne

The Departure singles chronology
"Be My Enemy" (2004)	"Lump in My Throat" (2005)	"All Mapped Out" (2005)

"Lump in My Throat" is a song from The Departure's debut album, Dirty Words. It was released as the lead single from that album on 4 April 2005, and reached #30 in the UK Singles Chart.

== Track listing ==
- 7" R6659
1. "Lump in My Throat" – 3:20
2. "The City Blurs Your Eyes"
- CD CDR6659
1. "Lump in My Throat" – 3:20
2. "Under the Stairs"
- Maxi-CD CDRS6659
1. "Lump in My Throat" – 3:20
2. "Lump in My Throat" (James Ford remix)
3. "Be My Enemy" (Lamacq Live session)
4. "Lump in My Throat" (video)

== Charts ==
Chart (2005)	Peak position
UK Singles (OCC)	30
