= Love Is Dead =

Love Is Dead may refer to:

- Love Is Dead (Chvrches album), 2018
- Love Is Dead (Kerli album), 2008
- Love Is Dead (The Mr. T Experience album), 1996
- "Love Is Dead" (song), a 2007 song by Brett Anderson
- "Love Is Dead" Tokio Hotel song from the Scream album
- "Love Is Dead", a 2010 song by D'espairsRay from Monsters
- "Love Is Dead", a 2018 song by Turmion Kätilöt from Universal Satan
