= Amplifico =

- Origin: Kirkcaldy, Scotland
- Genres: Indie, pop, alternative rock
- Instrument(s): Guitar, drums, piano, vocals
- Years active: 2004–present
- Labels: MDM Creations
- Website: www.amplifico.net

Amplifico are a Scottish band comprising Donna Maciocia (keyboards and vocals), Ross Kilgour (guitar) and Dave Brunton (drums). The name Amplifico was chosen from a Latin dictionary (meaning to increase or enlarge).

== Origins ==
Amplifico's roots are from an early teens friendship at Balwearie High School, Kirkcaldy.

Donna Maciocia started song writing and performing in 2004 following her completion of an art degree at the University of Dundee. In addition to playing across the UK and Ireland with Amplifico, she provided backing vocals for KT Tunstall on her live Acoustic Extravaganza album, sang with Tunstall on her tour in 2006, appeared in Tunstall's "Another Place to Fall" video, and in 2007 joined Aberfeldy onstage as backing vocal and keyboard musician.

== Awards ==
Amplifico won the 'Best Scottish Band' title in a national UK competition for unsigned bands, playing Glasgow Carling Academy and London Astoria within a year of forming.

During this period, the band recorded and self-produced their first material (Hometakes 1 & Hometakes 2) and gained both live and internet based followings.

== Studio work ==
Unsigned and unmanaged, they utilised their fan base and internet following to fund their first full studio based work. This brought the group to the attention of the Scottish media with an article about their efforts to fund their first album being seen in 2006 on BBC Scotland main news programme, Reporting Scotland. The album was largely funded through individual donations and via a live web-streamed "webathon" fundraiser gig. Via their own ‘record label MDM Creations, Amplifico published See Heart, See Muscle on 3 March 2008. Immediately upon release, BBC Radio 1's Vic Galloway awarded Amplifico the 'Album of The Month' status on his show.
