= Electricity (Suede song) =

1999 single by Suede

Single by Suede

from the album Head Music
- Released: 12 April 1999
- Length: 4:39
- Label: Nude
- Songwriters: Brett Anderson; Neil Codling; Richard Oakes
- Producers: Steve Osborne; Ben Hillier; Bruce Lampcov

Suede singles chronology
"Filmstar" (1997)	"Electricity" (1999)	"She's in Fashion" (1999)

"Electricity" is the first single from the album Head Music by Suede, released on 12 April 1999 via Nude Records. It reached number five on the UK Singles Chart and in Finland and Norway. It was also a top-20 hit in Iceland, Ireland, Spain and Sweden and reached number 39 in New Zealand, becoming Suede's last charting single there.

== Background ==
The band re-emerged with "Electricity" after nearly two years away from the public eye. For the first time, synthesizers are used as a primary part of a song, working in parallel with the distorted guitar as opposed to just providing backing. The single helped guide the band's new direction, as evident in the fact that synths were also heavily used on Head Music. According to the song's co-writer Neil Codling, it is "hard-edged, spiky and more like the last album than anything else on this one." According to singer Brett Anderson, it is just a "simple love song." On the choice of the album's lead single, he said: "it was either going to be this or 'Savoir Faire'. There are about five singles on the album, so in the end I couldn't really tell which one should be first. It was pretty much flip a coin or roll some dice." However, there was in fact another contender for first single. Both "Electricity" and the title track "Head Music" were played to Sony A&R personnel around the world, who voted in favour of what they felt was the "safer" choice in "Electricity". The latter track ultimately was not chosen as a single from the album. "Electricity" was produced by Steve Osborne, "Popstar" and "See That Girl" were produced by Ben Hillier while "Waterloo" was produced by Bruce Lampcov.

== Release and promotion ==
The song was first performed live at a fanclub gig on 22 March 1999 at the Glasgow Garage; the band's first show since their Reading Festival appearance in 1997. Suede played at another fanclub show on 27 March at the London Astoria, with Black Box Recorder as the warm-up act. At the interval, the music video was premiered to a large gathering of the music media in attendance. To promote the single, the band performed the song on several TV shows, including: the Pepsi Chart Show, Top of the Pops, CD:UK. The single received exposure on Radio One's A-list four weeks in advance of release. On the day after its release on 12 April 1999, "Electricity" was holding up well at number two on the UK Singles Chart, behind Martine McCutcheon's "Perfect Moment". By the end of the week, it had slipped to its official peak of number five, and it went on to spend a total of seven weeks on the chart. British music charts commentator James Masterton felt that the decline from the midweek position was an indication that it is "only dedicated fans who are buying their records." "Electricity" would be Suede's last top-10 single in the United Kingdom. As part of a major marketing push for the 3 May album release, the single was chosen as the first ever MiniDisc single to be released in the UK, on 19 April 1999.

== Critical reception ==
"Electricity" received a generally favourable response from music critics, with some comparing the song to 1996 single "Trash". Music Week and the Irish Independent awarded the song, 'Single of the Week'. The former felt that it was "very different from the colder, more clinical material" on the album, calling it "a rock-charged stomper that compromises on nothing and promises everything for the album." The latter had high praise for the single. George Byrne wrote: "Just as 'Trash' served as a statement of intent back in 1996, so too 'Electricity' layers on slabs of driving guitars and bubbling synths, allowing Brett to take his warped vowel-yodel way beyond its Bowie-esque beginnings. A combination of Glam and Electronica, 'Electricity' offers further proof that Suede are the only real competition to the Manic Street Preachers for the title Best British Band of the Decade." Select wrote: "like 'Trash' before it, this squelchy-bassed return is utterly fresh without sounding remotely new." They added: "OK, so there are distinctly T. Rex-like backing vocals and nominal touches of studio trickery hinting at that much-touted New Direction, but essentially this is a tailor-made Uplifting Pop Single (imagine 'New Generation' morphed with 'The Beautiful Ones')."

Neil Davenport from Manchester Evening News wrote: "Easily dismissible as join the dots Suede, until that sky-scraping chorus registers like a bolt of adrenaline. There's a nod to T-Rex, but this is essentially Suede at their best – sleazy, wired and totally thrilling." Paul Connolly of The Times was favourable of the song and looked forward to the album, writing: "Its dense guitar structure is coated with a fierce metallic sheen but Brett Anderson's vocals are confident and expansive, and the song swells inexorably to a huge chorus, although the lyrics do stray into Celine Dion platitude territory: 'Our love is bigger than the universe/It's bigger than the two of us.' [...] Suede have rediscovered their heart. Head Music will be a blast." NME and The List were slightly more mixed, with both calling the song "Suede-by-numbers". Stevie Chick of the former was generally favourable by comparing it to earlier songs, saying: "a splash of 'Trash', a bar of 'Filmstar', er, quite a lot of 'She' actually but recycled cut-and-paste Suede is still a fair old mince ahead of most other singles you'll hear this year." While the latter's Brian Donaldson felt that "despite the somewhat filthy guitar intro [...] 'Electricity' finds Suede treading water when they should be breaking new ground." James Masterton said that the song "hardly ranks as the most appealing single they have ever released, lacking the killer chorus that made Trash and Metal Mickey such celebrated hits."

== Music video ==
The video shoot for "Electricity" took place on 10 March and was directed by Mike Lipscombe. One of the band's few big budget videos, it features the band performing in the back alley Falconberg Court behind the London Astoria venue, ghosting in and out of view as electrical power lines surge and shower sparks over scene. The director made use of miniature models, rotoscoping and heavy post-production to achieve the final, big production look. Alluding to the comparisons in Suede’s music to David Bowie, a New Zealand Herald writer noted the similarity of the video's setting to the cover of Bowie’s 1972 Ziggy Stardust album; which also features a W1 London cul-de-sac.

== Track listings ==
UK CD1

1. "Electricity" (Brett Anderson, Neil Codling, Richard Oakes)
2. "Popstar" (Anderson, Gilbert, Oakes, Osman)
3. "Killer" (Anderson, Oakes)

UK CD2

1. "Electricity" (Anderson, Codling, Oakes)
2. "See That Girl" (Anderson)
3. "Waterloo" (Codling)

UK cassette single and European CD single

1. "Electricity" (Anderson, Codling, Oakes)
2. "Implement Yeah!" (Anderson, Codling, Simon Gilbert, Oakes, Mat Osman)

European maxi-CD single

1. "Electricity" (Anderson, Codling, Oakes)
2. "Popstar" (Anderson, Gilbert, Oakes, Osman)
3. "Killer" (Anderson, Oakes)
4. "Implement Yeah!" (Anderson, Codling, Gilbert, Oakes, Osman)

UK MiniDisc single and Japanese CD single

1. "Electricity" (Anderson, Codling, Oakes)
2. "Popstar" (Anderson, Gilbert, Oakes, Osman)
3. "Killer" (Anderson, Oakes)
4. "See That Girl" (Anderson)
5. "Waterloo" (Codling)
6. "Implement Yeah!" (Anderson, Codling, Gilbert, Oakes, Osman)

== Charts ==
=== Weekly charts ===
Weekly chart performance for "Electricity"
Chart (1999)	Peak position
Australia (ARIA)	63
Europe (Eurochart Hot 100)	15
Finland (Suomen virallinen lista)	5
Germany (GfK)	92
Iceland (Íslenski Listinn Topp 40)	16
Ireland (IRMA)	18
New Zealand (Recorded Music NZ)	39
Norway (VG-lista)	5
Scottish Singles Sales (Official Charts)	6
Spain (Promusicae)	16
Sweden (Sverigetopplistan)	13
UK Singles (Official Charts)	5
UK Independent (Official Charts)	1

=== Year-end charts ===
Year-end chart performance for "Electricity"
Chart (1999)	Position
UK Singles (OCC)	196

== Release history ==
Release dates and formats for "Electricity"
Region	Date	Format(s)	Label(s)	Ref.
United Kingdom	12 April 1999	CD; cassette	Nude	
United Kingdom	19 April 1999	MiniDisc	Nude	
Japan	21 April 1999	CD	Nude	
