= He's Gone =

He's Gone may refer to:

- "He's Gone", a song by Grateful Dead on their 1972 live album Europe '72
- "He's Gone", a song by Suede on their 1999 album Head Music
