= Another Place to Fall =

2006 single by KT Tunstall

Single by KT Tunstall

from the album Eye to the Telescope
- B-side: "Fake Plastic Trees"; "Universe & U"
- Released: 13 March 2006
- Genre: Rock
- Length: 4:11 (album version); 3:45 (radio version)
- Label: Relentless
- Songwriter: KT Tunstall
- Producer: Steve Osborne

KT Tunstall singles chronology
"Under the Weather" (2005)	"Another Place to Fall" (2006)	"Hold On" (2007)

"Another Place to Fall" is a song by Scottish singer KT Tunstall. The song was written by Tunstall and produced by Steve Osborne for Tunstall's 2004 debut album, Eye to the Telescope. It was released as the album's fifth and final single on 13 March 2006. The song reached number 52 on the UK Singles Chart, remaining on the chart for two weeks.

== Formats and track listings ==
CD single

1. "Another Place to Fall" (Radio Version) – 3:45
2. "Fake Plastic Trees" (BBC Radio 1 Live Version) – 3:28

Vinyl single

1. "Another Place to Fall" (Radio Version) – 3:45
2. "Universe & U" (KT Tunstall's Acoustic Extravaganza Version) – 4:34

== Release history ==
Region	Date	Format(s)	Label(s)	Catalogue	Ref(s).
United Kingdom	13 March 2006	Relentless	CD	RELCD24	
United Kingdom	13 March 2006	Relentless	7-inch vinyl	REL24	
