= Szymon Piotrowski =

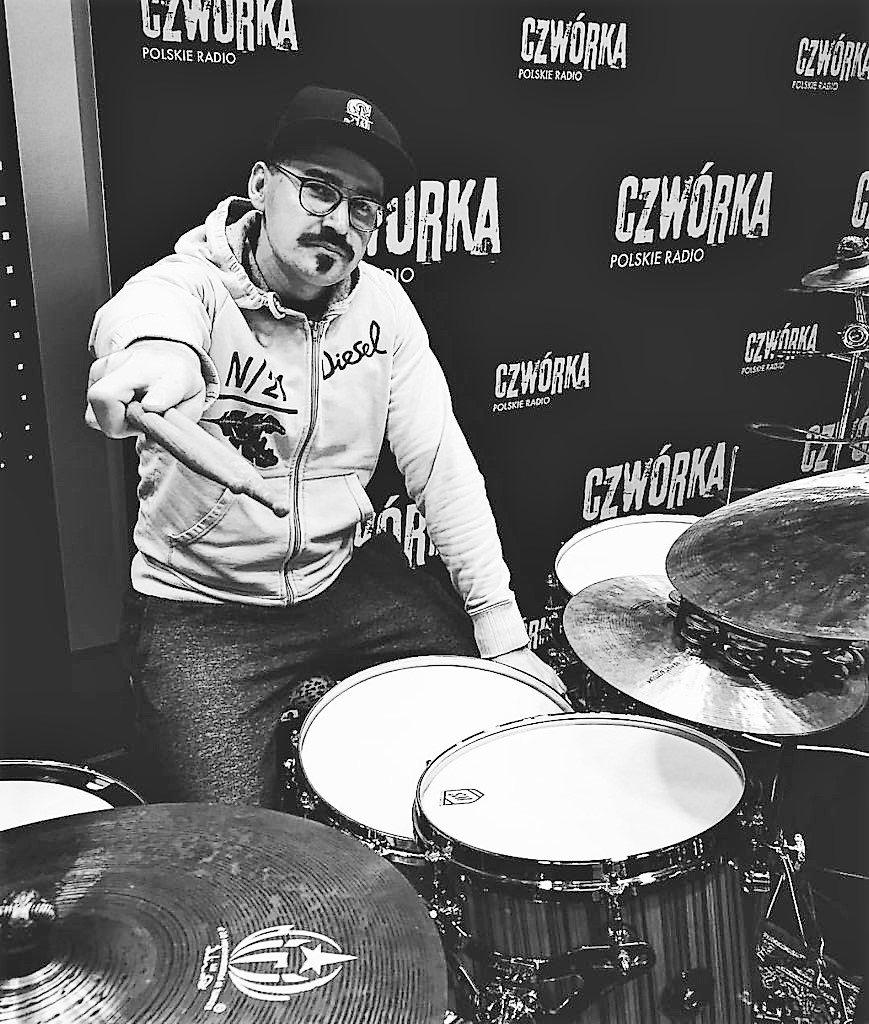
- Szymon Piotrowski in 2018
- Born: Szymon Aleksander Piotrowski; 12 May 1979 (age 47); Poland
- Occupations: music producer; sound engineer; musician; academic teacher
- Years active: 1994–present
- Spouse: Magdalena Plewa (after 2016)
- Musical career
- Instruments: drums; guitar
- Labels: Universal Music Polska; ONIONWAVE; Lynx Music
- Formerly of: Dom O Zielonych Progach; Firma Muzyczna; JJ5 Music Production; MLDVA; Norfolk; Per-Wers; Quadro Susanna; Seven Nation Army; SFORZA/Jasionowska; The Cold Blows; The Road; The Segue; Transfuzjon
- Website: www.tdotest.com

Szymon Piotrowski, known as 5zym, t dot est (born May 12, 1979) is a Polish music producer, sound engineer, musician and academic teacher. He is the author of numerous musical productions, recordings and mixes as well as the author of many scientific publications in the field of acoustics.

== Education ==
Graduate of the Faculty of Vibroacoustics and Sound Engineering at AGH University of Krakow and postgraduate studies in Music Recording and Production at University of Stavanger in Norway. Piotrowski has also studied at the Kraków School of Jazz and Contemporary Music.

== Career ==
In 2014, Szymon Piotrowski won the gold award in the "Traditional Studio Recording" category in the recording competition organized by the Audio Engineering Society. He composed his own music for Jeremy Collins' animation "The Wild Inside" and carried out sound postproduction for many video projects at the Canadian Banff Centre for Arts and Creativity. He has collaborated on the recording of dozens of albums as an instrumentalist, producer and sound engineer, including productions released by Universal Music Polska, ONIONWAVE, Addicted To Music, NORCD (NOR), Alpha Music (IT), RUNA Records (MEX), Moon Decay Records (USA), Jazzboy Records, FONOBO, Audiocave, Lynx Music. He has also produced sound for a large number of music videos and concert videos. From 2006 to 2022, he ran his own studio Psychosound in Kraków.

Piotrowski is a lecturer in the field of recording and music production at the AGH University of Krakow, Polish-Japanese Academy of Information Technology in Warsaw, as well as at the Krakow School of Jazz and Popular Music. Lecturer at the Film Music Festival Krakow and SOUNDEDIT Lodz festivals. In 2020 (Vienna) and 2024 (Madrid) judge in the recording competition organized at the Audio Engineering Society conferences.

Szymon Piotrowski is a co-founder of the Learn How To Sound Foundation (2016) and serves as the president of the foundation's board. He is a co-author of an educational book for children about sound "Hello! Here's sound!"

== Discography ==
Selected works (album/single title; year; artist – function):

- "Trzecie Oko" (2006); Sublokator – realization
- "Hold It As It Shines" (2007); CF98 / Maypole: "In Punk We Rust", "One Split" – guitar, mastering, mixer
- "Shit Fuck Kill" (2007); Terrordome – production, mastering,
- "Tiny Drum, Apple Juice, And Virgin Island on The Magic Store" (2008); CF98 – guitar, mixer, mastering
- "Nie salutuje" (2009); Sponta – mixer, remixer
- "Single 2010" (2010); Terrordome – realization, mixer, mastering
- "We'll Show You Mosh, Bitch!" (2011); Terrordome – production
- "Bestial Castigation" (2012); Terrordome /Dekapited – sound engineer, mixer
- "Fast And Loud" (2013); Traktor – realization, mixer, mastering
- "Suite" (2014); Cerebus – mixer, mastering, sound realization
- "Gjemsel" (2015); BenReddik – realization
- "Intoxicunts" (2016); Terrordome / Chaos Synopsis – mastering, mixer
- "0 Hours Starlight" (2017); Ketha – drums sound recording
- "Duchowy Gangster" (2018); Bosski* – mixer
- "Holograms" (2019); The Segue – drums, mixer, sound realization
- "Happines" (2020); Museart – sound recording, mixer, drums
- "Pętla" (2020); KIWI – vocal recording
- "Pytasz mnie" (2021); Dom o zielonych progach – sound recording, mixer, drums, guitar, moog
- "Stella Star" (2022); Stella Star – sound recording, mixer
- "All Thoughts Are Bad Thoughts" (2023); Ninja Episkopat – sound recording, mixer

== Scientific publications ==
Szymon Piotrowski is the author or co-author of numerous scientific publications:

- Robert Barański; Szymon Piotrowski (2005). "Zastosowanie filtrów falkowych do eliminacji przesłuchów przy rejestracji instrumentów perkusyjnych – Wavelet filters as the tool to eliminate the crossovers appearing during recording the drumset". ISSET 2005: reżyseria i inżynieria dźwięku i obrazu. Kraków: Audio Engineering Society. Sekcja Polska, Akademia Górniczo-Hutnicza w Krakowie. Katedra Mechaniki i Wibroakustyki. pp. 29–34.
- Szymon Piotrowski; Mariusz Szwedo (2006). "Drumheads expend and its influence for sound parameter". Archives of Acoustics. 31 (3). Instytut Podstawowych Problemów Techniki PAN; Komitet Akustyki PAN; Polskie Towarzystwo Akustyczne: 389. ISSN 0137-5075.
- Szymon Piotrowski; Mariusz Szwedo (2006). "Wpływ zużycia membrany instrumentów perkusyjnych na parametry dźwięku – Expend of drumheads and its influence for sound parameter". In Damijan, Zbigniew; Wiciak, Jerzy (eds.). OSA 2006: Materiały LIII Otwartego Seminarium z Akustyki. Kraków – Zakopane: Polskie Towarzystwo Akustyczne. Oddział w Krakowie. pp. 191–198.
- Szymon Piotrowski (2007). "Testy odsłuchowe specjalizowanej postprodukcji audio dla stratnej kompresji dźwięku – Listening test of specialize audio production for lossless audio compression". Materiały III Krakowskiej Konferencji Młodych Uczonych 20–22 września 2007. Kraków: Fundacja Studentów i Absolwentów AGH "Academica". pp. 147–151. ISBN 978-83-927762-0-8.
- Piotr Kleczkowski; Szymon Piotrowski; Marek Pluta (2007). "Assessment of the quality of digital audio reproduction devices by panels of listeners of different professional profiles". AES Convention Paper. 7234. Audio Engineering Society: 1–11.
- Szymon Piotrowski (2008). "Testy odsłuchowe na materiale audio o zróżnicowanym poziomie postprodukcji — [Listening test of audio material with different level of postproduction]". Materiały Krakowskiej Konferencji Młodych Uczonych 2008. Kraków: Fundacja Studentów i Absolwentów AGH "Academica". pp. 189–194. ISBN 978-83-921755-9-9.
- Robert Barański; Szymon Piotrowski (2009). "Idea of unified drumset records". Archives of Acoustics. 34 (3). Instytut Podstawowych Problemów Techniki PAN; Komitet Akustyki PAN; Polskie Towarzystwo Akustyczne: 355. ISSN 0137-5075.
- Robert Barański; Szymon Piotrowski (2009). "Koncepcja automatyzacji procesu ujednolicania nagrań perkusyjnych – Idea of unify drumset". OSA'2009: 56 Open Seminar on Acoustics. Goniądz nad Biebrzą: Instytut Podstawowych Problemów Techniki Polskiej Akademii Nauk. pp. 433–437. ISBN 978-83-89687-49-4.
- Szymon Piotrowski; Magdalena Plewa (2009). "Practical application of theoretical model to forecasting localization curves in percussion recordings". Archives of Acoustics. 34 (4). Instytut Podstawowych Problemów Techniki PAN; Komitet Akustyki PAN; Polskie Towarzystwo Akustyczne: 752–753. ISSN 0137-5075.
- Szymon Piotrowski; Magdalena Plewa (2009). "Zastosowanie modelu przewidywania lokalizacji w stereofonicznych technikach mikrofonowych przy nagraniach zestawu perkusyjnego – [Practical application of theoretical model to forecasting localization curves in percussion recordings]". In Miśkiewicz, Andrzej; Rogala, Tomira (eds.). ISSET 2009: XIII międzynarodowe sympozjum reżyserii i inżynierii dźwięku; XIII international symposium on Sound engineering and tonmeistering. Warszawa: Uniwersytet Muzyczny Fryderyka Chopina, Sekcja Polska Audio Engineering Society. pp. 124–129.
- Szymon Piotrowski; Magdalena Plewa (2012). "Subjective tests on audio mix dedicated to MP3 coding". Audio Engineering Society 132th convention. AES Convention paper (vol. 8651). Audio Engineering Society. pp. 1–6. ISBN 978-0-937803-86-8.
- Robert Barański; Szymon Piotrowski; Magdalena Plewa (2013). "Drum replacement using wavelet filtering". Audio Engineering Society 134th Convention. AES Convention Paper. 7234. Audio Engineering Society: 1–5.
