= Dirty Words =

Studio album by The Departure
- Released: 13 June 2005
- Recorded: 2004–2005
- Genre: Indie rock
- Length: 41:40
- Label: Parlophone
- Producer: Steve Osborne, The Departure, Tom Stubbs, Cenzo Townsend

Professional ratings
Review scores
Source	Rating
BBC	(Positive)
contactmusic.com	(Positive)
PopMatters	(8/10)
Stylus Magazine	(F)

Dirty Words is the debut album by British indie rock band the Departure, released in the United Kingdom on 13 June 2005.

== Track listing ==
All tracks written by David Jones, Sam Harvey, Ben Winton, Lee Irons, and Andy Hobson.

1. "Just Like TV" – 4:42
2. "Talkshow" – 3:06
3. "Only Human" – 3:30
4. "All Mapped Out" – 3:01
5. "Arms Around Me" – 4:21
6. "Lump in My Throat" – 3:20
7. "Don't Come Any Closer" – 3:28
8. "Changing Pilots" – 3:57
9. "Be My Enemy" – 3:24
10. "Time" – 4:25
11. "Dirty Words" – 3:26

=== Bonus tracks ===
12. "The City Blurs Your Eyes" (Japan only bonus track, released in the UK as the B-side to the "Lump in My Throat" single)
13. "This New Craze" (Japan only bonus track, released in the UK as the B-side to the "All Mapped Out" reissue single)

== Release details ==
The album has been released in various countries. At this time it is only available in North America via import.

Country	Date	Label	Format	Catalog
Japan	1 June 2005	Toshiba-EMI	CD	TOCP 66400
United Kingdom	13 June 2005	Parlophone	LP	7243 4 74953 1 1
United Kingdom	13 June 2005	Parlophone	CD	7243 4 74953 2 8
Australia	11 July 2005	Capitol Records	CD	330 5912
