= Brett Anderson (album) =

Studio album by Brett Anderson
- Released: 26 March 2007
- Recorded: winter 2005 – spring 2006
- Studios: The Pink Room, London; Kore Studios, Acton, London
- Genre: Alternative rock
- Length: 38:26
- Label: Drowned in Sound
- Producers: Brett Anderson, Fred Ball

Brett Anderson chronology
Brett Anderson (2007)	Live in London (2007)

Professional ratings
Aggregate scores
Source	Rating
Metacritic	51/100
Review scores
Source	Rating
AllMusic	4/5 stars
Evening Standard	3/5 stars
The Guardian	3/5 stars
The Irish Times	2/5 stars
MusicOMH	3/5 stars
NME	4/10
Pitchfork	2.9/10
The Press	4/5 stars
Q	1/5 stars
Uncut	4/5 stars

Brett Anderson is the first solo release from Suede and the Tears frontman Brett Anderson. It was released on 26 March 2007 by Drowned in Sound Recordings.

== Background ==
In May 2006, Anderson announced sketchy details for the album. He told NME that the title will be 'Brett Anderson' since "...that's my name, you see." The album was recorded whilst Anderson was recording The Tears' debut album alongside Bernard Butler.

Anderson has described the record as being "...quite orchestrated, lots of string loops, that sort of thing. I guess there's a Scott Walker feel to it. I'm very proud of it; it's a very exciting record for me."

The album sees Anderson taking on many more instruments than ever before. "I've played a lot of electric guitar on it; I've written a lot of the electric guitar parts. It's my baby and I've obviously been pretty obsessed with it."

The cover was designed by Peter Saville, with photography by Wolfgang Tillmans.

== Reception ==
The album received mixed reviews from critics. At Metacritic, which assigns a normalized rating out of 100 to reviews from mainstream critics, the album has an average score of 51 out of 100, which indicates "mixed or average reviews" based on 11 reviews.

== Commercial performance ==
The album was not a commercial success, charting at no. 54 on the UK Albums Chart.

== Track listing ==
Brett Anderson track listing
No.	Title	Writer(s)	Length
1.	"Love Is Dead"	Brett Anderson; Fred Ball	3:31
2.	"One Lazy Morning"	Anderson; Ball	3:20
3.	"Dust and Rain"	Anderson; Ball	3:01
4.	"Intimacy"	Anderson	2:48
5.	"To the Winter"	Anderson; Ball	3:57
6.	"Scorpio Rising"	Anderson	4:01
7.	"The Infinite Kiss"	Anderson; Ball	4:08
8.	"Colour of the Night"	Anderson; Ball	2:18
9.	"The More We Possess the Less We Own of Ourselves"	Anderson; Ball	3:33
10.	"Ebony"	Anderson	2:32
11.	"Song for My Father"	Anderson; Ball	5:17

== Personnel ==
- Brett Anderson - vocals, acoustic guitar, additional electric guitar, percussion, producer
- Fred Ball – keyboards, programming, producer, string arrangements
- Jim Dare – guitars
- Bastian Juel – bass
- Kristoffer Sonne – drums
- The Dirty Pretty Strings – strings
- Jim Hunt – flute on "Scorpio Rising"
- Kwame Ogoo - additional backing vocals on "One Lazy Morning"

Technical

- Bunt Stafford Clark – mastering
- Steve Fitzmaurice – mixing
- Dyre Gormsen – engineer
- Peter Saville – artwork
- Howard Wakefield – artwork

== Charts ==
Chart performance for Brett Anderson
Chart (2007)	Peak position
Scottish Albums (Official Charts)	64
UK Albums (Official Charts)	54
UK Independent Albums (Official Charts)	4
