= Head Music =

Studio album by Suede
- Released: 3 May 1999
- Recorded: 1998–1999
- Studios: Eastcote, Eden, Master Rock, Protocol, Sarm Hook End (London, England)
- Genres: Alternative rock; electronic rock; alternative dance
- Length: 57:47
- Label: Nude
- Producer: Steve Osborne

Suede chronology
Sci-Fi Lullabies (1997)	Head Music (1999)	A New Morning (2002)

Singles from Head Music
- 1. "Electricity" Released: 12 April 1999; 2. "She's in Fashion" Released: 21 June 1999; 3. "Everything Will Flow" Released: 6 September 1999; 4. "Can't Get Enough" Released: 8 November 1999

Head Music is the fourth album by English alternative rock band Suede, released by Nude Records in May 1999. Produced and mixed by Steve Osborne, Head Music features a more electronic sound, which was a new approach for the band. The recording of Head Music was plagued with difficulties such as singer Brett Anderson's addiction to crack cocaine, and keyboardist Neil Codling's struggle with chronic fatigue syndrome. The album still went to number 1 on the UK Albums Chart, however, making it the band's third and final chart-topping album. Overall, the album received generally favourable reviews from critics.

== Background and recording ==
After the release of the B-sides compilation Sci-Fi Lullabies, Suede decided to put themselves out of the limelight for over a year. Neil Codling spent most of the year in bed due to his illness and at the same time Anderson's drug abuse was becoming a cause for concern. Anderson began to associate himself with people outside the band's social circles, whom the band, especially Mat Osman, seemed to dislike. "More than anything there started to be a whole load of people he was associating with who I just couldn't stand. They had nothing to do with the band, nothing to do with anything but drugs. They were drug buddies."

Suede decided to move on from Ed Buller as their producer. After demoing 15 songs with three different producers, wanting to go in a more produced, electronic-sounding direction, the group chose Steve Osborne to produce the album. Osborne had previously worked with the band Happy Mondays. According to Anderson, Head Music was Suede's most experimental album, and Osborne's role played into the group's experimentation, "Steve was responsible for a hell of a lot of this album's sound. We chose him first of all because he did this fucking brilliant job on 'Savoir Faire'... It just sounded really exciting and unusual." Osborne's involvement sparked rumours of Suede going in a dancier direction, which the band denied. Osman insisted it is “groovier” than their previous songs with some using only one or two chords, while Anderson said: “The last thing we wanted to do was some obvious attempt to make a dance album, because it would have sounded like shit.”

Osborne was initially hired for one week of trial-run recording at Mayfair Studios, just to see how the process was going to work, or indeed if the two parties could work together. Suede's biographer David Barnett remembers the day when they did a test-run of "Savoir Faire" with Osborne at the trial sessions. He recalls being offered a crack pipe by two of Anderson's friends. "Naively assuming it to be a hash pipe, I took them up on the offer and was surprised to experience a sensation akin to inhaling several bottles of poppers at the same time. This was my first and last personal encounter with crack." Anderson was addicted to the drug for two and a half years, but stopped in late 1999 when somebody very close to him became ill. He has been clean since. Head Music was recorded between August 1998 and February 1999. Several studios were used including, Eastcote, Sarm Hook End, Master Rock and Eden Studios.

For guitarist Richard Oakes, the rehearsals for Head Music were unpleasant. Faced with Anderson's hedonistic lifestyle, Oakes began to drink more to make rehearsing more endurable. As he recalls: "I remember for quite a few of them, having to make sure that I was semi drunk just in order to turn up." Oakes also found his contributions being regularly knocked back in favour of Anderson and Codling's electronic experiments. Anderson felt that his spiralling drug use and Codling's illness made Oakes become more isolated from the group; and that the only people who were still getting on well were Osman and drummer Simon Gilbert. At one point relationships became so strained that Anderson demanded future member Alex Lee to be summoned to the studio presumably because no one else was willing to turn up.

The album is notable for being the first Suede album to have a title track. "Head Music" was one of Anderson's personal offerings, which Nude's Saul Galpern insisted should not go on the album. Osborne actually refused to record it, instead they got Arthur Baker to do a version, however they disliked it. Osborne eventually relented, but was not so flexible when it came Codling's next offering. "Elephant Man", which is the only song on a Suede album not written or co-written by Anderson. It was recorded, mixed and engineered by Bruce Lampcov. Codling contributed a greater amount of material to Head Music than Coming Up, receiving writing credits on six songs. Recording took six months but was extended by a break mid-way for more writing, finishing up more than two months over schedule. Danton Supple, who mixed the album with Osborne said: "Brett and I felt we were short of a couple of songs to complete the album. It would have been good to finish last year. We had the album but not the arrangements and we’ve just been mixing since."

== Musical style ==
"It's a fantastic album, but it could've been a lot better if we had left a couple things off of it. I still don't know why the hell we put "Crack in the Union Jack" and "Elephant Man" on there. It was meant to be an experimental record; we were trying to again push Suede in a slightly different direction. It was made with the right intentions, but it confused a lot of the fans."

— In hindsight, Brett Anderson divulging his regrets on the album.

More groove-oriented than previous Suede albums, Stephen Thomas Erlewine of AllMusic said that, due to Osborne's production, Head Music adds "some vague elements of electronic and dance music to Suede's signature sound, but these primarily manifest themselves in the form of gurgling analog synths and canned, old-school drum machines. Essentially, they're just window-dressing, since the songs themselves are extensions of the glam flash of Coming Up." The BBC felt the electronic influence was larger, describing an "emphasis placed on synths and all things electronica," although also noting that "the Suede identity is kept firmly in focus throughout." Spin thought likewise, saying the record "embraces the supposed contradiction of rocking out with a dance music mentor" and made note of its "complex sheen." Anderson has said the album was influenced by Asian Dub Foundation, Audioweb, Tricky, Prince and Lee "Scratch" Perry.

== Title and artwork ==
As a joke, the group originally started to leak the album's title to the press one letter at a time. But two days after releasing the second letter, bassist Mat Osman announced the album's title and explained where the idea of releasing the title one letter at a time come from: "Saul [Galpern], head of Nude was hassling for a title, and Brett said, 'I'll tell you one letter at a time until you can guess it." After the first two letters were revealed, there was speculation that the title was going to be called Heroin. The artwork, which features Anderson's girlfriend Sam, and Neil Codling, was art-directed by Peter Saville and designed by Howard Wakefield and Paul Hetherington. Anderson told Saville "I wanted two people joined at the head, sort of listening to each other's heads. He showed me some photos and we eventually got the cover we released."

== Release and promotion ==
The band began promoting the album around February 1999 with the announcement of six fanclub shows the band would be playing end of March. Three UK shows in Glasgow, Manchester, London; and three Scandinavia shows in Stockholm, Oslo, Copenhagen. The band took part in a live webcast of tracks from the final mixing session direct from their studio on 1 March. Fans were invited to take part in a web chat, view exclusive footage from the studio and listen to the new songs at Suede's official website. On 22 March, the band played their first live show since the 1997 Reading Festival at the first of six fanclub shows at The Garage in Glasgow. Making the most of the friendly fanclub show to focus solely on the forthcoming album, the fourteen track setlist consisted mostly of songs from Head Music and missed out old favourites, with the exception of some Coming Up era b-sides. Mat Osman said the band had about five songs to choose for the first single, including "Savoir Faire" and "She's in Fashion". Other contenders were the title track "Head Music" and "Electricity". According to Suede's biographer David Barnett, "Head Music" and "Electricity" were played to Sony A&R personnel around the world, who voted in favour of the "safer" choice in "Electricity" as the first single. Released 12 April, it earned the band their second-highest-charting single at number five in the UK. Continuing the run of five consecutive top-ten singles from Coming Up.

There was a lot of hype surrounding the release of Head Music, with numerous TV appearances including, CD:UK, The O-Zone, Top of the Pops, The Pepsi Chart Show and TFI Friday. Uncut featured Suede in an 18-page special in May 1999 chronicling the band's ten-year history, with the tagline: "Brett Anderson on a decade of decadence and debauchery." On 2 May, the day before the UK album release date, the band played a gig at Virgin's flagship Megastore on London's Oxford Street. The band played at 11pm and signed copies of the album for fans at midnight. For the week commencing 3 May, the entire chain of 92 UK Virgin Megastores were re-branded, changing its name to "Head Music". Virgin spent around £10,000 on the new store facias. Virgin also renamed its in-store radio station 'Head Music' for the week and erected special five-foot high Head Music listening posts. Commercially the album was a moderate success, being the band's third album to chart at no. 1 in the UK. However, it sold only 32,884 copies in the first week, just 499 more than ABBA's eight year old Gold: Greatest Hits. This was the lowest first week sale of any of Suede's three number one albums. Moreover, it slid quickly down the charts, exiting the Top 20 three weeks after release. In May 1999 the British Phonographic Industry certified the album as gold. The album was released in the US on Columbia Records 8 June. Head Music has sold about 26,000 copies in the US as of 2008 according to Nielsen SoundScan.

== Critical reception ==
Professional ratings
Review scores
Source	Rating
AllMusic	3/5 stars
Entertainment Weekly	C-
The Guardian	4/5 stars
Los Angeles Times	3/4 stars
NME	7/10
The Philadelphia Inquirer	3.5/4 stars
Pitchfork	7.4/10
Q	4/5 stars
Rolling Stone	3/5 stars
Spin	7/10

In the UK, the album received mostly favourable reviews with a minority of detractors. Ted Kessler of NME criticised Anderson's lyrical themes, saying: "he had nothing new to say." He did, on the other hand call it "hair-raising pop" and felt that the band were "striking out for new pastures." Andy Gill of The Independent, who harshly criticised Coming Up, gave the record a very positive review. He felt that the album was "broader in musical conception than their previous albums." He also felt that Osborne's influence was critical, saying he "naturally brings a more groove-oriented approach to the band's sound, which is slicker and smoother than before, and better reflects the band's 'chemical generation' outlook." The BBC were very favourable. Chris Charles felt that "all the pieces of the jigsaw are in the right place", and called it "the soundtrack for the future performed by artists in tune with one another."

Reviews in the US were mixed. Tom Lanham of Entertainment Weekly called it a "sad, strangely lackluster epitaph". He added, "even the strongest track on Head Music, 'Everything Will Flow', is a cheap echo of vibrant early work." Keith Phipps of The A.V. Club felt the album was their least consistent, saying: "The end result may be the least consistent album in a career marked by consistency, but it's still remarkable and well-represented by the grandiose pop of 'Electricity', 'She's in Fashion', and 'He's Gone', which do sound like proper Suede songs." The Phoenix felt that "Head Music isn't much more than an attention-grabbing, entertaining tease." However, positive praise came from Spin. Barry Walters wrote: "Suede and Steve Osborne achieve a hard precision that brings back the brutality of early Suede while lending a complex sheen to simplistic material." Also very favourable was A.D. Amorosi of The Philadelphia Inquirer, who also noted Osborne's role, saying: "Since 1990, Anderson & Co. have made the most of Bowie glam-era tartness without sounding even vaguely interested in flesh or flash. Head Music changes that, though, as producer Steve Osborne imparts a much-needed sense of sonic and emotional depth to make 'Electricity' and 'Savoir Faire' palpitate." Marc Weingarten of the Los Angeles Times called it "an album of considerable sweep and smarts", which would help the band "carve its own niche among American listeners."

Some critics saw Head Music as a major step forward from Coming Up and as a sign that the band's new line-up had been vindicated from doubters. Christina Rees of the Dallas Observer wrote: "If Suede couldn't erase the influence of Oakes' predecessor, Bernard Butler, on 1996's Coming Up, it has certainly succeeded now." She also added, "If the 'new' Suede didn't show up on Coming Up, it seethes through Head Music." Similarly an Australian Broadcasting Corporation article wrote: "Head Music fills in the gaps of Coming Up and succeeds in being the best record the band has made since its debut, finally laying Bernard Butler's looming ghost to rest." Fans and critics commented on Anderson's repetitive lyrics and lack of lyrical themes, in particular "Savoir Faire", which received attention and criticism. In 2002, Anderson admitted that he was addicted to crack cocaine for a period of time. Many critics linked the album's perceived lack of creativity to Anderson's increasing drug use. Nick Duerden of The Independent felt that Head Music was blighted by his descent into addiction, calling it a "rather ugly record". Writing for The Guardian, John Harris had similar views, saying "it was a fair bet, therefore, that the drug played its part in the creation of their most ludicrous album, 1999's Head Music."

=== Year-end lists ===
Publication	Country	Accolade	Year	Rank
Melody Maker	UK	Best Albums of 1999	1999	1
Pittsburgh Post-Gazette	US	The Best of 1999	1999	20
Q	UK	50 Best Albums of 1999	1999	*
Select	UK	Albums of the Year	1999	14

(*) designates unordered lists.

== Track listing ==
No.	Title	Writer(s)	Length
1.	"Electricity"	Brett Anderson; Neil Codling; Richard Oakes	4:39
2.	"Savoir Faire"	Anderson	4:37
3.	"Can't Get Enough"	Anderson; Codling	3:58
4.	"Everything Will Flow"	Anderson; Oakes	4:41
5.	"Down"	Anderson; Oakes	6:12
6.	"She's in Fashion"	Anderson; Codling	4:53
7.	"Asbestos"	Anderson; Codling	5:17
8.	"Head Music"	Anderson	3:23
9.	"Elephant Man"	Codling	3:06
10.	"Hi-Fi"	Anderson	5:09
11.	"Indian Strings"	Anderson	4:21
12.	"He's Gone"	Anderson; Codling	5:35
13.	"Crack in the Union Jack"	Anderson	1:56

=== 2011 remastered and expanded version ===
Disc One: Demos
No.	Title	Writer(s)	Length
14.	"Indian Strings" (Brett's original 8 track demo)	Anderson	4.04
15.	"Everything Will Flow" (Protocol demo)	Anderson; Oakes	7:10
16.	"He's Gone" (Protocol demo)	Anderson; Codling	5:17
17.	"She's in Fashion" (Protocol demo)	Anderson; Codling	5:19

Disc Two: The B-Sides
No.	Title	Writer(s)	Length
1.	"Leaving"	Anderson; Oakes	4:17
2.	"Popstar"	Anderson; Simon Gilbert; Mat Osman; Oakes	5:36
3.	"Killer"	Anderson; Oakes	4:58
4.	"Implement Yeah!"	Anderson; Codling; Oakes; Osman; Gilbert	2:34
5.	"Waterloo"	Codling	3:59
6.	"See That Girl"	Anderson	4:28
7.	"Bored"	Anderson; Oakes	3:02
8.	"Pieces of My Mind"	Anderson	4:35
9.	"Jubilee"	Anderson; Codling	3:47
10.	"God's Gift"	Anderson	2:55
11.	"Seascape"	Anderson	3:56
12.	"Crackhead"	Anderson; Osman; Gilbert; Oakes; Codling	5:53
13.	"Let Go"	Anderson; Codling	4:25
14.	"Since You Went Away"	Anderson	3:06
15.	"Situations"	Anderson; Codling	4:53
16.	"Read My Mind"	Anderson	4:41

Extra Tracks
No.	Title	Writer(s)	Length
17.	"Poor Little Rich Girl" (featuring Raissa)	Noël Coward	5:53
18.	"Heroin"	Anderson	2:55
19.	"Music Like Sex" (previously unreleased)	Anderson; Oakes	3:53

== Personnel ==
Suede

- Brett Anderson – vocals
- Richard Oakes – guitars
- Simon Gilbert – drums
- Mat Osman – electric bass
- Neil Codling – keyboards, synthesisers

Production

- Steve Osborne – production, mixing
- Ben Hillier – engineering
- Paul Corckett – engineering
- Danton Supple – mix engineering
- Bruce Lampcov – recording, mixing and engineering on "Elephant Man"
- Bunt Stafford Clarke – mastering

Artwork

- Nick Knight – cover
- Peter Saville – cover
- Brett Anderson – cover
- Howard Wakefield – design
- Paul Hetherington – design

== Charts ==
Chart performance for Head Music
Chart (1999)	Peak position
Australian Albums (ARIA)	26
Austrian Albums (Ö3 Austria)	19
Belgian Albums (Ultratop Flanders)	43
Dutch Albums (Album Top 100)	56
Finnish Albums (Suomen virallinen lista)	3
French Albums (SNEP)	39
German Albums (Offizielle Top 100)	26
New Zealand Albums (RMNZ)	33
Norwegian Albums (VG-lista)	1
Scottish Albums (Official Charts)	4
Swedish Albums (Sverigetopplistan)	1
UK Albums (Official Charts)	1

== Certifications ==
Certifications for Head Music
Region	Certification	Certified units/sales
Sweden (GLF)	Gold	40,000^{^}
United Kingdom (BPI)	Gold	100,000^{^}
^{^} Shipments figures based on certification alone.

== Bibliography ==
- Barnett, David (2003). Love and Poison. Carlton Publishing Group. ISBN 0-233-00094-1.
