= Back to You (Brett Anderson song) =

Single by Brett Anderson

from the album Wilderness
- Released: 9 July 2007
- Genre: Indie rock
- Label: Drowned in Sound
- Songwriters: Brett Anderson, Fred Ball

Brett Anderson singles chronology
"Love Is Dead" (2007)	"Back to You" (2007)	"A Different Place" (2008)

"Back to You" is the second solo single by Suede frontman Brett Anderson. It was released in July 2007.

The single was a collaboration with Norwegian electro pop producer Fred Ball (aka Pleasure). It was previously released on the second Pleasure album. The song was previewed by Anderson during his May 2007 concert tour. The version on Anderson's Wilderness album features vocals from French actress Emmanuelle Seigner.

The song became a favourite of Anderson's live shows and it was well-received. Cam Lindsay of Canadian music magazine Exclaim! wrote: "Heartfelt, gorgeous and affecting, it's a shame Brett can't do more of this because this is easily the best thing he's done since 'She's in Fashion' and a memorable moment in 2007." Music Week wrote: "Forever the emotional sound of the suburbs, Brett Anderson's solo work is hardly a million miles from his previous incarnations and this majestic effort sweeps along, pianos, strings and guitars reaching a crescendo reminiscent of many a Suede ballad."

The cover photograph is by Allan Jenkins.

== Track listing ==
1. "Back to You"
2. "Ebony" (Acoustic)
3. "Infinite Kiss" (Acoustic)
4. "Love Is Dead" (Acoustic)
5. "Song for My Father" (Acoustic)
