= Slow Attack =

Studio album by Brett Anderson
- Released: 2 November 2009
- Genre: Indie rock
- Length: 44:40
- Label: BA Songs
- Producers: Brett Anderson; Leo Abrahams

Brett Anderson chronology
Wilderness (2008)	Slow Attack (2009)	Black Rainbows (2011)

Professional ratings
Aggregate scores
Source	Rating
AnyDecentMusic?	5.7/10
Review scores
Source	Rating
AllMusic	3.5/5 stars
The Independent	3/5 stars
Mojo	4/5 stars
NME	7/10
Pitchfork	7.0/10
PopMatters	4/10 discs
The Sunday Times	3/5 stars
The Times	2/5 stars
Uncut	3/5 stars
Virgin Media	3/5 stars

Slow Attack is the third solo album by the English singer Brett Anderson, and released in 2009. This is Anderson's last solo album before Suede's reformation in 2010.

== Background ==
Produced by Anderson with new writing partner Leo Abrahams, it follows 2008's Wilderness. Anderson said: "It was conceived and created in the bleak London winter. It's when I feel most creative, as I often feel inspired to drown in music to escape the city's icy embrace." The album is described as being influenced by film soundtracks and the work of Talk Talk singer Mark Hollis, and features a great deal of woodwind instrumentation. Anderson said the record was "massively inspired by Spirit Of Eden and the sense of drama in it."

On his new release, Anderson said: "It's a new chapter for me. I finally feel like I'm starting to establish my own identity as a solo artist." Anderson has said that his new year tour will be devoid of any Suede songs. His live shows up until now have always included early songs and B-sides, however, Anderson feels it is time to move on. Speaking to The Herald he says: "This is my third solo album and I think it’s time to move away from that... I still love those songs, they mean a lot to me, but I need some space from them." Anderson wrote the album between January and May 2009, during which time he had written more than thirty songs. The sleeve was designed by Brett Anderson and photographer Paul Khera.

== Reception ==
The album was more warmly received than his previous album. However, it still garnered a mixed reaction from critics. Metacritic do not have an aggregate score for this album, though competitor site AnyDecentMusic? rated the album 5.7/10 based on nine reviews. Andy Gill of The Independent, who was a harsh critic of Wilderness said: "this is by far his best solo effort, the collaboration with producer/arranger Leo Abrahams prompting Anderson's most interesting output since his alliance with Bernard Butler."

Joshua Klein of Pitchfork rated the album 7.0 out of 10 and commented positively on Anderson's departure from Suede manifestations in his music. He wrote: "But if his first two solo albums came across self-conscious refutations of his roots, Anderson was at least brave enough to stick to his guns. Slow Attack doesn't always make sense in the context of Suede, but as far as solo Anderson goes, this album marks a logical next step in his transformation. Slow and steady, it's a promising sign of progress."

== Track listing ==
All songs written by Brett Anderson and Leo Abrahams, except where noted.

1. "Hymn" – 3:36
2. "Wheatfields" (Anderson) – 4:06
3. "The Hunted" – 4:01
4. "Frozen Roads" – 4:34
5. "Summer" – 3:24
6. "Pretty Widows" – 4:06
7. "The Swans" – 4:39
8. "Ashes of Us" – 4:41
9. "Scarecrows and Lilacs" – 4:29
10. "Julian's Eyes" – 3:46
11. "Leave Me Sleeping" (Anderson) – 3:18

=== iTunes Edition ===
12. "Forest Lullaby"

=== Japanese Edition ===
12. "With You, Within You"

=== Japanese Bonus CD ROM ===
1. "Frozen Roads"
2. "Ashes of Us"
3. "When Doves Cry" (Prince)
4. "Leave Me Sleeping"
5. "The Hunted" (Video)
