= Suddenly I See =

2005 single by KT Tunstall

Single by KT Tunstall

from the album Eye to the Telescope
- B-side: "Girl and the Ghost"; "Moment of Madness"; "Get Ur Freak On"
- Released: 29 August 2005
- Studio: Nam (Bath, England)
- Genre: Folk pop; blues; country; pop
- Length: 3:21
- Label: Relentless; Virgin
- Songwriter: KT Tunstall
- Producer: Steve Osborne

KT Tunstall UK singles chronology
"Other Side of the World" (2005)	"Suddenly I See" (2005)	"Under the Weather" (2005)

KT Tunstall US singles chronology
"Black Horse and the Cherry Tree" (2005)	"Suddenly I See" (2006)	"Other Side of the World" (2007)

Music video
- "Suddenly I See" on YouTube

Alternative covers
- Vinyl cover

"Suddenly I See" is a song by the Scottish singer-songwriter KT Tunstall from her debut studio album, Eye to the Telescope (2004). It was inspired by New York singer and poet Patti Smith, whose album cover for Horses (1975) also inspired Tunstall's album cover for Eye to the Telescope. The song was released on 29 August 2005 as the third single from the album in the United Kingdom. In the United States, it was released as the album's second single on 27 February 2006.

"Suddenly I See" peaked at number 12 on the UK Singles Chart to become Tunstall's highest-charting single in the UK. It also reached number 21 in the United States, number five in New Zealand, and is Tunstall's only top-50 hit in Australia, where it charted at number six on the ARIA Singles Chart. The song won Tunstall an Ivor Novello Award in 2006 in the category of Best Song Musically and Lyrically.

== Music and lyrics ==
The song itself is a tribute to "female power", inspired by and about American singer and songwriter Patti Smith. As described in the lyrics, KT Tunstall was inspired to a career in music through looking at a black and white picture of a woman. Admiring her strength and accomplishments, she suddenly realised what she wanted to do with her life. Tunstall stated in an interview that the song was "about Robert Mapplethorpe's photograph of Patti Smith on the cover of Horses". Commenting on the song's later use in The Devil Wears Prada (2006), Tunstall said: "I didn't realize the lyrics could perfectly fit a chick flick, and it could sound like I was singing about wanting to be a fucking model!"

The music has been described as featuring a "chugging rhythm" with a "guitar-bass focused beat", as "compelling", and with "urgency", and having a "shiny production". Although the real focus might be on her "clear vocals", "it's in the growls...that Tunstall truly commands attention". Stylistically, it has been described as a "blues-country-pop hybrid".

== Release ==
"Suddenly I See" was released as the third single from KT Tunstall's debut studio album, Eye to the Telescope, on 29 August 2005 in the United Kingdom. The release followed the success of "Black Horse and the Cherry Tree" and "Other Side of the World" and was accompanied by a promotional campaign involving television and radio appearances, festival performances and live dates. The single subsequently reached number 12 on the UK Singles Chart, becoming Tunstall's highest-charting single in the United Kingdom. The single's physical releases used live material to reinforce Tunstall's reputation as a performer. The UK 7-inch edition pairs the song with a live recording of "Moment of Madness", while the DVD single includes a live performance of "Miniature Disasters" recorded at Glastonbury and a BBC Radio 1 Live Lounge performance of "Get Ur Freak On".

The song's promotional campaign was subsequently expanded into the United States, where "Suddenly I See" was released as a single in 2006. Its profile increased substantially following its inclusion in The Devil Wears Prada, in which the song accompanies the film's opening montage, but it did not appear on the soundtrack album. Tunstall later recalled that she was touring in the United States when the film was released and that she and her band attended a cinema screening, where they discovered that the entire song had been used in the sequence. She described the appearance to Billboard magazine as a "universe shifter" and that having a music video with Meryl Streep and Anne Hathaway in the film gave her a "golden ticket to the rest of the world".

The exposure generated by the film coincided with a substantial expansion of Tunstall's American touring and promotional activity. She undertook television and radio appearances in the United States and continued to perform "Suddenly I See" alongside material from Eye to the Telescope. The American promotional campaign helped establish "Suddenly I See" as one of Tunstall's best-known songs. The song was subsequently released to American radio in several stages, beginning with triple A radio in February 2006 and followed by hot adult contemporary and contemporary hit radio formats later in the year. The single ultimately reached number 21 on the US Billboard Hot 100 chart in February 2007.

== Music video ==
There are three different music videos: one for the UK, one for the US, and one animated. The British version, directed by Big TV!, is a simple performance video in which Tunstall and her band play across from another set of Tunstall and her band. The US version, directed by Patrick Daughters features Tunstall in different situations involving a circus in Romania. Filmed in Bucharest, the video was produced by Black Dog Films and serviced by local production company Domino Productions with producer Catalin Neagu. This version aired for a short time in the US and has seemingly been replaced in rotations by the animated version. The animated version, directed by Honey (i.e., the husband-and-wife directorial team of Laura Kelly and Nicholas Brooks), features Tunstall walking around an animated pop-up fantasy world, and engages in activities such as walking up giant guitars, riding miniature trains, and drifting off into space.

== Live performance ==
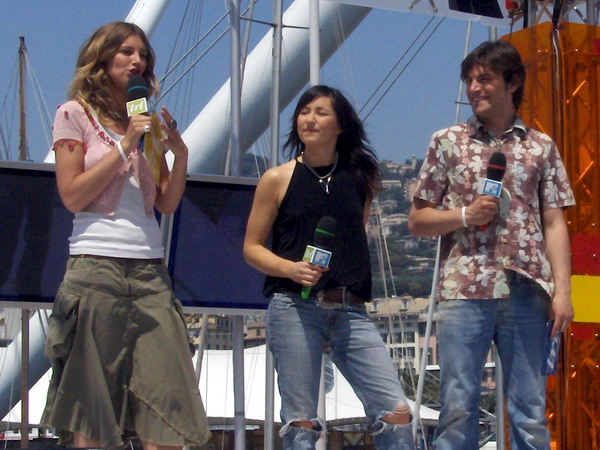
Tunstall (centre) during a promotional appearance on MTV Italy in June 2005

Tunstall performed "Suddenly I See" extensively during the period surrounding its original UK release. The song was included in her festival performances during mid-2005, including her set at the Glastonbury Festival on 25 June, where it appeared alongside "Black Horse and the Cherry Tree", "Another Place to Fall", "Other Side of the World", "Miniature Disasters", "Stoppin' the Love" and "One Day". She also performed at the V Festival in August 2005, with appearances at both the Hylands Park and Weston Park sites.

The song was subsequently performed on Top of the Pops during its 2005 chart run. Tunstall's appearance was included among the programme's performances of the period, with "Suddenly I See" subsequently appearing on BBC Worldwide's The Best of Top of the Pops 2000–2006 compilation. A live recording of "Suddenly I See" from Tunstall's 2005 performance at the Mercury Lounge in New York City was subsequently issued as a bonus track and later as part of the single's digital release. The recording, which runs for approximately five minutes and 25 seconds, documents an extended live arrangement of the song compared with the studio recording. In January 2006, Tunstall made an appearance at NBC's Today studios in New York after an impromptu performance for programme producers led to an offer of a further appearance on the programme.

== Legacy ==
A filmed performance of the song was included in KT Tunstall: Live at Soundstage, a concert programme built around material from Eye to the Telescope and her acoustic repertoire. The performance appears near the end of the programme, following "Black Horse and the Cherry Tree", "Hollywood Hills" and "Heal Over". The song was also included in Tunstall's iTunes Live from SoHo performance series. A live recording of "Suddenly I See" was subsequently released as part of the Live from Soho collection, alongside performances of "Miniature Disasters", "Hold On", "Other Side of the World", "Black Horse and the Cherry Tree", "Hopeless", "If Only", "Saving My Face" and "Paper Aeroplane". The song continued to feature prominently in Tunstall's concerts during the 2010s and 2020s. Its status as one of her signature songs was reinforced by its regular inclusion in setlists, frequently towards the end of the main set or as a show-closing number.

In 2025 and 2026, Tunstall revisited the material from Eye to the Telescope as part of celebrations surrounding the album's twentieth anniversary. "Suddenly I See" was performed as a central part of these shows, alongside "Other Side of the World", "Black Horse and the Cherry Tree", "Another Place to Fall", "Miniature Disasters" and other songs from the album. During the 2026 Eye to the Telescope twentieth-anniversary tour, "Suddenly I See" remained one of Tunstall's most consistently performed songs. It was documented in the setlists for concerts including Santa Fe on 31 January, Park City on 4 and 6 March, and Milwaukee on 4 July 2026. At several of these performances it appeared either as the closing number of the main set or as the encore. The 2026 average setlist data records "Suddenly I See" as the most frequent show closer, appearing as the closing song in nine documented performances, and as a main-set closer in six.

In July 2026, Tunstall performed "Suddenly I See" at the 2026 Commonwealth Games opening ceremony which was hosted by Glasgow in Scotland. She also performed "Black Horse and the Cherry Tree", which TNT Sports described as "stone cold classics".

== Track listings ==
- UK CD single
1. "Suddenly I See" (single version) – 3:17
2. "Girl and the Ghost" – 3:47
- 7-inch single

A. "Suddenly I See" (single version) – 3:17
B. "Moment of Madness" (live) – 4:38

- UK DVD single
1. "Suddenly I See" (video) – 3:17
2. "Miniature Disasters" (live at Glastonbury) – 5:54
3. "Get Ur Freak On" (BBC Radio 1 Live Lounge) – 3:18
- European CD single
1. "Suddenly I See" (single version) – 3:17
2. "Girl and the Ghost" – 3:47
3. "Moment of Madness" – 4:38
4. "Get Ur Freak On" (BBC Radio 1 Live Lounge) – 3:18
- Australasian CD single
1. "Suddenly I See" (radio version)
2. "Other Side of the World" (radio version)
3. "Black Horse and the Cherry Tree" (radio version)
4. "Get Ur Freak On" (BBC Radio 1 Live Lounge)
- Digital download
1. "Suddenly I See" (single version) – 3:20
2. "Suddenly I See" (live from the Mercury Lounge) – 5:25

== Credits and personnel ==
Credits are lifted from the Eye to the Telescope album booklet.

Studios

- Produced at Nam Studios (Bath, Somerset, England)
- Mixed at Metrophonic (London, England)
- Mastered at 360 Mastering (London, England)

Personnel

- KT Tunstall – writing, vocals, guitar
- Arnulf Lindner – baritone guitar, bass
- Luke Bullen – drums, percussion, cajón
- Steve Osborne – production
- Ren Swan – mixing
- Bruno Ellingham – engineering
- Graham Deas – engineering assistance
- Dick Beetham – mastering

== Charts ==
=== Weekly charts ===
Chart (2005–2007)	Peak position
Australia (ARIA)	6
Austria (Ö3 Austria Top 40)	48
Belgium (Ultratip Bubbling Under Flanders)	9
Canada Hot 100 (Billboard)	39
Canada AC (Billboard)	2
Canada Hot AC (Billboard)	9
Finland (Suomen virallinen lista)	19
France (SNEP)	66
Germany (GfK)	89
Hungary (Single Top 40)	25
Ireland (IRMA)	25
Italy (FIMI)	36
Netherlands (Dutch Top 40)	17
Netherlands (Single Top 100)	20
New Zealand (Recorded Music NZ)	5
Scottish Singles Sales (Official Charts)	12
Switzerland (Schweizer Hitparade)	46
UK Singles (Official Charts)	12
US Billboard Hot 100	21
US Adult Alternative Airplay (Billboard)	3
US Adult Contemporary (Billboard)	10
US Adult Pop Airplay (Billboard)	5
US Pop Airplay (Billboard)	33

=== Year-end charts ===
Chart (2005)	Position
UK Singles (OCC)	69

Chart (2007)	Position
Australia (ARIA)	30
US Adult Contemporary (Billboard)	26
US Adult Top 40 (Billboard)	20

== Certifications ==
Region	Certification	Certified units/sales
Australia (ARIA)	Gold	35,000^{^}
Brazil (Pro-Música Brasil)	Gold	30,000^{‡}
Canada (Music Canada)	Platinum	40,000^{*}
Denmark (IFPI Danmark)	Gold	45,000^{‡}
Italy (FIMI)	Gold	50,000^{‡}
New Zealand (RMNZ)	2× Platinum	60,000^{‡}
Spain (Promusicae)	Gold	30,000^{‡}
United Kingdom (BPI)	2× Platinum	1,200,000^{‡}
^{*} Sales figures based on certification alone.^{^} Shipments figures based on certification alone.^{‡} Sales+streaming figures based on certification alone.

== Release history ==
Region	Date	Format(s)	Label(s)	Ref.
United Kingdom	29 August 2005	7-inch vinyl; CD; DVD	Relentless	
Australia	16 January 2006	CD	Relentless	
United States	27 February 2006	Triple A radio	Virgin	
United States	21 August 2006	Hot adult contemporary radio	Virgin	
United States	26 September 2006	Contemporary hit radio	Virgin	
