= Other Side of the World =

2005 single by KT Tunstall

Single by KT Tunstall

from the album Eye to the Telescope
- B-side: "Boo Hoo"; "Morning Stars"; "Throw Me a Rope"
- Released: 9 May 2005
- Length: 3:34
- Label: Relentless; Virgin
- Songwriters: KT Tunstall; Martin Terefe
- Producers: Steve Osborne; Martin Terefe

KT Tunstall UK singles chronology
"Black Horse and the Cherry Tree" (2005)	"Other Side of the World" (2005)	"Suddenly I See" (2005)

KT Tunstall US singles chronology
"Suddenly I See" (2005)	"Other Side of the World" (2006)	"Hold On" (2007)

"Other Side of the World" is a song by Scottish singer-songwriter KT Tunstall, included as the opening track on her debut album, Eye to the Telescope (2004). It was co–written by Tunstall and Martin Terefe, and produced by Steve Osborne and Terefe.

== Background and release ==
The song is about the problems of long-distance relationships and how they seldom work out. It is based on a true story of two friends Tunstall had who were a couple but one lived in Scotland and the other in the United States.

"Other Side of the World" was released 9 May 2005 as the second single from that album and became her first top-20 hit on the UK Singles Chart, peaking at number 13. In February 2007, it was released in the United States as the third and final single from the album. It is reportedly one of Tunstall's favourite songs. As an April Fool's Day joke, Tunstall's manager told her that another artist was about to release a song almost identical to "Other Side of the World", so they would have to shelve Tunstall's release. As she was proud of her song and fell for the prank, Tunstall joked that she would have to do something major to get him back next year.

== Critical reception ==
"Other Side of the World" received positive reviews from music critics. Billboard.com praised the song's "handsome, relaxed acoustic performance" and "imminently singable chorus".

== Track listings ==
UK CD single

1. "Other Side of the World" (single version)
2. "Boo Hoo"

UK limited-edition 7-inch single

A. "Other Side of the World" (single version) – 3:32
B. "Morning Stars" – 2:46

UK DVD single

1. "Other Side of the World" (video)
2. "Black Horse and the Cherry Tree" (video)
3. "Throw Me a Rope" (audio)

UK and US digital download

1. "Other Side of the World" (radio version)

European CD single

1. "Other Side of the World" (single version)
2. "Throw Me a Rope"
3. "Boo Hoo"
4. "Morning Stars"

== Credits and personnel ==
Credits are lifted from the Eye to the Telescope album booklet.

Studios

- Strings recorded at Little Big Sound (Nashville, Tennessee)
- Mixed at Metrophonic (London, England)
- Mastered at 360 Mastering (London, England)

Personnel

- KT Tunstall – writing, vocals, guitar, Wurlitzer
- Martin Terefe – writing, keyboards, production
- Arnulf Lindner – bass
- Luke Bullen – drums
- Andreas Olsson – drum programming
- Steve Osborne – Shelltone, production
- The Love Sponge Strings – strings
- David Davidson – first violin, string arrangement
- David Angell – second violin
- Kristin Wilkinson – viola
- John Catchings – cello
- Andy Green – additional production
- Baeho "Bobby" Shin – string recording
- Ren Swan – mixing
- Bruno Ellingham – engineering
- Graham Deas – engineering assistance
- Dick Beetham – mastering

== Charts ==
=== Weekly charts ===
Chart (2005–2006)	Peak position
Australia Hitseekers (ARIA)	7
Ireland (IRMA)	25
Italy (FIMI)	22
Netherlands (Dutch Top 40)	21
Netherlands (Single Top 100)	21
Scotland Singles (OCC)	10
UK Singles (OCC)	13
US Adult Alternative Airplay (Billboard)	7
US Adult Pop Airplay (Billboard)	18

=== Year-end charts ===
Chart (2005)	Position
Brazil (Crowley)	37
UK Singles (OCC)	121

== Certifications ==
Region	Certification	Certified units/sales
United Kingdom (BPI)	Silver	200,000^{‡}
^{‡} Sales+streaming figures based on certification alone.

== Release history ==
Region	Date	Format(s)	Label(s)	Ref.
United Kingdom	9 May 2005	7-inch vinyl; CD; DVD	Relentless	
Australia	1 August 2005	CD	Relentless	
United States	13 February 2007	Digital download	Relentless; Virgin	
