= Black Rainbows (Brett Anderson album) =

Studio album by Brett Anderson
- Released: 26 September 2011
- Genre: Indie rock
- Length: 39:27
- Label: B A Songs
- Producers: Brett Anderson, Leo Abrahams

Brett Anderson chronology
Slow Attack (2009)	Black Rainbows (2011)

Professional ratings
Aggregate scores
Source	Rating
AnyDecentMusic?	6.1/10
Metacritic	64/100
Review scores
Source	Rating
AllMusic	link
Clash	5/10 link
Filter	82% link
The Independent	link
MusicOMH	link
NME	7/10 link
Pitchfork	5.8/10 link
PopMatters	link
The Press	link
Record Collector	link

Black Rainbows is the fourth solo album by the English singer-songwriter Brett Anderson, released on 26 September 2011. This is Anderson's first solo album following Suede's reformation in 2010.

Anderson stated that Black Rainbows will be "restless, noisy and dynamic" and described it as a return to the rock band format.

Critically, the album was a major improvement over previous records as it garnered generally favourable reviews from critics, scoring 64 based on 13 critics at aggregator website Metacritic.

== Track listing ==
All songs written by Brett Anderson, Leo Abrahams, Leopold Ross and Seb Rochford except where noted.

Black Rainbows track listing
No.	Title	Writer(s)	Length
1.	"Unsung"		4:11
2.	"Brittle Heart"		4:08
3.	"Crash About to Happen"		3:37
4.	"I Count the Times"		3:48
5.	"The Exiles"		3:49
6.	"This Must Be Where It Ends"	Anderson, Ross, Abrahams	3:57
7.	"Actors"		3:36
8.	"In the House of Numbers"		4:10
9.	"Thin Men Dancing"		3:15
10.	"Possession"		4:54
