= Wilderness (Brett Anderson album) =

Studio album by Brett Anderson
- Released: 7 July 2008
- Recorded: 12–18 May 2008
- Studios: RAK Studios, The Pierce Rooms
- Genres: Indie rock, art rock, baroque pop, acoustic rock
- Length: 35:48
- Label: BA Songs
- Producers: Brett Anderson, Fred Ball

Brett Anderson chronology
Live at Queen Elizabeth Hall (2007)	Wilderness (2008)	Slow Attack (2009)

Singles from Wilderness
- 1. "Back to You" Released: 9 July 2007; 2. "A Different Place" Released: 21 July 2008

Wilderness is the second studio album by the English singer Brett Anderson.

== Background ==
Wilderness was created with minimal use of instrumentation and studio production. Singer Brett Anderson opted for a pared-back sound, singing and playing piano alongside cellist Amy Langley. Wilderness was recorded and mixed in only seven days. The cover photograph is by Allan Jenkins. Anderson is keen to make the live shows of Wilderness symbolise an intimate affair. "The live shows will be very minimalist with just myself and a cello player on stage." Speaking on the album's much lower media profile compared with his previous work, Anderson said: "I have no record company, no publisher and a smaller audience but I have never been more confident and focused about what I am doing as an artist."

== Release ==
According to Anderson's manager Ian Grenfell, promoting Wilderness was not going to follow the usual "rule book". He said: "Brett knew exactly what record he wanted to make, and we recognized it was unlikely to get radio airplay, so we've put a [marketing] structure around it that makes sense commercially." The album was released on Anderson's own BA Songs label. Fans who bought tickets for his performance at London's Mermaid Theatre on 7 July 2008 received the album on a USB stick. Members of the Bowers & Wilkins Music Club could download it from the club's website from 9 July. A download release followed on 29 July, with a limited CD release through Coalition independent music retailers on 11 August and a general release on 1 September.

== Reception ==
Professional ratings
Aggregate scores
Source	Rating
Metacritic	46/100
Review scores
Source	Rating
AllMusic	4/5 stars
The Guardian	2/5 stars
The Independent	1/5 stars
Metro	3/5 stars
Mojo	2/5 stars
musicOMH	4/5 stars
NME	1.5/5 stars
The Press	4/5 stars
Q	3/5 stars
The Sunday Times	2/5 stars

The album received mixed reviews from critics. At Metacritic, which assigns a normalized rating out of 100 to reviews from mainstream critics, the album has an average score of 46 out of 100, which indicates "mixed or average reviews" based on 6 reviews. Sam Wolfson of The Guardian was unimpressed, saying that "Anderson had reached a creative menopause." Rick Martin of NME wrote: "Most depressing of all is that Brett Anderson, once one of Britain’s most beguiling indie-pop stars, has become this irrelevant." Andy Gill of The Independent was also negative, saying: "this slim suite of melancholy reveries should polish off what remains of Anderson's fanbase." He did, however have kind words for the single "Back to You", calling it a "half-decent song" and his pick of the album.

AllMusic were more favourable, Stephen Thomas Erlewine wrote: "For those who are still paying attention, it's actually quite nice to hear Anderson reconnecting to that initial spark while finding ways to experiment. It may not make him a star again, but Wilderness does find Brett Anderson creatively revitalized." Also favourable was Jenni Cole of musicOMH, who wrote: "Wilderness is a slow burner, a gentle and fragile album stripped of the raw emotion of earlier Anderson efforts but no worse for that."

== Track listing ==
1. "A Different Place" – 4:12
2. "The Empress" – 3:39
3. "Clowns" – 3:03
4. "Chinese Whispers" – 3:21
5. "Blessed" – 4:41
6. "Funeral Mantra" – 2:57
7. "Back to You" Feat. Emmanuelle Seigner – 3:14
8. "Knife Edge" – 3:02
9. "P. Marius" – 4:37
10. "Symmetry" – 2:40 (iTunes Bonus Track)

== Personnel ==
Credits adapted from Wilderness liner notes.

Musicians

- Brett Anderson − lead and backing vocals, guitar, piano, keyboards, tabla, percussion
- Amy Langley − cello
- Emmanuelle Seigner − vocals (7)

Production

- Brett Anderson − production
- Fred Ball − production, string arrangements
- Steve Fitzmaurice − engineering, mixing
- Bunt Stafford Clark − mastering
- Dan Morrison − mixing
- Raj Das − mixing
- Allan Jenkins − photography
