= Eden Studios =

Eden Studios may refer to:

- Eden Studios (recording facility), a commercial recording facility in west London
- Eden Studios (game publisher), a table top role-playing game developing company
- Eden Games, a French video game design and development company created in 1998 which was known by the name Eden Studios until 2003
