= Black Horse and the Cherry Tree =

2005 single by KT Tunstall

Single by KT Tunstall

from the album Eye to the Telescope
- B-side: "One Day" (live); "Barbie"
- Released: 21 February 2005
- Genre: Folk rock; folk
- Length: 2:51
- Label: Relentless
- Songwriter: KT Tunstall
- Producer: Andy Green

KT Tunstall UK singles chronology
"Throw Me a Rope" (2004)	"Black Horse and the Cherry Tree" (2005)	"Other Side of the World" (2005)

KT Tunstall US singles chronology
"Black Horse and the Cherry Tree" (2005)	"Suddenly I See" (2006)

Audio sample
- file; help

"Black Horse and the Cherry Tree" is a song by Scottish singer-songwriter KT Tunstall from her 2004 debut album, Eye to the Telescope. The track was released on 21 February 2005 as the lead single from the album, charting at No. 28 on the UK Singles Chart the same month. The following year, the single became a hit outside Europe, reaching No. 7 in Canada and No. 20 in both the United States and New Zealand.

== Background ==
"Black Horse and the Cherry Tree" was written by KT Tunstall for her debut studio album, Eye to the Telescope. Tunstall said that the song originated partly from a vivid memory of travelling through Greece on a moped as a teenager, when she encountered a large black stallion that had broken loose in an olive grove. She described the image as having an "apocalyptic" quality, which remained with her and later provided the central imagery for the song. Tunstall subsequently developed the song several years later while working in a small studio in Shepherd's Bush, London. She had been influenced by a performance by the blues musician Son of Dave, whose stripped-back approach prompted her to experiment with creating a rhythmically driven recording using guitar, vocals and effects. Tunstall borrowed an Akai Headrush looping pedal and used it to construct the song by layering individual musical parts. She recalled that the song was written in approximately ten minutes, making it one of the quickest compositions she had written for the album.

The song's narrative uses surreal imagery as a metaphor for personal choice and uncertainty. Tunstall described the black horse as representing "good and evil" and said that the song reflected the process of making her first album and the difficult decisions she encountered while moving from an independent musician towards a recording career. She characterised its central theme as learning to trust one's instincts and "dig incredibly deep" to determine one's identity. The lyric referring to Tunstall's heart "stops dead" was also autobiographical. She explained that it referred to a heart murmur she had experienced as a baby and was incorporated into the song as part of its wider imagery concerning fear, instinct and personal decision-making.

== Release ==
"Black Horse and the Cherry Tree" was included on Eye to the Telescope, which was initially released in 2004. Its subsequent release as a single in the United Kingdom in 2005 helped establish the song as one of Tunstall's signature recordings. The single entered the UK Singles Chart in March 2005 and peaked at number 28.

KT Tunstall said of the song:

"Black Horse and the Cherry Tree" is inspired by old blues, Nashville psycho hillbillies & hazy memories. It tells the story of finding yourself lost on your path, and a choice has to be made. It's about gambling, fate, listening to your heart, and having the strength to fight the darkness that's always willing to carry you off.

The song was subsequently covered by Aly & AJ for the Yahoo! Music programme Pepsi Smash. Their acoustic version was recorded at Abbey Road Studios and was subsequently included on the Japanese re-release of their second studio album, Insomniatic. In the United States, "Black Horse and the Cherry Tree" was also used in promotional advertisements for the WB television series Pepper Dennis in 2006. The song was also used in promotional advertising for USA Network's coverage of the 2006 US Open tennis championships. Contemporary discussions of the campaign identified Tunstall's song as the music used in the network's promotional advertisements.

The song's breakthrough was closely associated with Tunstall's performance on the BBC television programme Later... with Jools Holland. Her appearance, performed using the looping technique that became characteristic of the song, brought her performance to a wider audience and contributed to the subsequent attention surrounding both the single and Eye to the Telescope. The song later received a nomination for Best Female Pop Vocal Performance at the 49th Annual Grammy Awards in 2007.

== Composition ==
The song is usually performed solo by Tunstall, with the layered guitar and vocals constructed piece-by-piece by sampling the parts live, and using a loop pedal unit to create the backing track. The album version of "Black Horse and the Cherry Tree" was used as the opening theme for the CBC Television drama Wild Roses, which premiered in January 2009. Contemporary material relating to the programme identifies Tunstall's song as its theme music.

The recording became particularly associated with Tunstall's use of a looping pedal, which enabled her to perform the song as a one-person arrangement by recording rhythmic guitar and vocal parts sequentially and playing them back while performing additional parts live. Tunstall later discussed the song as an example of the importance of looping to her songwriting and performance style, describing the technology as a means of combining rhythm, melody and harmony within a solo performance.

== Chart performance ==
In the United Kingdom, the single peaked at No. 28 in its first week and dropped out of the top 75 in three weeks. In the United States, "Black Horse and the Cherry Tree" was initially in the bottom half of the US Billboard Hot 100 chart. Only after Katharine McPhee sang the song on American Idol (in the 5th season) as part of a Billboard charts-based song selection did the tune rise rapidly in popularity; it jumped 56 positions on the US Billboard Hot 100 chart, going from No. 79 to No. 23, and then moving to No. 20, becoming Tunstall's first single (and only, to date) to appear on that chart's Top 20. McPhee would go on to sing the song again in her final performance show on 23 May 2006, finishing second to Taylor Hicks.

== Track listings ==
UK and European CD single

1. "Black Horse & the Cherry Tree"
2. "One Day" (live)

UK 7-inch single

A. "Black Horse & the Cherry Tree" – 2:51
B. "Barbie" – 2:23

Australian CD single

1. "Black Horse & the Cherry Tree"
2. "One Day" (live)
3. "Barbie"
4. "Black Horse & the Cherry Tree" (instrumental)

== Credits and personnel ==
Credits are lifted from the Eye to the Telescope album booklet.

Studios

- Mixed at Metrophonic (London, England)
- Mastered at 360 Mastering (London, England)

Personnel

- KT Tunstall – writing, vocals, guitar, bass, percussion
- Luke Bullen – percussion
- Andy Green – production
- Steve Osborne – original vocal recording
- Ren Swan – mixing
- Bruno Ellingham – engineering
- Graham Deas – engineering assistance
- Dick Beetham – mastering

== Charts ==
=== Weekly charts ===
Chart (2005–2007)	Peak position
Austria (Ö3 Austria Top 40)	31
Belgium (Ultratop 50 Flanders)	35
Belgium (Ultratip Bubbling Under Wallonia)	8
Canada Hot 100 (Billboard)	51
Canada AC (Billboard)	1
Canada All-Format Airplay (Billboard)	16
Canada CHR/Top 40 (Billboard)	28
Canada Digital Song Sales (Billboard)	7
Canada Hot AC (Billboard)	26
Canada Hot AC Top 30 (Radio & Records)	22
France (SNEP)	23
Germany (GfK)	51
Ireland (IRMA)	16
Italy (FIMI)	10
Netherlands (Single Top 100)	80
New Zealand (Recorded Music NZ)	20
Scottish Singles Sales (Official Charts)	10
Switzerland (Schweizer Hitparade)	92
UK Singles (Official Charts)	28
US Billboard Hot 100	20
US Adult Alternative Airplay (Billboard)	1
US Adult Contemporary (Billboard)	4
US Adult Pop Airplay (Billboard)	1
US Pop Airplay (Billboard)	15

=== Year-end charts ===
Chart (2006)	Position
US Billboard Hot 100	57
US Adult Contemporary (Billboard)	12
US Adult Top 40 (Billboard)	5

Chart (2007)	Position
US Adult Contemporary (Billboard)	21

== Certifications ==
Region	Certification	Certified units/sales
Canada (Music Canada)	Platinum	40,000^{*}
New Zealand (RMNZ)	Gold	15,000^{‡}
United Kingdom (BPI)	Gold	400,000^{‡}
^{*} Sales figures based on certification alone.^{‡} Sales+streaming figures based on certification alone.

== Release history ==
Region	Date	Format(s)	Label(s)	Ref.
United Kingdom	21 February 2005	7-inch vinyl; CD	Relentless	
United States	3 October 2005	Triple A radio	Virgin	
United States	9 January 2006	Hot adult contemporary radio	Virgin	
United States	27 March 2006	Contemporary hit radio	Virgin	
