= Eye to the Telescope =

Studio album by KT Tunstall
- Released: 13 December 2004
- Studios: Nam Studios (Bath, England)
- Length: 45:44
- Label: Relentless
- Producers: Steve Osborne; Andy Green; Martin Terefe

KT Tunstall chronology
False Alarm EP (2004)	Eye to the Telescope (2004)	KT Tunstall's Acoustic Extravaganza (2006)

Alternative cover
- American edition cover

Singles from Eye to the Telescope
- 1. "Black Horse and the Cherry Tree" Released: 21 February 2005; 2. "Other Side of the World" Released: 9 May 2005; 3. "Suddenly I See" Released: 29 August 2005; 4. "Under the Weather" Released: 5 December 2005; 5. "Another Place to Fall" Released: 13 March 2006

Eye to the Telescope is the debut studio album by Scottish singer-songwriter KT Tunstall, originally released on 13 December 2004 and re-released 10 January 2005 by Relentless Records. On 19 July 2005, it was nominated for the 2005 Mercury Music Prize in the United Kingdom. Tunstall promoted the album in the United States and Canada in December 2005. The album was released on 7 February 2006 in the US. A special CD/DVD edition of the album was released in September 2006 in the United States, along with a different cover and a bonus track.

The album was a strong seller worldwide, selling over five million copies internationally, and became the 51st best-selling album of the 2000s decade in the United Kingdom. It spawned five singles – "Black Horse and the Cherry Tree", "Other Side of the World", "Suddenly I See", "Under the Weather" and "Another Place to Fall", all of which achieved considerable commercial success in 2005 and 2006.

A 20th Anniversary (Stargazer) Edition was released on 31st October 2025 as a 2LP vinyl edition (on blue and pink vinyl), 2CD edition, 4CD edition and combined vinyl and CD versions. The vinyl and 2CD versions have the original album on one disc and a Stargazer EP plus live tracks recorded at the BBC on the second disc. The Stargazer EP consists of three tracks recorded as part of the original recording sessions, including the title track 'Eye To the Telescope'.

== Background ==
Tunstall came to public prominence following her performance of "Black Horse and the Cherry Tree" on Later... with Jools Holland in 2004. Tunstall's parents and friends were not interested in music, and she began writing music and playing guitar at the age of fifteen years old. She performed her first gig at a venue called The Vic in her native St Andrews after learning to play guitar. Her performance was described as being like a "fish in water", credited to her confidence and ability to "hold the court" in the room. Following the gig, Tunstall was asked to join a band by a member of the audience, and began performing backing vocals in the band on a frequent basis. She described making the album as "fantastically scrappy", with only a "handful" of musical friends.

Tunstall began writing songs using a piano, and were often piano style ballads. Her earlier musical sound had become shelved by the time she began writing and recording for Eye to the Telescope. During the writing of "Black Horse and the Cherry Tree", Tunstall claimed she "didn't even sit down" during the writing. Following this, Tunstall signed a small recording contract with Capitol Records before she was released from the contract three days later. The only other offer of a recording contract was with Relentless Records, worth £23,000 at the time. As a result, Tunstall says that the album sounds "underground", and she deliberately stayed as an independent artist as she didn't want to sign a recording contract, but ultimately had to if she wanted to release the album. She later said that the song "Black Horse and the Cherry Tree" was inspired by the fact she felt like she was "signing her soul away to the devil" by signing a recording contract. The riffs of the song are a result of Tunstall trying to learn to work the pedals she was provided with during her time performing lead vocals for a band she was a member of. She was on tour with the band during her performance on Jools Holland, and returned to her touring schedule the following day.

== Composition ==
The album was described as being like an album "written by someone much further in their career" by music blogger Paul Laird. "Other Side of the World" was described by Tunstall as one of her first co-written songs, which she wrote together with Martin Terefe. Her partnership with him for the writing of the song allowed Tunstall to be vulnerable in her style of writing, and credited him for pushing her to be more personal in her writing ability. Ultimately, the song is about a long-distance relationship, and Tunstall said that she used a "Swedish way of speaking" in some parts of the song, and placing a stronger emphasis on some words throughout, as a result of her partnership with Terefe. The BBC said of the album that it was obvious "a master was at work" during the writing of the album. Lyrically, the album was inspired by The Beatles and with Radiohead influences, something later confirmed by co-writer for the album Terefe. He credited the songwriting for the album as being inspired as a result of "playing" with different musical instruments, and experimenting with them and finding out what the final sound would be like.

"Suddenly I See" took its inspiration for its riff throughout the song from listening to blues, which Tunstall listened to each morning whilst driving to the studio. They wished to recreate the same "blues feel" on "Suddenly I See", with Tunstall wishing to explore Bo Didley style beats for the recording. The song was inspired by Tunstall having a feeling of wishing to show people her ability, and to stop trying to convince others that she could have a successful musical career. Tunstall said that her feeling stemmed from seeing Patti Smith on a cover and her perceived confidence, which she later claimed was "something she wanted" as well. It was not initially considered as a single release, and during the recording session of the album, it was never suggested as a single due to the fear of it being written in a commercialised manner in order to become successful. It was described as "fun" to record during the sessions.

== Production ==
Producer Steve Osborne realised both the passion and strong ability Tunstall had for playing guitar, and wished to use this as an advantage during the production of the album. He wanted to find something that separated Tunstall from other solo artists, and attributed her guitar playing as being "like a drummer". He wanted Tunstall to play with a guitar during each of the recording sessions as a result of her passion for playing guitar, recognising that her right hand was almost a crucial part in ensuring that Tunstall "sounded right" during the recording sessions.

== Critical reception ==
Professional ratings
Aggregate scores
Source	Rating
Metacritic	76/100
Review scores
Source	Rating
AllMusic	4/5 stars
The Guardian	4/5 stars
PopMatters	7/10 stars
Slant Magazine	3/5 stars
Yahoo! Music UK	7/10 stars
Q Magazine	4/5 stars

Reviews for Eye to the Telescope were positive. Mark A. Price of PopMatters gave the album a score of 7 out of 10, noting that it manages to sound "both new and familiar", mixing influences from artists like Melissa Etheridge and Fiona Apple, while adding some originality of her own. Stephen Thomas Erlewine of AllMusic gave it four stars out of five, calling it "a promising, satisfying debut". On Metacritic, Eye to the Telescope has a score of 76 out of 100, indicating "generally favorable reviews".

The album has been described as "an iconic and beloved record that defined an era of British music in the 2000s" by Brendon Veevers of Renowned for Sound. Despite this, at the time of its release, the BBC described the album was "extremely frustrating" as a result of songs such as "Under The Weather" and "Through The Dark" having a lack of engagement, however, did claim that there was "promising signs of a new found confidence and willingness to take risks" on the song "Black Horse and the Cherry Tree".

== Chart performance ==
The album entered the UK album chart at 73 and quickly dropped out again (it originally entered the lower regions of the Top 200 in its debut week, but these placings are not officially recorded for statistical purposes). It re-entered at 66 a few weeks later, and its rise was both surprising and unique for a new album on the UK charts. It improved every week for four weeks before peaking at number 36, then dropping down as low as 63 again. It then resumed a somewhat meteoric rise, culminating in a peak of number seven before slowly shifting back down. The publicity surrounding Tunstall's Mercury Music Prize nomination sent it back up the charts to an eventual peak of No. 3, after which time it became a Top 20 mainstay for the rest of 2005. It dropped out of the Top 10 in the 61st week, and has dropped continually since, before ending its run at 72 weeks. After a several month absence, the album returned at No. 66 for a 73rd non-consecutive week in August 2006.

The singles from the album became increasingly more successful, with "Other Side of the World" spending almost five months on the chart and "Suddenly I See" remaining in the Top 40 for 10 weeks. The album's next single, "Under the Weather", entered the chart at No. 39, while the fifth and final single, "Another Place to Fall", became Tunstall's first single to miss the Top 40 after more than 1.3 million copies of the album had been sold. In total, Tunstall has spent 133 weeks so far on the British charts.

The album was certified 5× platinum by the Irish album chart selling about 75,000 copies, and shipping 1.5 million copies in the UK, certifying it 5× platinum there as well. It was also certified platinum in Canada in January 2007. Worldwide, the album has sold 2.6 million copies.

== Track listing ==
All tracks produced by Steve Osborne, except for track 1, "Other Side of the World", which is produced by Osborne and Martin Terefe, and track 4, "Black Horse and the Cherry Tree", which is produced by Andy Green.

Original European release
No.	Title	Length
1.	"Other Side of the World"	3:34
2.	"Another Place to Fall"	4:11
3.	"Under the Weather"	3:37
4.	"Suddenly I See"	3:22
5.	"Miniature Disasters"	3:32
6.	"Silent Sea"	3:48
7.	"Universe & U"	4:01
8.	"False Alarm"	3:50
9.	"Heal Over"	4:27
10.	"Stoppin' the Love"	4:02
11.	"Through the Dark"	3:48
12.	"Black Horse and the Cherry Tree" (live on Later... with Jools Holland)	4:47

International release and European reissue
No.	Title	Writer(s)	Length
1.	"Other Side of the World"	KT Tunstall, Martin Terefe	3:34
2.	"Another Place to Fall"	Tunstall	4:11
3.	"Under the Weather"	Tunstall, Tommy D	3:37
4.	"Black Horse and the Cherry Tree"	Tunstall	2:51
5.	"Miniature Disasters"	Tunstall	3:32
6.	"Silent Sea"	Tunstall, Jimmy Hogarth	3:48
7.	"Universe & U"	Tunstall, Pleasure	4:01
8.	"False Alarm"	Tunstall, Terefe	3:50
9.	"Suddenly I See"	Tunstall	3:22
10.	"Stoppin' the Love"	Tunstall, Tommy D	4:02
11.	"Heal Over"	Tunstall	4:27
12.	"Through the Dark"	Tunstall, Terefe	3:48

CD/DVD bonus track
No.	Title	Writer(s)	Length
13.	"Immune" (live from One Night in Gaia)	Tunstall	4:51

iTunes bonus track
No.	Title	Length
13.	"Black & White"	2:45

Japanese bonus track
No.	Title	Writer(s)	Length
13.	"Boo Hoo" (Acoustic Extravaganza version)	Tunstall	4:56

Notes

- The original edition of the album, released in December 2004, had a slightly different track order and did not include the studio version of "Black Horse and the Cherry Tree"; the version of the track recorded on Later... with Jools Holland was included as a "bonus live track".

== Personnel ==
Credits adapted from the album's liner notes.

- KT Tunstall – vocals (tracks 1–4, 6, 8–9, 11–12, Lead: 5, 7, 10), guitar (1–11), wurlitzer (1, 10), pianet (3, 7), Shelltone horn (3), piano (2, 5, 8, 12), Doepfer bass (4, 7), chimes (8), additional percussion (4)
- Steve Osborne – shelltone horn (tracks 1–2), bass (2, 5, 11), additional guitar (2, 7, 10–11), percussion (5), moog synthesizer (7), background vocals (7, 10), audio mixing (10)
- Arnulf Lindner – double bass (tracks 1–2), bass guitar (3, 6, 8–9), baritone guitar (6, 9)
- Luke Bullen – drums (tracks 1–3, 5–12), percussion (3–4, 9–10), cajon (5–6, 9–10)
- Martin Terefe – additional keyboards (track 1)
- Ian Burdge – cello (tracks 2, 10)

== Charts ==
=== Weekly charts ===
Weekly chart performance for Eye to the Telescope
Chart (2005–2006)	Peak position
Australian Albums (ARIA)	43
Austrian Albums (Ö3 Austria)	41
Belgian Albums (Ultratop Flanders)	72
Belgian Albums (Ultratop Wallonia)	76
Canadian Albums (Billboard)	41
Dutch Albums (Album Top 100)	53
French Albums (SNEP)	7
German Albums (Offizielle Top 100)	43
Irish Albums (IRMA)	4
Italian Albums (FIMI)	37
New Zealand Albums (RMNZ)	3
Norwegian Albums (VG-lista)	11
Scottish Albums (Official Charts)	1
Swiss Albums (Schweizer Hitparade)	29
UK Albums (Official Charts)	3
US Billboard 200	33
US Top Rock Albums (Billboard)	9

=== Year-end charts ===
2005 year-end chart performance for Eye to the Telescope
Chart (2005)	Position
European Albums (Billboard)	33
Irish Albums (IRMA)	14
UK Albums (OCC)	7

2006 year-end chart performance for Eye to the Telescope
Chart (2006)	Position
European Albums (Billboard)	55
New Zealand Albums (RMNZ)	8
UK Albums (OCC)	34
US Billboard 200	74
US Top Rock Albums (Billboard)	12

2007 year-end chart performance for Eye to the Telescope
Chart (2007)	Position
UK Albums (OCC)	149
US Billboard 200	137

=== Decade-end charts ===
Decade-end chart performance for Eye to the Telescope
Chart (2000–09)	Position
UK Albums (OCC)	51

== Certifications ==
Certifications for Eye to the Telescope
Region	Certification	Certified units/sales
Canada (Music Canada)	Platinum	100,000^{^}
France (SNEP)	Gold	100,000^{*}
Ireland (IRMA)	5× Platinum	75,000^{^}
New Zealand (RMNZ)	Platinum	15,000^{^}
Switzerland (IFPI Switzerland)	Gold	20,000^{^}
United Kingdom (BPI)	5× Platinum	1,682,867
United States (RIAA)	Platinum	1,300,000
Summaries
Europe (IFPI)	2× Platinum	2,000,000^{*}
Worldwide	—	4,000,000
^{*} Sales figures based on certification alone.^{^} Shipments figures based on certification alone.

== Release history ==
Eye to the Telescope release history
Region	Date	Label	Format	Catalogue
United Kingdom	13 December 2004	Relentless	CD	CDREL06
United Kingdom	10 January 2005	Relentless	CD + LP	CDRELX06 + LPREL06
United States	7 February 2006	Virgin	CD	507292
United States	12 September 2006	Virgin	CD+DVD	747292

== See also ==
- List of best-selling albums of the 2000s (decade) in the United Kingdom
