= KT Tunstall's Acoustic Extravaganza =

Studio album by KT Tunstall
- Released: 15 May 2006
- Recorded: Vital Spark Studios; December 2005
- Genre: Folk rock; alternative rock
- Label: Relentless
- Producer: Steve Osborne

KT Tunstall chronology
Eye to the Telescope (2004)	KT Tunstall's Acoustic Extravaganza (2006)	Drastic Fantastic (2007)

KT Tunstall's Acoustic Extravaganza is a compilation album by Scottish singer-songwriter KT Tunstall released on 15 May 2006. It was originally only available through her website. The CD comes with a DVD, which includes the making of the album and features about her songs and her equipment, namely her Akai Professional E2 headrush loop pedal which is known as her "Wee Bastard".

The Acoustic Extravaganza version of "Universe & U" was featured in the Grey's Anatomy season two episode, "Deterioration of the Fight or Flight Response", and in the Volume 2 Soundtrack.

== Critical reception ==
Professional ratings
Review scores
Source	Rating
living.scotsman.com	3/5 stars
Rolling Stone	3/5 stars

== Track listing ==
All tracks written by KT Tunstall except "Golden Age", written by Beck David Hansen.

CD

1. "Ashes" – 3:34 (new song, released as a promo single)
2. "Girl and the Ghost" – 4:14 (First released on the "Suddenly I See" single)
3. "One Day" – 5:02 (First released on the "Black Horse and the Cherry Tree" single)
4. "Golden Age" – 5:00 (Beck cover)
5. "Boo Hoo" – 4:56 (First released on the "Other Side of the World" single)
6. "Gone to the Dogs" – 3:59 (Featured on the demo album Tracks in July)
7. "Change" – 3:44 (Featured on the demo album Tracks in July)
8. "Miniature Disasters" – 4:32 (Acoustic version of song of debut album)
9. "Universe & U" – 4:31 (Acoustic version of song of debut album/released on the "Another Place to Fall" single)
10. "Throw Me a Rope" – 3:43 (Acoustic version of first single)

DVD

1. "Five Go to Skye (Making the Album)"
2. "Gone to the Dogs"
3. "Throw Me a Rope"
4. "The Wee Bastard Pedal"
5. "Out-takes"

== Personnel ==
- KT Tunstall — vocals, guitar
- Luke Bullen — drums, percussion, cajon
- Kenny Dickenson – trumpet, backing vocals, percussion, glockenspiel, Hammond organ, melodica
- Arnulf Lindner – double bass
- Sam Lewis – lead guitar
- Donna Maciocia – backing vocals – lead singer of Amplifico
- Chris Harley – shaker

== Charts ==
Chart (2007)	Peak position
UK Album Chart	32
French Album Chart	188
