= Soundedit Festival =

SOUNDEDIT International Festival of Music Producers and Sound Designers
- Locations: Łódź, Poland
- Years active: 2009 – present
- Organiser: Art Industry Foundation
- Website: http://www.soundedit.pl

SOUNDEDIT is an annual, international festival dedicated to music producers and sound designers. Since its beginning in 2009, the festival has been taking place in Łódź, Poland. The main award of the festival is The Man with the Golden Ear Award.

== Winners ==
=== 2009 ===
- Daniel Lanois
- Gareth Jones
- Grzegorz Ciechowski (posthumously)

=== 2010 ===
- Adrian Sherwood
- Andrzej Smolik
- Martin Hannett (posthumously)

=== 2011 ===
- Mark "Flood" Ellis
- Daniel Miller
- Adam Toczko

=== 2012 ===
- Martin „Youth” Glover
- Józef B. Nowakowski
- Steve Osborne
- Eugeniusz Rudnik
- Tim Simenon

=== 2013 ===
- Dan Austin
- Haydn Bendall
- Władysław Komendarek
- Bill Laswell

=== 2014 ===
- Karl Bartos
- Howard Bernstein (Howie B)
- John Cale
- Lech Janerka

=== 2015 ===
- Bob Geldof
- Roger Glover
- Wojciech Waglewski
- Józef Skrzek
- Leszek Biolik

=== 2016 ===
- Brian Eno
- Alec Empire
- Adam Nowak
- George Martin

=== 2017 ===
- Marek Biliński
- Gary Numan
- Michael Nyman
- Tony Visconti

=== 2018 ===
- Andrzej Korzyński
- Giorgio Moroder
- Katarzyna Nosowska

=== 2019 ===
- Craig Leon
- Jan Borysewicz
- Mick Harvey
- Stanislaw Soyka
- Steve Albini

=== 2020 ===
- Jan Kanty Pawluśkiewicz
- Roli Mosimann

=== 2021 ===
- Midge Ure
- Skalpel
- Tomek Lipiński

=== 2022 ===
- Barry Adamson
- Leszek Kamiński
- Nick Mason
- Piotr Madziar

=== 2023 ===
- Hania Rani
- Irena Hussar
- Michał Urbaniak

=== 2024 ===
- Steve Lyon
- Chris Thomas
- Czesław Niemen
- Tadeusz Mieczkowski

On 26th of October 2024, the Golden Ears Awards ceremony presented its awards and celebrated the careers of 4 music personalities who have shaped our musical experiences: Tadeusz Mieczkowski, Czesław Niemen (posthumously), Chris Thomas and Steve Lyon.
