= She's in Fashion =

1999 single by Suede

Single by Suede

from the album Head Music
- B-side: "Bored"; "Pieces of My Mind"; "Jubilee"; "God's Gift"; "Down" (demo)
- Released: 21 June 1999
- Genre: Pop
- Length: 4:53
- Label: Nude
- Songwriters: Brett Anderson; Neil Codling
- Producers: Steve Osborne; Mick Glossop

Suede singles chronology
"Electricity" (1999)	"She's in Fashion" (1999)	"Everything Will Flow" (1999)

Audio sample
- "She's in Fashion": file; help

"She's in Fashion" is the second single from Suede's fourth studio album, Head Music (1999). It was released on 21 June 1999 and peaked at number 13 on the UK Singles Chart, number 10 in Finland, and number 59 in Sweden.

== Background and recording ==
A swirling synth line helps build the song into a dreamy, uptempo track, quite unlike anything the band had previously made. NME said the song "features oriental-type keyboards, and sounds like a cross between pop David Bowie and The Chi-Lites." "She's in Fashion" has been described as "the most summery-sounding pop song Suede have recorded." Obtaining this sound required months of heavy production work, several re-recordings and a lot of experimentation. Cowriter and keyboardist Neil Codling said the song was recorded in four different ways, describing it as "one of those stubborn songs [which] was determined to be a summer single."

"It's one of Suede's more brazen attempts to be a pop band. The very first demo that Neil did was just this weird, looped keyboard riff with a kind of Hawaiian bassline and acoustic guitar over the top. We spent months trying to make it dancey or a bit harsher or whatever, and we ended up doing it pretty much exactly how we'd imagined it in the first place. Six months, three studios and eighty attempts. We got there in the end." – Mat Osman, bassist

"It happens quite often that you go on a journey, attempt various things and end up preferring the first thing you did," agreed producer Steve Osborne. "'Fashion' was a song that we started in the first week of recording -- but we didn't finish it until the very last week!"

== Release and promotion ==
The band played the song live for the first time on TFI Friday on 4 June 1999. The single was released on 21 June 1999 and peaking at number 13 on the UK Singles Chart, thus breaking a run of six consecutive top-10 singles stretching back to "Trash" in August 1996. It slid quickly out the charts, only spending six weeks in the top 100. It was also the group's last top-10 hit in Finland; a country where the singles from Coming Up had performed very well. Although it did not make the UK top 10, it received the most commercial airplay from Suede's discography. Saul Galpern of Nude Records said that "She's in Fashion" was Suede's biggest radio hit. However this exposure on the airwaves failed to transfer into sales and Galpern felt perhaps it should have been the first single.

The single amassed unprecedented airplay for a hitherto indie band. Radio One and Atlantic 252, both played it 22 times the week before its release date. Zoe Ball, then presenting Radio 1 Breakfast, made it her Single of the Week, possibly associating with the song’s opening lyrics: "She's the face on the radio, she's the body on the morning show." Lead singer Brett Anderson said: "It did open us up to a mainstream that we hadn't been open to before [...] 'She's in Fashion' is probably our most famous song in a funny sort of way."

== Critical reception ==
The song was well-received by critics, who welcomed the song's summery sound. Select declared it 'Single of the Month', writing: "Like 'Electricity' before it, 'She's in Fashion' is gloriously shallow pop music. With a keyboard figure from a Tunisian tourist-board ad, it’s about as summery as getting pissed at the fairground." James Oldham of NME liked the music, saying: "Soused in acoustic guitar'd empathy, with a vaporous keyboard motif inescapably reminiscent of Duran Duran's 'Save a Prayer', 'She's in Fashion' is a balmy, barmy beaut, shimmering grooves turning a blithe eye to the world." Music Week said it was "classic Suede – one of their best songs since 'Animal Nitrate' [...] It's a string-swept, breezy, car-roof-down-driving-around-the-French-Riviera number." Neil Davenport from Manchester Evening News called it the "standout track" on the album, and felt that it sounded nothing like the "over-familiar Suede". He added: "'She's in Fashion' Bjork-style string arrangements to a blue sky of pop possibility. For all its light surfaces, this is maddeningly memorable."

In a more mixed assessment, Amber Cowan of The Times spoke favourably of the song's production, while criticising Anderson's lyrics, saying "it coasts along breezily on a wave of strings and synths that owe more than a passing nod to the Eighties electronica of bands such as the Human League. The feelgood, hands-in-the-air chorus is refreshingly upbeat after the tinny jangle of their last album, Coming Up, and the deliciously summery fade-out also scores extra brownie points. The only drawback, predictably, is Brett Anderson's unintentionally hilarious lyrics, full of the same tired old Suede reference points." Music writer James Masterton said that "She's in Fashion" sees the band "switch direction once more to the kind of string-laden epic ballad that cropped up on their earlier work. It isn't quite the masterpiece some reviewers have made it out to be but there is no doubt that it is the work of a band still at the height of their creativity."

== Music video ==
The video for the title song was directed by Johan Renck, and features Anderson riding in a car, focusing on a woman who re-appears outside in a different setting with different clothing. She is seen throwing out her garbage, taking her dog for a walk, standing among a flower field, sitting on a tree. She appears eleven times in different clothing. At the end of the video, Anderson turns his head to his right, and the girl is sitting next to him in the back seat. The video was filmed on the route from Eastbourne to London.

== Track listings ==
UK CD1

1. "She's in Fashion" (Brett Anderson, Neil Codling)
2. "Bored" (Anderson, Richard Oakes)
3. "Pieces of My Mind" (Anderson)

UK CD2

1. "She's in Fashion" (Anderson, Codling)
2. "Jubilee" (Anderson, Codling)
3. "God's Gift" (Anderson)

UK cassette single

1. "She's in Fashion" (Anderson, Codling)
2. "Down" (demo) (Anderson, Oakes)

European CD single

1. "She's in Fashion" (radio edit) (Anderson, Codling)
2. "God's Gift" (Anderson)

Japanese CD single

1. "She's in Fashion" (Anderson, Codling) – 4:53
2. "Bored" (Anderson, Oakes) – 3:03
3. "Pieces of My Mind" (Anderson) – 4:42
4. "Jubilee" (Anderson, Codling) – 3:49
5. "God's Gift" (Anderson) – 3:03

== Charts ==
Chart (1999)	Peak position
Europe (Eurochart Hot 100)	47
Finland (Suomen virallinen lista)	10
Scotland Singles (OCC)	15
Sweden (Sverigetopplistan)	59
UK Singles (OCC)	13
UK Indie (OCC)	2

== Release history ==
Region	Date	Format(s)	Label(s)	Ref.
United Kingdom	21 June 1999	CD; cassette	Nude	
Japan	21 August 1999	CD	Nude	
