= The Departure =

English rock band

- Origin: Northampton, England
- Genres: Indie rock
- Years active: 2004-2008
- Label: Parlophone
- Past members: Ben Winton; Sam Harvey; Lee Irons; Andy Hobson; David Maddox-Jones; Simon Alexander

The Departure was an English rock band from Northampton, formed in October 2003. Their debut album, Dirty Words, was released 13 June 2005 by Parlophone. A second album, Inventions, was expected to be released in early 2008, but was not (due to issues with the band's record label, Parlophone). The band split up on 30 January 2008.

== History ==
The group formed in January 2004 after starting in Northampton as a collaboration between a former Christian commune member David Jones (vocals/guitar) and his friend Sam Harvey. After recruiting old school associate Ben Winton (bass) and Lee Irons (guitar), the lineup was completed with the addition of Andy Hobson (drums) via a musician's ad website. Jones described the concept of the band to music webzine Drowned in Sound: "We all got quite excited about the whole ethos of what we’re trying to do, which is to take 1980s reference points and transcend them into modern day, edgy, instant kind of sounds."

They were signed to Parlophone after playing only three gigs and being together for just four months, a fact that attracted a considerable level of derision and scepticism. Touring slots with The Killers, Feeder, Duran Duran, Placebo, supporting them at Wembley Arena, The Tears and a reformed Gang Of Four soon followed as the band sought to build a support base ahead of their first wing of releases. Debut single "All Mapped Out" was released on 2 August 2004 and debuted at number 30 on the UK singles chart. The track was included on the soundtrack to Driver: Parallel Lines. Follow-up single "Be My Enemy" emerged on 18 October 2004 and was included on the soundtrack to FIFA 06.

They released a debut album Dirty Words, produced by Steve Osborne (who also worked with New Order, Suede and Happy Mondays), a year after signing to Parlophone at Realworld Studios in Bath. The album was trailed the week before its release by the reissue of the "All Mapped Out" single. Disappointingly it was lower in the charts than the original. The album drew a middling response from critics, who varied between praising the album for its bleak, futuristic atmosphere and slating it for its perceived superficiality and over-reliance on the music of the 1980s for inspiration.

A UK tour and festival appearances followed soon after. In early 2006, Lee Irons had left the band citing artistic differences. Andy Hobson left later that year and was replaced by the original drummer, Simon Alexander. The four-piece began work on the follow-up to Dirty Words in Grouse Lodge Studios, Ireland which was expected to release in 2007. On 30 January 2008 the band announced that they had split up after being dropped by Parlophone.

In 2010, David Jones formed a new band called NewIslands who released a single called "Out of Time" (an album was announced but not released), while later in the decade he formed a duo called Born Stranger, which had become a solo project by 2018. In 2020, he released a solo single called "Headspace" under the name Maddox Jones.

== Discography ==
=== Albums ===
- Dirty Words UK #91
- Inventions (Unreleased)

=== EPs ===
- Lump In My Throat which included; Lump In My throat, Under The Stairs, The City Blurs In Your Eyes, Lump In My Throat (James Ford remix) and Be My Enemy live at Lamcq.
- All Mapped Out which included; All Mapped Out, Blackout and All Mapped Out (¥£$ remix).
- Arms Around Me which featured different versions of their song Arms Around Me.

=== Singles ===
Release date	Title	Album	UK
2 August 2004	"All Mapped Out"	Dirty Words	30
18 October 2004	"Be My Enemy"	Dirty Words	41
4 April 2005	"Lump In My Throat"	Dirty Words	30
6 June 2005	"All Mapped Out" (re-release)	Dirty Words	33
17 October 2005	"Arms Around Me"	Dirty Words	-
3 September 2007	"7 Years"	Inventions	-
