= Love Is Dead (song) =

"Love is Dead"

Single by Brett Anderson

from the album Brett Anderson
- Released: 19 March 2007
- Recorded: 2005–2006
- Genre: Indie rock
- Length: 3:35
- Label: Drowned in Sound
- Songwriters: Brett Anderson; Fred Ball

Brett Anderson singles chronology
"Love is Dead" (2007)	"Back to You" (2007)

"Love Is Dead" is the debut solo single by Brett Anderson from his self-titled debut solo album. It was released on two CD singles and 7" vinyl. A download bundle was also available. The sleeve was designed by Peter Saville, with photography by Wolfgang Tillmans. The music video was directed by Russell Thomas.

The single reached number 42 on the UK Singles Chart. It was well received by critics. Dom Gourlay of Contactmusic.com wrote: "As a precursor for his self-titled album, 'Love Is Dead' is pretty much what you'd expect it to be - lavish, grandiose, elegant and distinctive." He felt that vocally, Anderson sounded more "mature" and that the song was more memorable than any of his recent work with The Tears. He added: "The string section gives it an added edge, somewhat surprisingly, while the hookline isn't a million miles away from the coda of one of his initial employers' biggest hits, 'Stay Together'."

Rick Futon of the Daily Record said it was "one of the best songs Brett Anderson has ever written." He noted: "Aching violins push this mid-tempo rocker into the realms of a classic." NME considered the song "rather decent."

== Track listings ==
CD1

1. "Love Is Dead" – 3:35
2. "Clowns" – 3:39

CD2

1. "Love Is Dead" – 3:35
2. "We Can Be Anyone" – 3:37
3. "Mother Night" – 2:50

7"

1. "Love Is Dead"
2. "Elegant"

Download

1. "Love Is Dead" – 3:35
2. "Clowns" – 3:39
3. "We Can Be Anyone" – 3:37
4. "Mother Night" – 2:50
5. "Elegant"
6. "Love Is Dead" (Live at Bush Hall) – 3:34
7. "Clowns" (Live at Bush Hall) – 3:39
