= Brett Anderson =

English singer (born 1967)

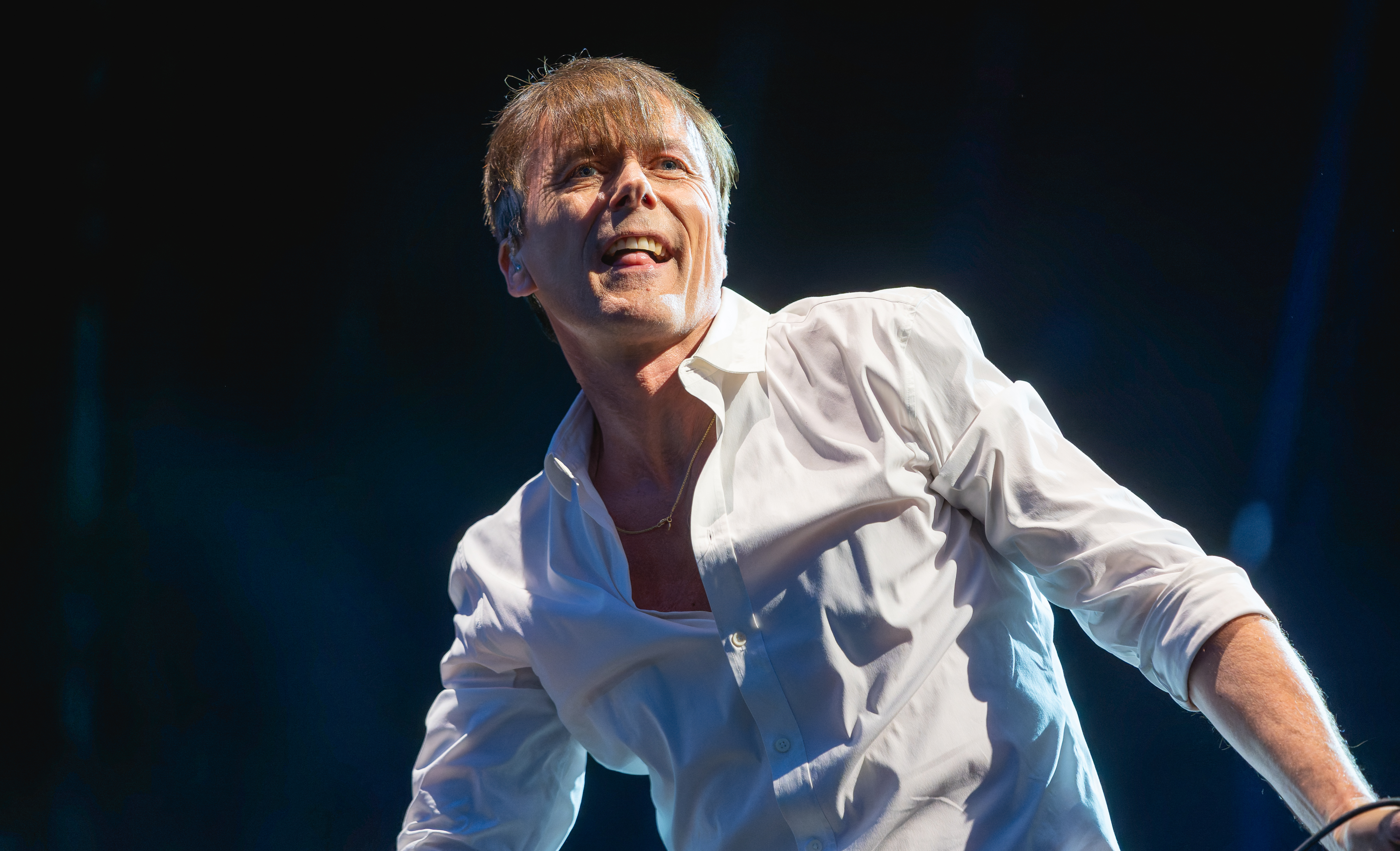
- Anderson on stage with Suede in Audley End, 2024

Background information
- Born: Brett Lewis Anderson; 29 September 1967 (age 59); Lindfield, Sussex, England
- Genres: Alternative rock; indie rock; glam rock; art rock; Britpop
- Occupations: Singer; songwriter
- Instruments: Vocals; guitar; keyboards; percussion
- Years active: 1989–present
- Labels: Drowned in Sound; B A Songs
- Member of: Suede
- Formerly of: The Tears
- Spouse: Jodie

Brett Lewis Anderson (born 29 September 1967) is an English singer best known as the lead singer-songwriter and primary lyricist of the rock band Suede. After Suede disbanded in 2003, he fronted the Tears with former Suede guitarist Bernard Butler in 2004–2006, and released four solo albums on which he also played guitar and keyboards. Suede re-formed in 2010; they continue to record and tour. He is noted for his distinctive wide-ranging voice, poetic lyrics, charismatic stage presence and in Suede's early years, an androgynous appearance.

== Early years ==
Anderson was born and grew up in Lindfield, Sussex, a village two miles (3 km) north-east of Haywards Heath. His mother was an artist and a dressmaker; his father was a taxi driver whom Anderson described as an "obsessive classical-music fan". He attended Lindfield Junior School, Oathall Comprehensive School, and Haywards Heath Sixth-Form College. In 1986 he gained A-levels in Maths, Physics and Chemistry.

In his teens Anderson played guitar for garage bands such as the Pigs and Geoff, the latter featuring future Suede bassist Mat Osman. In the late 1980s, while a student at the Bartlett School of Architecture, University College London, Anderson and Osman formed Suede with Anderson's girlfriend, Justine Frischmann, and soon recruited guitarist Bernard Butler through an advertisement in NME. After they had received temporary help from former Smiths drummer Mike Joyce, in 1991 Simon Gilbert joined as their permanent drummer. Around this time Frischmann left Anderson for Blur frontman Damon Albarn, which created an early rift in the burgeoning Britpop scene of the early 1990s. After missing too many rehearsals and flaunting her relationship with Albarn while still living with Anderson, Frischmann left the band, going on to front Elastica.

== Suede (1989–2003; 2010–present) ==
Even before Suede's first album appeared in stores, Anderson's androgynous style and vague "confessions" about his sexuality stirred controversy in the British music press. His infamous comment that he was "a bisexual man who never had a homosexual experience" was indicative of how he both courted controversy and a sexually ambiguous, alienated audience. In 1993, Suede hit number one on the UK charts. Combining Morrissey's homoerotic posturing with David Bowie's glam theatrics, Anderson achieved rapid fame in the UK, though not in the US. Due to a trademark dispute with the American lounge singer Suede, the band were forced to change their name to The London Suede for the American market. Though songwriting partner Butler left in 1994 during the recording of second album Dog Man Star, the band continued to release critically and increasingly commercially successful material in the UK, Europe and Asia, such as 1996's Coming Up (another number one for the band). The band went on to release Head Music (number one on the UK charts and in several countries) in 1999, but A New Morning was a commercial disappointment in 2002. In 2003, following the release of their "Singles" collection, Suede disbanded.

Anderson commented that the history of Suede is "ridiculous. It's like Machiavelli rewriting Fear and Loathing in Las Vegas. It involves a cast of thousands. It should star Charlton Heston... it's like a pram that's just been pushed down a hill. It's always been fiery and tempestuous and really on the edge and it never stops. I don't think it ever will." As a solo musician during Suede's career, Anderson collaborated with Stina Nordenstam and his guest vocals can be heard on the album This Is Stina Nordenstam. He also sang a duet with Jane Birkin in 1995 which appeared in 1998 on Birkin's "best of" album. In addition he sang the lyric "You're going to reap just what you sow" for the Children in Need charity single "Perfect Day".

Following persistent rumours, the boss of the band's former label, Nude Records' Saul Galpern, confirmed to the NME that Suede would be playing together again. "It's [for] a one-off gig," he explained of the show, which featured the band's second incarnation. The band played London's Royal Albert Hall as part of the 2010 Teenage Cancer Trust shows. The band performed warm-up shows at the 100 Club in London and Ritz Ballroom in Manchester, and the success of the shows led to a European tour in the summer of 2010. Further festival dates occurred in 2011, along with UK dates where Suede performed their first three albums in full.

== The Tears (2004–2005) ==
In 2004, Anderson and former Suede guitarist Bernard Butler briefly formed the band the Tears with Will Foster, Makoto Sakamoto and Nathan Fisher and released their debut album Here Come the Tears, which was met with generally favourable reviews. It was produced by Butler, recorded at 2 kHz Studios and Rak Studios (London) as well as at Butler's home studio ("Bernie's Buttons"), and featured the singles "Refugees" and "Lovers". Following the cancellation of a European tour in support of the album, the band were dropped by Independiente and the project was abandoned.

== Solo work (2006–present) ==
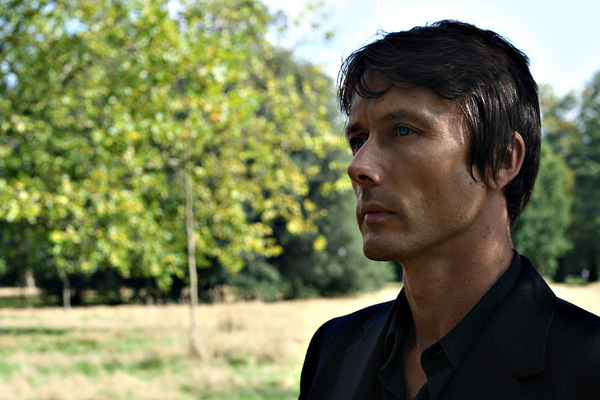
Brett Anderson in Hyde Park in 2008

In May 2006, Anderson announced details of a solo album consisting of 11 tracks, which was released on 26 March 2007. He told NME that the title would be Brett Anderson since "...that's my name, you see." The accompanying video for Anderson's first single "Love Is Dead" debuted on UK television in February 2007, quickly finding its way to YouTube. "Love Is Dead" made its debut at No. 42 in the UK singles chart, and the album went to No. 54 the following week. The keyboardist-producer on his album is Fred Ball, and former Suede bass player Mat Osman joined the live band on tour.

In July 2007 Anderson modelled Nick Hart for Aquascutum's autumn/winter 2007 campaign

In May 2008 it was announced that Anderson's second album was to be premiered on 7 July in a special concert at London's Mermaid Theatre. A copy of the album, entitled Wilderness, was distributed to all ticket buyers, in the form of a USB stick. The album was recorded in only seven days, with most tracks recorded as live takes. He plays the piano and the acoustic guitars, and is accompanied by Amy Langley on cello. One of the songs "Back to You" written with Fred Ball of the Norwegian band Pleasure is a duet with French actress Emmanuelle Seigner. After this album's release, Anderson released his solo album through his own independent label, BA Songs.

Anderson's third album, Slow Attack was co-written with Leo Abrahams. On his website, Brett Anderson writes that he tried to use words in a different way, as fragments, and hint of meanings and emotions. The music is more orchestral than Wilderness with more instrumentation throughout the album. On tour, he was joined by Jim Dare [Minuteman], Didz Hammond (Dirty Pretty Things), Angie Pollock (Goldfrapp), Sebastian Sternberg (Pleasure, Marina and the Diamonds), Kris Sonne and Amy Langley, thus giving the songs a more art-rock edge.

Black Rainbows – Anderson's fourth solo album was released through BA Songs, distributed by EMI Music Service in September 2011. It was preceded by the single "Brittle Heart". It was the second album Anderson had co-written with Leo Abrahams and it saw a return to a simpler more commercial rock format. Anderson stated that he had taken as reference points some of his old favourite records like PIL's "Rise", and Siouxsie and the Banshees' Juju while conceiving the songs.

== Personal life ==
In the early days of Suede's career, Anderson made a comment that he was "a bisexual man who never had a homosexual experience."

The recording of Suede's Head Music was plagued with difficulties such as Anderson's addiction to heroin and crack cocaine which showed in his increasingly unpredictable behaviour and gaunt appearance, which contrasted with his previously healthy and androgynous appearance. While Anderson had been taking drugs moderately during Suede's career up to that point, he was addicted for two and a half years, but stopped in late 1999, when somebody very close to him became ill. He has been clean since. Speaking of his addiction, Anderson said, "Anyone who has ever tried crack will know exactly why I took it. It's the scariest drug in the world because the hit you get from it is so, so seductive. I wanted to experience that, and I did – repeatedly."

Anderson is married to Jodie, a naturopath, with whom he has a step-son and son.

In 2018, Anderson released an autobiography titled Coal Black Mornings. A second book, called Afternoons With The Blinds Drawn was released a year later.

== Solo discography ==
=== Studio albums ===
Album	Peak chart positions		
Album	UK	UK Indie	Japan
Brett Anderson: Released: 26 March 2007; Label: Drowned in Sound	54	—	165
Wilderness: Released: 1 September 2008; Label: B A Songs	161	16	275
Slow Attack: Released: 2 November 2009; Label: B A Songs	174	—	212
Black Rainbows: Released: 26 September 2011; Label: B A Songs / EMI Music Services	103	—	200
"—" denotes a release that did not chart or was not released

=== Live albums ===
- Live in London (9 May 2007) (Limited Edition of 1500)
- Live at Union Chapel (19 July 2007) (Limited Edition of 1500)
- Live at Queen Elizabeth Hall (20 October 2007) (Limited Edition of 1500)
- The London Sessions (Double vinyl compilation of three of Brett Anderson 2007 concerts) (Limited Edition of 1000)
- Tour 2010: Berlin (1 February 2010) (USB Stick)
- Live at Koko (12 October 2011)

=== Singles and EPs ===
- "Love Is Dead" (19 March 2007) – (UK No. 42)
- "Back to You" (EP) (9 July 2007) (non-chart eligible)
- "A Different Place" (21 July 2008) (digital download)
- "The Hunted" (22 November 2009) (digital download)
- "Brittle Heart" (15 August 2011) (digital download)
- "Crash About to Happen" (27 November 2011) (digital download)
