= Steve Osborne =

British record producer (born 1963)

Stephen John "Steve" Osborne (born 1963) is a British record producer, living in Bath, England. He has worked with a wide variety of musicians, including Suede, the B-52s, A-ha, New Order, Elbow, U2, Happy Mondays, Placebo, Gregory Porter, Doves, KT Tunstall, Vanessa Carlton, Simple Minds and Peter Gabriel.

== Career ==
During the 1990s, Osborne was half of the Perfecto Records team, a production and remix collaboration with Paul Oakenfold; they worked with Happy Mondays, U2, and other artists. He and Oakenfold were part of the 1990s dance music act Grace which existed from 1994 to 1997.

Osborne worked with Cat's Eyes on their critically acclaimed album, released in April 2011. At the 2012 Soundedit Festival in Poland, Osborne received the prestigious 'The Man with the Golden Ear' Award.

In 2000 as part of Perfecto, Osborne was replaced by Andy Gray who went on to remix Moby's "Natural Blues", U2's "Beautiful Day", and compose the music for Big Brother UK with Oakenfold under the name Elementfour.

== Production and mixing credits ==
- 2016: A-ha – Producer & Mixer – "Objects in the Mirror" (single)
- 2016: A-ha – Producer & Mixer – "Cast in Steel" (single)
- 2015: Young Guns = Producer & Mixer – Ones and Zeros
- 2014: Vanessa Carlton = Producer & Mixer – Liberman
- 2014: Charlie Simpson = Producer & Mixer – Long Road Home
- 2014: Simple Minds = Producer & Mixer – Big Music
- 2012: Invaders = Producer & Mixer – "Hummingbird"
- 2012: Charlie Simpson = Producer & Mixer – "Farmer & His Gun"
- 2012: Urusen = Producer & Mixer – This Is Where We Meet
- 2012: Morten Harket – Producer & Mixer – Out of My Hands
- 2011: Vanessa Carlton – Producer & Mixer – Rabbits on the Run
- 2010: Cat's Eyes – Producer & Mixer – Cat's Eyes
- 2010: A-ha – Producer & Mixer – "Butterfly, Butterfly (The Last Hurrah)" (single)
- 2009: A-ha – Producer & Mixer – Foot of the Mountain (single)
- 2009: A-ha – Producer & Mixer – "Nothing Is Keeping You Here" (single)
- 2008: Starsailor – Producer & Mixer – All the Plans
- 2008: The Twang – Producer & Mixer – "Ice Cream Sunday"
- 2008: The B-52's – Producer & Mixer – Funplex
- 2007: KT Tunstall – Producer – Drastic Fantastic
- 2006: KT Tunstall – Producer & Mixer – KT Tunstall's Acoustic Extravaganza
- 2006: Union of Knives - Producer & Mixer - Violence and Birdsong
- 2006: Grace – Producer & Mixer – Debut
- 2006: The Fratellis – Mixer – Costello Music
- 2006: Young Love – Producer – Too Young to Fight It
- 2006: Brookville – Producer – Life in the Shade
- 2006: Clearlake – Producer & Mixer – Amber
- 2005: Thrice – Producer & Mixer – Vheissu
- 2005: Ivy – Producer & Mixer – In The Clear
- 2005: The Departure – Producer & Mixer – Dirty Words
- 2005: Colour of Fire – Producer & Mixer – Pearl Necklace
- 2005: Syntax – Producer & Mixer – Meccano Mind
- 2004: KT Tunstall – Producer & Mixer – Eye to the Telescope
- 2004: Chikinki – Producer & Mixer – Lick Your Ticket
- 2004: Longview – Producer & Mixer – "Nowhere", "Sleep" and "Still"
- 2004: Magnet – Producer & Mixer – Chasing Dreams (EP)
- 2005: Aqualung – Remixer – "Strange and Beautiful"
- 2003: The Leaves – Assistant Producer & Mixer – "Breathe"
- 2003: Lamb – Producer – "Between Darkness and Wonder"
- 2003: Peter Gabriel – Remixer – The Tower
- 2002: Peter Gabriel – Assistant Producer & Mixer – Up
- 2002: Doves – Producer & Mixer – The Last Broadcast
- 2001: New Order – Producer & Mixer – Get Ready
- 2001: Sophie Ellis-Bextor – Producer & Mixer – "Music Gets the Best of Me"
- 2000: Doves – Producer & Mixer – Lost Souls
- 2000: Elbow – Producer & Mixer – Asleep in the Back
- 2000: Starsailor – Producer & Mixer – Love Is Here
- 1999: Suede – Producer & Mixer – Head Music
- 1999: Suede – Producer & Mixer – "Electricity"
- 1999: Suede – Producer & Mixer – "She's in Fashion"
- 1998: Placebo – Producer & Mixer – Without You I'm Nothing
- 1997: Headswim – Producer & Mixer – Despite Yourself
- 1997: U2 − Staring at the Sun single − Additional production
- 1997: U2 – Producer Pop
- 1997: Curve – Producer & Mixer – "Chinese Burn" and "Coming Up Roses"
- 1996: Lush – Producer & Mixer – Lovelife
- 1994: Scorpio Rising – Producer & Mixer – Brutal Deluxe (album)
- 1993: Deacon Blue – Producer & Mixer – Whatever You Say, Say Nothing
- 1992: U2 − Remixer – "Even Better Than the Real Thing" (Remixes) (remix single)
- 1990: Happy Mondays – Producer & Mixer – Pills 'n' Thrills and Bellyaches
