= Live at O2 Shepherds Bush Empire =

Live album by KT Tunstall
- Released: 10 November 2016
- Recorded: 9 November 2016
- Venue: Shepherd's Bush Empire (London)
- Genre: Pop, alternative rock
- Length: 118:24
- Label: Live Here Now

KT Tunstall chronology
Kin (2016)	Live at O2 Shepherds Bush Empire (2016)	KT Tunstall's Acoustic Extravaganza 2 (2017)

Live at O2 Shepherds Bush Empire is KT Tunstall's sixth live album, recorded on 9 November 2016. It features many tracks from her previous albums, with the second half of the double album containing many tracks from her 2016 release KIN. Tunstall was accompanied by a three-piece band consisting of Rachel Eckroth on keyboard, Solomon Dorsey on bass, and Denny Weston Jr. on drums.

== Release ==
The album was recorded and mixed by Max Butcher for Live Here Now. Fans were able to purchase the CD at the show and pick it up directly after the show finished. The CD was at one point available through KT Tunstall's PledgeMusic store.

== Track listing ==
=== Disc One ===
All tracks are written by KT Tunstall, except where noted

No.	Title	Writer(s)	Original album	Length
1.	"If Only"	Tunstall, Jimmy Hogarth	Drastic Fantastic	7:00
2.	"Little Favours"		Drastic Fantastic	5:03
3.	"Funnyman"	Tunstall, Martin Terefe	Drastic Fantastic	4:33
4.	"(Still a) Weirdo"	Tunstall, Greg Kurstin	Tiger Suit	6:12
5.	"Maybe It's a Good Thing"		KIN	5:13
6.	"Evil Eye"		KIN	3:45
7.	"Other Side of the World"	Tunstall, Terefe	Eye to the Telescope	8:27
8.	"Hold On"	Tunstall, Ed Case	Drastic Fantastic	5:43
9.	"Run on Home"		KIN	5:06
10.	"Invisible Empire"		Invisible Empire // Crescent Moon	6:15
Total length:				57:17

=== Disc Two ===
All tracks are written by KT Tunstall, except where noted

No.	Title	Writer(s)	Original album	Length
1.	"Black Horse and the Cherry Tree"		Eye to the Telescope	10:46
2.	"It Took Me So Long to Get Here, But Here I Am"		KIN	5:59
3.	"KIN"		KIN	6:21
4.	"Two Way" (Duet vocals by Solomon Dorsey)	KT Tunstall, James Bay	KIN	5:58
5.	"Hard Girls"		KIN	3:59
6.	"Saving My Face"		Drastic Fantastic	6:06
7.	"Fade Like a Shadow"		Tiger Suit	4:00
8.	"Everything Has Its Shape"		KIN	6:56
9.	"The Healer"		Golden State EP	4:57
10.	"Suddenly I See"		Eye to the Telescope	6:05
Total length:				1:01:07
