= Extra Wax =

2019 album by KT Tunstall

EP by KT Tunstall
- Released: 13 April 2019
- Recorded: 2017–2018
- Length: 8:55
- Label: Rostrum

KT Tunstall chronology
Live at the Barrowland Ballroom Glasgow 2019 (2019)	Extra Wax (2019)	Nut (2022)

Extra Wax (Wax stylised in all caps) is a limited-edition 7-inch vinyl EP by Scottish singer-songwriter KT Tunstall as a supplement to her sixth studio album, WAX. It was released on 13 April 2019. The record contains two new non-album tracks, "John the Conqueror" and "Throw Down Boy", and a cover of Violent Femmes' "Blister in the Sun".

== Background ==
On March 1, 2019, Tunstall announced on Instagram a special version of her latest album, WAX, which was first released on 5 October 2018. This special release included new tracks, but it was limited to only 1,000 copies. The EP was released in conjunction with the independent record store event Record Store Day on 13 April 2019.

Both "Throw Down Boy" and "John the Conqueror" had been bonus tracks that were originally only available for purchase in Scotland. "John the Conqueror" was written during the Tiger Suit sessions. The "Blister in the Sun" cover is new.

== Track listing ==
No.	Title	Writer(s)	Producer(s)	Length
1.	"John the Conqueror"	Tunstall; Greg Kurstin	Nick McCarthy; Sebastian Kellig	2:51
2.	"Throw Down Boy"	Tunstall; McCarthy; Kellig	McCarthy; Kellig	3:07
3.	"Blister in the Sun"	Gordon Gano	Tunstall	2:46
