= All or Nothing (KT Tunstall song) =

Song by KT Tunstall

from the album Golden State EP
- Released: 16 June 2016
- Recorded: 2015–16
- Genre: Pop
- Length: 3:36 (album version); 3:49 (radio edit)
- Label: Caroline, Sony/ATV Music
- Songwriter: KT Tunstall
- Producer: Tony Hoffer

"All or Nothing" is a song by the Scottish recording artist KT Tunstall. It was released as part of her Golden State EP along with the songs "Evil Eye", "The Healer", and a remix of "Evil Eye". It was released digitally through iTunes on 16 June 2016.

The song was produced by Tony Hoffer. A music video was released on 29 June 2016 on her Vevo page.

== Composition ==
The song has been fairly prominent in France because Tunstall had written it for the French TV Show Sam, starring Mathilde Seigner. "All or Nothing" is the theme song, and a recurrent song in the series. The series deals with a controversial junior high school teacher in France. It also featured the TC show Tennis: Eastbourne.

While the song became popular, it was never released until the Golden State EP. Tunstall said in an interview that she had started writing new material for films before her sixth studio album KIN, and she realized among all of these songs that she had written "great pop songs". "All or Nothing" is not included on the track list for KIN.

== Music video ==
A music video was shot for "All or Nothing", showing Tunstall jumping in slow motion with a guitar in her hand. The background is made of glitters flying in the air. The video is available on her Vevo page. The video makes no reference of the TV show she was written for.

As of August, the video made for the audio of the song has been seen over 100,000 times. The same kind of video was made for the track "The Healer", also part of the Golden State EP.

== Track listing ==
Digital download, CD
No.	Title	Writer(s)	Producer(s)	Length
1.	"All or Nothing"	KT Tunstall	Tony Hoffer	3:36
Total length:				3:34
