= Nut (album) =

Studio album by KT Tunstall
- Released: 9 September 2022
- Recorded: 2020–2022
- Studio: Eastcore (London); Lint (London); Hoxa HQ (London); The Melissa Etheridge Cruise; Kensaltown East (New York)
- Genre: Pop rock
- Length: 33:45
- Label: EMI
- Producer: Martin Terefe; Jimmy Hogarth; KT Tunstall; Jordan Brooke Hamlin; Sophie Ellis

KT Tunstall chronology
Extra Wax (2019)	Nut (2022)	Face to Face (2023)

Singles from Nut
- 1. "Canyons" Released: 1 June 2022; 2. "I Am the Pilot" Released: 8 July 2022; 3. "Private Eyes" Released: 29 July 2022

Nut is the seventh studio album by the Scottish singer-songwriter KT Tunstall, and the third and final album in the "soul, body and mind" trilogy. It was released on 9 September 2022, following the first two albums of the trilogy, Kin (2016) and Wax (2018). The first songs released from the album were titled "Canyons", "I Am the Pilot" and the lead single called "Private Eyes".

== Background ==
Tunstall announced the release of Nut on 28 May 2022, completing her trilogy of albums ("soul, body and mind"), with Nut being about the mind. Tunstall started working on the record during the 2020 COVID-19 pandemic lockdown, alongside writing music for a musical.

The album was written and recorded during a profound period of change for Tunstall, including hearing loss, heightened self-awareness, love and a global pandemic.

The album artwork was created by Josh McCartney. Tunstall talked about the album name "nut", as a word that refers to mind or brain in Scottish slang. She elaborated, "I love that the word also means a seed – the album artwork is all about the brain being a garden; you reap what you sow, you need to keep the weeds at bay, and there is an almost supernatural beauty to when things blossom".

Tunstall released three singles from the album prior to its release: "Canyons", "I Am the Pilot" and the lead single "Private Eyes" – which is a song tackling a true story "of a starlet lost in her own fame, and my getting a glimpse of her gilded prison..." She released a music video for each single.

Tunstall announced her first UK tour (since the pandemic) promoting the album—including shows in York, Manchester, London, Edinburgh and Glasgow.

== Critical reception ==
Neil Z. Yeung of AllMusic cited two of the singles, "I Am the Pilot" and "Canyons" as highlights, as well as the album opener "Out of Touch" and "Synapse".

John Apice from American Highways described Tunstall's vocals as "sumptuous" and mentioned the songs "tease with danceable energy & keep the commercial silliness in check". His highlights include "Dear Shadow", "Demigod" and "All the Time".

== Track listing ==
All tracks produced by Martin Terefe, except where noted.

Nut track listing
No.	Title	Writer(s)	Producer(s)	Length
1.	"Out of Touch"	KT Tunstall; Jimmy Hogarth; Kevin Cormack; Johnny Lynch	Martin Terefe; Hogarth	3:36
2.	"I Am the Pilot"	Tunstall; Cathy Dennis; Terefe		4:13
3.	"Three"	Tunstall; Matty Benbrook		4:08
4.	"Dear Shadow"	Tunstall; Dennis		2:50
5.	"Private Eyes"	Tunstall; Tommy Danvers		4:20
6.	"Canyons"	Tunstall; Terefe		3:24
7.	"Synapse"	Tunstall		3:01
8.	"Demigod"	Tunstall; Greg Kurstin		3:29
9.	"All the Time"	Tunstall	Terefe; Tunstall; Jordan Brooke Hamlin	3:28
10.	"Brain in a Jar" (hidden track)	Tunstall; Terefe	Terefe; Tunstall; Sophie Ellis	1:16
Total length:				33:45

== Personnel ==
- KT Tunstall – vocals (all tracks), acoustic guitar (tracks 1–5, 7–9), bass guitar (1), synthesizer (2, 7, 8), programming (2), electric guitar (5, 6)
- Martin Terefe – bass guitar (1–8), electric guitar (1, 2, 4–8), acoustic guitar (1, 3–6), synthesizer (2, 4, 7), piano (2, 4, 9), percussion (2, 5, 6), backing vocals (2), vocoder (6), keyboards (7, 8), Mellotron (7)
- Kevin Cormack – bass guitar, keyboards, synthesizer solo (1)
- Jimmy Hogarth – electric guitar, percussion, programming, synthesizer (1)
- Nikolaj Torp Larsen – PCM synthesizer (1), synthesizer (3, 5, 6, 8); keyboards, sequencer drums (3); piano (5, 6)
- George Murphy – programming (1, 2, 4–6, 8), electric guitar (1, 8), percussion (2, 8); backing vocals, piano (8)
- Andy Burrows – drums, percussion (1, 4–8)
- Johnny Lynch – drums (1)
- Liam Howe – programming (6, 7)
- Clem Cherry – programming (7)
- Oliver Roman – acoustic guitar (9)
- Solomon Dorsey – bass (9)

Technical

- Dyre Gormsen – mastering
- Martin Terefe – mixing, recording
- George Murphy – recording
- Clem Cherry – recording
- Jordan Brooke Hamlin – recording (9)
- Oliver Liu – mixing assistance
- Liam Howe – additional recording (1, 4–8)
- Jimmy Hogarth – additional recording (1)

Visuals

- Josh McCartney – art direction
- Piper Ferguson – photography
- Andrew Whitton – photography
- Cortney Armitage – photography
- Muhr Design – layout

== Charts ==
Weekly chart performance for Nut
Chart (2022)	Peak position
Scottish Albums (OCC)	4
UK Album Downloads (OCC)	25
UK Albums (OCC)	25
UK Physical Albums (OCC)	5
UK Vinyl Albums (OCC)	11
