= Face to Face (Suzi Quatro and KT Tunstall album) =

Studio album by Suzi Quatro and KT Tunstall
- Released: 11 August 2023
- Length: 32:00
- Label: Sun
- Producer: LR Tuckey

Suzi Quatro chronology
The Devil in Me (2021)	Face to Face (2023)

KT Tunstall chronology
Nut (2022)	Face to Face (2023)

Face to Face is a collaborative album by American musician Suzi Quatro and Scottish musician KT Tunstall, released on 11 August 2023 via Sun Records. The album features original duets recorded by both artists, and was recorded by both Quatro and Tunstall together in England, with the album produced by Quatro's son, LR Tuckey.

== Background ==
Quatro and Tunstall first met in 2010 following an Elvis Presley tribute concert at Hyde Park in London. Tunstall acknowledged that she had long been a fan of Quatro, claiming she was the first woman in "rock and roll", and that her second studio album Drastic Fantastic (2007) was "definitely a nod to her". Quatro said that she "was a fan of KT from the first hit — liked her voice, her songwriting and her musicianship". Speaking about the work and recording around the album, Quatro said that "we [Quatro and Tunstall] are indeed cut from the same cloth which is where our artistry met and flourished. A match made in heaven".

Tunstall has spoken in admiration for the friendship both she and Quatro have, as well as speaking fondly about the writing process that eventually led to Face to Face. Tunstall claimed that both Quatro and she "talked more than we wrote", and working in Quatro's home during the writing sessions for the album consisted of "sitting on the floor bare foot". Quatro said that despite Tunstall's claimed of excessive talking between the pair, it was unknown to them that "actually we were, in our heads, creating a song".

== Recording ==
The earliest known plans for a collaborative album by Quatro and Tunstall were first discussed in 2018. However, the plans stalled and both musicians continued on with their respective solo work. Tunstall had just released her sixth studio album Wax, whilst Quatro released her No Control opus. Quatro claimed that after meeting Tunstall, the pair wished to write a song together. However, they soon began writing enough songs to create an album. Further commitments by both artists to touring, promotional activities and the outbreak of the COVID-19 worldwide saw the plans delayed further. Despite set-backs, Quatro was confident that the recording of the album was "always going to be".

Both Quatro and Tunstall recorded the album in person, together, at a studio in England, with Quatro's son, LR Tuckey, serving as the album's sole producer. All tracks on the album were penned by both Quatro and Tunstall during several writing sessions, some of which took place at Quatro's home in the United States. Two tracks on the album, "Shine a Light" and "Truth Is My Weapon", are described as "showcasing the dynamic flow" that Quatro and Tunstall had during the recording sessions for the album in England.

When asked about the writing and recording process of the album, Quatro said that writing songs together felt like "the most natural thing in the world".

== Themes and composition ==
Face to Face is described as both artists' "personal journeys", and explores the themes of "love, loss, fear and triumph", paying tribute to both artists' journeys from "unknown hopefuls to rock icons". One of the album's tracks, "Shine a Light", was described as "unique" by The Courier, considering that Quatro "rose to global stardom fully three decades before Tunstall made people sit up and take notice with her 2004 debut album Eye To The Telescope".

The album's themes of love, loss, fear and triumph, are said to be meaningful to both Quatro and Tunstall, and qualities and attributes they have long had to demonstrate and face in their career, citing that they are "essential to their experiences as groundbreaking women in rock".

== Release and promotion ==
The lead single from Face to Face, "Shine a Light", was released on 16 June 2023, before the album. The song was penned by both Quatro and Tunstall, with Quatro claiming the song was written "about recognising and allowing that 'special' light inside of us to shine". Of the song, Tunstall said that "Shine A Light is not just about loving yourself, but also shedding those who wish to keep you down". Tunstall also expressed that both Quatro and she shared "our own stories of experiencing this, and how we've both learned to only let those people in who want to see good things happen for you". The music video for "Shine a Light" was directed, produced and edited by video director Josh McCartney, and features footage from the recording sessions for the album in England.

It was announced that there were no plans for a joint tour featuring Quatro and Tunstall. Instead, it was revealed that both Quatro and Tunstall will support the release of Face to Face on individual, separate solo international tours.

== Critical reception ==
The collaboration between Quatro and Tunstall on Face to Face was described by Rock Today as a "match made in heaven", further advocating that whilst "Suzi and KT are two very distinctive artists, each with their own style, they have come together to create an album which is as heartfelt as it is both uplifting and empowering". Bass Musician Magazine felt that the album "shares a lifetime of knowledge and sentiments that resonate with the listener at every level", whilst further claiming that "this album is a treat to enjoy and share with your friends". Australian online media publication The Rockpit said that Face to Face was an "exciting collaborative album".

== Commercial performance ==
Following release, Face to Face peaked at number 10 on the Scottish Albums Chart in the week of 24 August 2023, where it spent one week inside the top 100 in Scotland. The album failed to chart on the main UK Albums Charts, but did peak at number 14 on both the UK Albums Sales Chart and UK Physical Albums Chart, as well as number 15 on the UK Albums Downloads Chart and number 37 on the UK Record Store Chart.

Elsewhere, Face to Face reached a peak of number 41 on the official Swiss Albums Chart.

== Track listing ==
All songs on Face to Face were written by both Suzi Quatro and KT Tunstall, and were produced by LR Tuckey, unless noted.

Face to Face track listing
No.	Title	Length
1.	"Shine a Light"	3:24
2.	"Face to Face"	3:38
3.	"Scars"	3:27
4.	"Good Kinda Hot"	3:19
5.	"If I Come Home"	3:23
6.	"Damage"	2:21
7.	"Overload"	3:17
8.	"Illusion"	3:13
9.	"Truth as My Weapon"	2:39
10.	"The Ladies' Room"	3:26

== Chart performance ==
Chart performance for Face to Face
Chart (2023)	Peak position
Scottish Albums (Official Charts)	10
Swiss Albums (Schweizer Hitparade)	41
UK Album Downloads (Official Charts)	15
UK Album Sales (OCC)	14
UK Physical Albums (OCC)	14
UK Record Store Chart (OCC)	37
