= Rockin' with Suzi Q =

- Genre: Music radio, blues, rock, soul
- Country of origin: United Kingdom
- Language: English
- Home station: BBC Radio 2
- Hosted by: Suzi Quatro
- Written by: Suzi Quatro
- Audio format: Stereophonic sound
- Opening theme: "Sweet Little Rock 'n' Roller" by Chuck Berry
- Website: https://www.bbc.co.uk/programmes/b006wrq1

Rockin' with Suzi Q is a weekly radio programme broadcast on BBC Radio 2, featuring Suzi Quatro playing her favourite blues, rock, and soul tunes from independent record labels.

As well as researching and presenting radio programmes, Quatro is the first female bass guitar player to become a major rock star. This broke a barrier to women's participation in rock music.

== Format ==
Rockin' with Suzi Q was a weekly BBC Radio 2 music radio programme. It was researched and presented by Quatro.

Programmes started with Chuck Berry's "Sweet Little Rock 'n' Roller". In one programme, Quatro said "I've been doing this song for 30 years. It's what I was. It's what I am. It's what I always will be."

Next, Quatro would play her favourite blues, rock, and soul tunes from independent record labels, relating them back to her own life and experiences. She would also read out feedback received from listeners. An example was:

"Suzi is back with the music we love,
though many of the artists are in heaven above."

== Reception ==
Professional ratings
Review scores
Source	Rating
The Guardian (2005)	favourable
The Guardian (2007)	favourable
