= Quatro, Scott & Powell =

Studio album by Suzi Quatro, Andy Scott and Don Powell
- Released: January 24, 2017
- Genre: Hard rock
- Length: 65:00
- Label: Sony Australia
- Producer: Andy Scott

Suzi Quatro chronology
| In the Spotlight (2011) | Quatro, Scott & Powell (2017) | No Control (2019) |

Quatro, Scott & Powell, also typeset Quatro Scott Powell and known as QSP, is the first album by the supergroup of the same name, composed of American musician Suzi Quatro, Welsh guitarist and producer Andy Scott and English drummer Don Powell. It was released in Australia on January 24, 2017, debuting in the top 25 of the albums chart and spending four weeks on the chart, with a deluxe edition containing two extra tracks released later that year in Europe.

== Critical reception ==
Professional ratings
Review scores
| Source | Rating |
|---|---|
| Classic Rock | 4/5 stars |

Ian Fortnam of Classic Rock wrote that "from their opening tumultuous roar through Larry Williams's 'Slow Down', QSP are so fully on top of their game that you wonder why they've never done this before" as "Quatro's bass and Powell's drums lock together as a single unit". Fortnam also acclaimed the "original compositions" as they "marry craftsmanship with emotional experience". In a later overview of Quatro's albums, Fortnam called Quatro, Scott & Powell "a match made in glam heaven" as "Andy Scott matches raw power with emotional depth to excellent effect" and his "production accentuates the heft of Quatro's routinely overlooked bass playing and her uncanny ability to utterly inhabit a song".

== Track listing ==
Quatro, Scott & Powell track listing
| No. | Title | Writer(s) | Length |
|---|---|---|---|
| 1. | "Slow Down" | Larry Williams | 3:46 |
| 2. | "Long Way from Home" | Andy Scott; Suzi Quatro | 6:13 |
| 3. | "Tobacco Road" | John D. Loudermilk | 3:42 |
| 4. | "If Only" | Quatro; Dick Wagner | 4:44 |
| 5. | "Bright Lights Big City" | Jimmy Reed | 5:45 |
| 6. | "Pain" (orchestral) | Scott; Quatro | 4:00 |
| 7. | "Just Like a Woman" | Bob Dylan | 5:12 |
| 8. | "Mend a Broken Heart" | Scott | 3:34 |
| 9. | "The Price of Love" | The Everly Brothers | 5:03 |
| 10. | "Broken Pieces Suite" | Quatro | 5:54 |
| 11. | "I Walk on Gilded Splinters" | Dr. John | 5:57 |
| 12. | "Late Nights Early Flights" | Scott; Quatro | 3:53 |
| 13. | "Little Sister" | Doc Pomus; Mort Shuman | 3:09 |
| 14. | "Pain" (band version; bonus track) | Scott; Quatro | 4:08 |
| Total length: | | | 65:00 |

European deluxe edition bonus tracks
| No. | Title | Writer(s) | Length |
|---|---|---|---|
| 14. | "Fever" | Eddie Cooley; John Davenport | 5:38 |
| 15. | "Tossin' & Turnin'" | Ritchie Adams; Malou René | 3:15 |
| Total length: | | | 73:55 |

The European deluxe edition swaps the band and orchestral versions of "Pain", with the band version as track six and the orchestral version as track 16, after the two bonus tracks.

== Charts ==
Chart performance for Quatro, Scott & Powell
| Chart (2017) | Peak position |
|---|---|
| Australian Albums (ARIA) | 23 |
