= Two Way (song) =

Song by KT Tunstall and James Bay

from the album KIN
- Released: 9 September 2016
- Recorded: 2015–16
- Length: 4:53
- Label: Caroline; Sony/ATV Music
- Songwriter(s): KT Tunstall; James Bay
- Producer(s): Tony Hoffer

"Two Way" is a duet song by Scottish recording artist KT Tunstall and English singer-songwriter James Bay. It was released on 9 September 2016 with her fifth studio album KIN.

It was revealed on 15 July 2016 that both of them had been writing and recording a duet called "Two Way". The song was produced by Tony Hoffer, and it is the seventh track on the album.

== Background ==
"Two Way" was written in 2016, in L.A. with 2016 Grammy Awards nominee James Bay. Bay and Tunstall met during Jools Holland's Hootenanny. Tunstall had read in an interview that he was a fan of hers, so she chatted with him, and they decided to record a duet. Tunstall says in an interview with the UK newspaper Evening Standard that Bay is "one of the most talented new songwriters", and added "it was fantastic to work with him".

== Music video ==
On a Facebook post on 5 October 2017, Tunstall announced a surprise, showing the emoji of an informatic virus as a clue. Due to a technical error, the surprise had to be delayed.

During a Facebook live chat on 19 October 2017, KT Tunstall announced the follow-up album of KIN, and broadcast the music video for Two Way.

The video doesn't portray KT Tunstall nor James Bay, it is a music video made on an old 2D video game. It was directed by Christopher M. Anthony.
