= The Devil in Me (Suzi Quatro album) =

Studio album by Suzi Quatro
- Released: March 26, 2021
- Genre: Hard rock
- Length: 43:33
- Label: Steamhammer
- Producer: Richard Tuckey

Suzi Quatro chronology
No Control (2019)	The Devil in Me (2021)	Face to Face (2023)

The Devil in Me is the seventeenth solo studio album by American musician Suzi Quatro, released on March 26, 2021, through Steamhammer. It was produced by her son Richard Tuckey.

== Critical reception ==
Professional ratings
Review scores
Source	Rating
The Arts Desk	3/5 stars
Classic Rock	3.5/5 stars

Lisa-Marie Ferla of The Arts Desk wrote that The Devil in Me "bursts out of the gate with a title track and string of songs that place it in the same lineage as her 1970s glam rock catalogue, all chugging bass and snarling vocals", before the pace changes after track five, and concluding "Suzi Quatro at 70 is a long way from done". Julian Marszalek of Classic Rock stated that "if her latest album The Devil in Me proves anything it's that you can take Suzi Quatro out of Detroit, but you'll never take Detroit out of Suzi" as the tracks make "considerable nods to her roots and inspirations". Marszalek summarized that "if the devil does have the best tunes, then Suzi Quatro is grabbing enough of them here". Will Russell of Hot Press felt that "Quatro and her trusty bass are in excellent form" and the album "is a most valuable addition to her canon".

== Track listing ==
The Devil in Me track listing
No.	Title	Length
1.	"The Devil in Me"	3:25
2.	"Hey Queenie"	4:08
3.	"Betty Who"	3:57
4.	"You Can't Dream It"	3:10
5.	"My Heart and Soul"	5:13
6.	"Get Outta Jail"	3:17
7.	"Do Ya Dance"	2:44
8.	"Isolation Blues"	3:36
9.	"I Sold My Soul"	2:37
10.	"Love's Gone Bad"	4:25
11.	"In the Dark"	3:08
12.	"Motor City Riders"	3:53
Total length:		43:33

== Charts ==
Chart performance for The Devil in Me
Chart (2021)	Peak position
German Albums (Offizielle Top 100)	28
Swiss Albums (Schweizer Hitparade)	24
Scottish Albums (OCC)	69
UK Independent Albums (OCC)	18
UK Rock & Metal Albums (OCC)	10
