= Suzi Quatro =

American-British rock musician (born 1950)

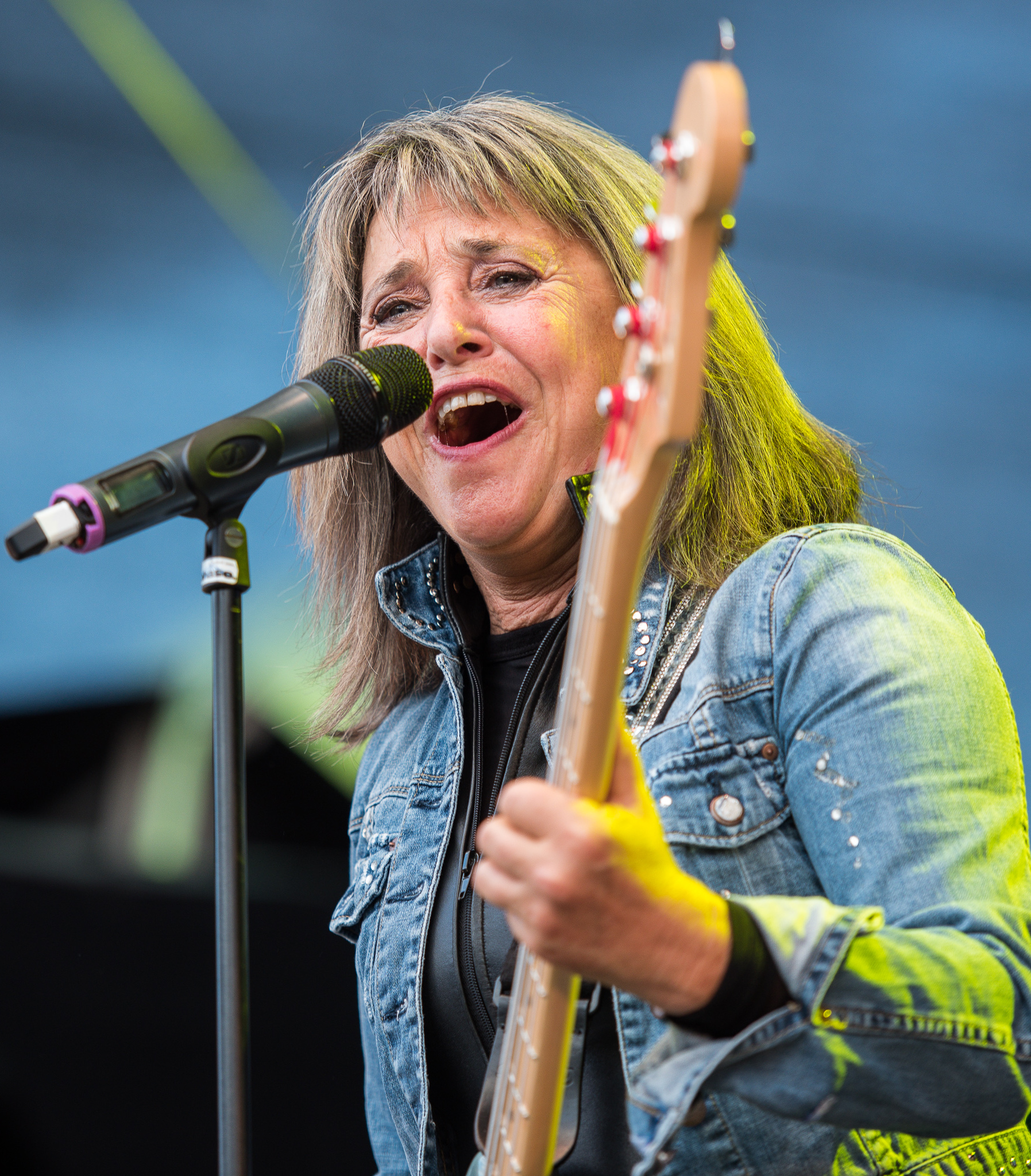
- Quatro performing in 2017

Background information
- Born: Susan Kay Quatro; June 3, 1950 (age 76); Detroit, Michigan, U.S.
- Genres: Rock; hard rock; glam rock; pop rock
- Occupations: Singer; musician; songwriter; actress; radio host
- Instruments: Vocals; bass guitar; keyboards
- Years active: 1964–present
- Labels: Mercury; Rak; Arista; EMI Int'l; EMI; BGO; Disky; Razor & Tie; RSO; AIP; First Night; CD Baby; Cherry Red
- Formerly of: The Pleasure Seekers
- Website: suziquatro.com

Susan Kay Quatro (born June 3, 1950) is a American-British singer, bass guitarist, songwriter, and actress. In the 1970s, she scored a string of singles that found success in Europe and Australia, with both "Can the Can" (1973) and "Devil Gate Drive" (1974) reaching number one in several countries.

Quatro released her self-titled debut album in 1973. Since then, she has released 15 studio albums, 10 compilation albums, and one live album. Other songs, including "48 Crash", "Daytona Demon", "The Wild One", and "Your Mama Won't Like Me", also charted highly overseas. Following a recurring role as bass player Leather Tuscadero on the popular American sitcom Happy Days, her duet "Stumblin' In" with Smokie's lead singer Chris Norman reached number four in the US, her only song to chart in the top 40 in her homeland.

Between 1973 and 1980, Quatro was awarded six Bravo Ottos, an award given to musicians as voted in the German teen magazine Bravo. In 2010, she was voted into the Michigan Rock and Roll Legends online Hall of Fame. She is reported to have sold over 50 million records worldwide, and continues to perform live. Quatro's most recent studio album, Face to Face, was released in 2023 and follows the 2021 collaboration The Devil in Me with her son Richard Tuckey, who had already taken part in No Control in 2019. Quatro also remains active in radio broadcasting.

== Early life ==
Quatro was born and raised in Detroit. Her father, Art, was a semiprofessional musician and worked at General Motors. Her paternal grandfather was an Italian immigrant to the U.S. Her mother, Helen, was Hungarian and died in 1992. Her family name of "Quattrocchi" ("four eyes", meaning "bespectacled") was shortened to Quatro. Quatro's family was living in Detroit when she was born. She has three sisters, a brother (Michael Quatro), and one older half-sister. Her parents fostered several other children while she was growing up. Quatro grew up to be an "extrovert but solitary," according to Philip Norman of The Sunday Times, and she only became close to her mother after leaving the US for Britain.

Quatro's sister Arlene is the mother of actress Sherilyn Fenn. Her sister Patti joined Fanny, one of the earliest all-female rock bands to gain national attention. Her brother, Michael Quatro, is also a musician.

Quatro was influenced at the age of six by seeing Elvis Presley perform on television. She has said that she had no direct female role models in music, but was inspired by Billie Holiday and liked the dress sense of Mary Weiss of the Shangri-Las "because she wore tight trousers and a waistcoat on top – she looked hot".

Quatro received formal training in playing classical piano and percussion—her first instrument was bongos. She taught herself how to play the bass, after her sister asked her to learn it for her first band, the Pleasure Seekers. Her father gave her a 1957 Fender Precision Bass guitar in 1964, which she still uses in the studio.

== Career ==
=== Early career and the Art Quatro Trio ===
Quatro played drums or percussion from an early age as part of her father's jazz band, the Art Quatro Trio. Sources vary on whether she began playing in the band at age seven or eight, and whether she played a drum kit or percussion (bongo or congas). Subsequently, she appeared on local television as a go-go dancer in a pop music series.

=== The Pleasure Seekers and Cradle ===
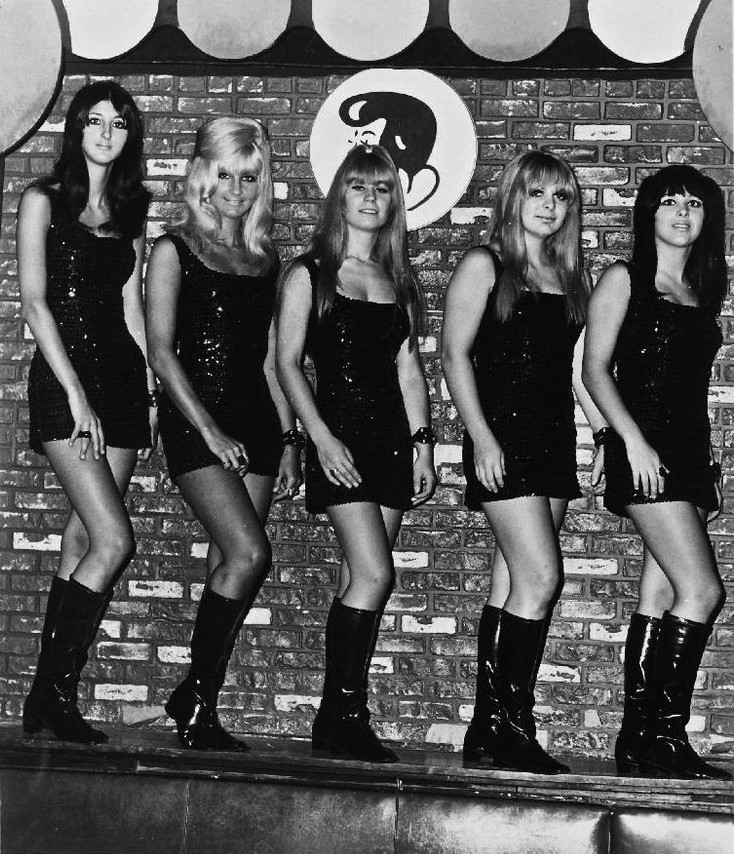
Quatro, at far right, pictured, along with two of her sisters, Patti and Arlene, and Eileen Biddlingmeier (center), in the Pleasure Seekers, 1966

In 1964, after seeing a television performance by the Beatles, Quatro's older sister, Patti, had formed an all-female garage rock band called the Pleasure Seekers with two friends. Quatro joined, too, and assumed the stage name of Suzi Soul; Patti Quatro was known as Patti Pleasure. Suzi sang and played bass in the band. The band also later featured another sister, Arlene. Many of their performances were in cabarets, where attention was (initially) focused more on their physical looks than their actual music. They sometimes had to wear miniskirts and wigs, which Quatro later considered to be necessary evils in the pursuit of success. They became well-known fixtures, though, in the burgeoning Detroit music community.

The Pleasure Seekers recorded three singles and released two: "Never Thought You'd Leave Me" / "What a Way to Die" (1966) and "Light of Love" / "Good Kind of Hurt" (1968). The second of these was released by Mercury Records, with whom they briefly had a contract before breaking away due to differences of opinion regarding their future direction. They changed their name to Cradle in late 1969, not long after another Quatro sister, Nancy, had joined the band and Arlene had left following the birth of her child.

=== Work with Mickie Most ===
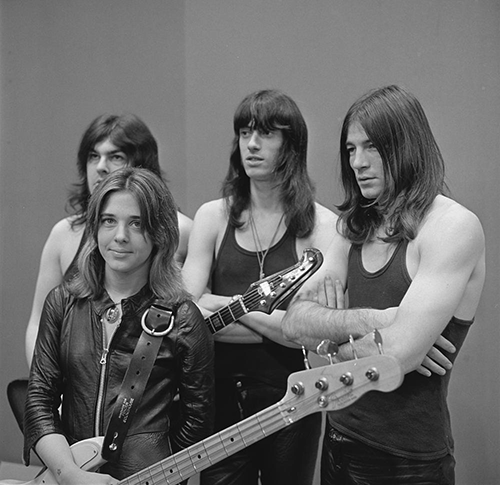
Quatro and her supporting band in AVRO's TopPop, a Dutch television show, on December 7, 1973 (Left to right: Len Tuckey, guitar; Suzi Quatro, bass guitar; Alastair MacKenzie, keyboards; Dave Neal, drums)

Quatro's brother Michael – who was managing the band – persuaded record producer Mickie Most to see Cradle. Looking for a female rock singer who could fill the void created by the death of Janis Joplin, Most was drawn by "her comeliness and skills as bass guitarist, singer, and chief show-off in Cradle." Quatro sang the background vocals on Barabajagal, recorded in May 1969 at Olympic Studios in London by British singer/songwriter Donovan.

She had also been attracting attention from Elektra Records, and subsequently explained, "According to the Elektra president, I could become the new Janis Joplin. Mickie Most offered to take me to England and make me the first Suzi Quatro – I didn't want to be the new anybody." Most had no interest in the other band members, and he had no idea at that time of how he might market Quatro. She spent a year living in a hotel, where she was nurtured by Most, developing her skills and maturing. Most later said that the outcome was a reflection of her own personality.

Quatro's first single, "Rolling Stone", was successful only in Portugal, where it reached number one on the charts. This was a solo effort, although aided by people such as Duncan Browne, Peter Frampton and Alan White. Subsequently, with the approval of Most, she auditioned for a band to accompany her. It was also after this record that Most introduced her to the songwriting and production team of Nicky Chinn and Mike Chapman, who wrote songs specifically to accord with her image. She agreed with Most's assessment of her image, saying that his influence, at which some of his artists – such as Jeff Beck and Rod Stewart – balked, did not extend to manufacture and that "If he tried to build me into a Lulu, I wouldn't have it. I'd say 'go to hell' and walk out." This was the height of the glam rock period of the 1970s and Quatro, who wore leather clothes, portrayed a wild image while playing music that "hinged mostly on a hard rock chug beneath lyrics in which scansion overruled meaning." (Note: Quatro appears to have changed her look after the failure of "Rolling Stone". Simon Frith wrote in August 1974 that when Most had first introduced him to her, she was "... a musician and not a glamour girl. ... Her press photos showed a thoughtful, natural, healthy girl in jeans and a singlet; she was sitting in a field and looking at the sky, clearly a singer-songwriter – sexy, but in an adult sort of way" and that this image was changed after "Rolling Stone": "Underwear is what Suzi Quatro doesn't wear anymore. Since May 1973, she's never been seen in anything but soft leather cat suits with zips down the front. No bra, no panties, but lots of chains and big boots. She put her band together. It's got three men in black vests and biceps.")

In 1972, Quatro embarked as a support act on a UK tour with Thin Lizzy and headliners Slade. Rak Records arranged for her to use Thin Lizzy's newly acquired PA system during this, incurring a charge of £300 per week that enabled the Irish band to effectively purchase it at no cost to themselves. In May 1973, her second single "Can the Can" (1973) – which Philip Auslander describes as having "seemingly nonsensical and virtually unintelligible lyrics" – was a number-one hit in parts of Europe and in Australia.

"Can the Can" was followed by three further hits: "48 Crash" (1973), "Daytona Demon" (1973), and "Devil Gate Drive" (1974), each of which sold over one million copies and were awarded gold discs, although they met with little success in her native United States, where she had toured as a support act for Alice Cooper. Rak Records' artists had generally not succeeded in the US and her first album, Suzi Quatro, was criticized by Alan Betrock for its lack of variety, for its Quatro-written "second-rate fillers" and for her voice, described as "often too high and shrill, lacking punch or distinctive phrasing." Writing for Rolling Stone, Greg Shaw was also downbeat, saying that the album "may be a necessary beginning".

In 1973, Quatro played on the Cozy Powell hit "Dance With the Devil", a track written by Mickie Most while Cozy Powell was part of the Rak Records roster.

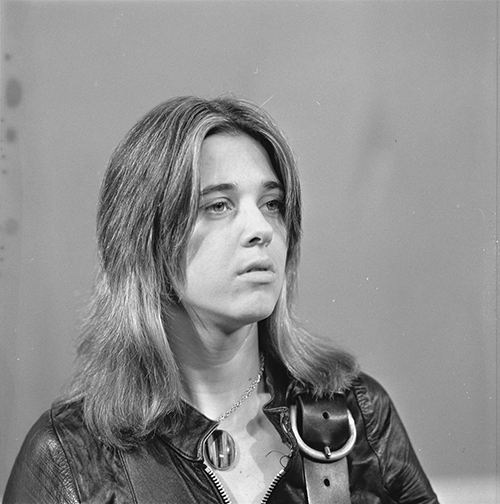
Quatro on the TopPop television program, 1973

Musicians who acted as her backing band around this period included Alastair McKenzie, Dave Neal, and Len Tuckey, with Robbie Blunt also being listed by some sources. Tuckey's brother, Bill, acted as tour manager.

With the exception of Australia, her chart success faltered thereafter, as proven with her 1975 hit "Your Mamma Won't Like Me", which proved to be a moderate success in the UK. Further singles, "I Bit off More Than I Could Chew" and "I May Be Too Young", both failed to reach the UK Top 50. Quatro recorded the album Aggro-Phobia in 1976 and released a new single in 1977 called "Tear Me Apart", which reached the UK top 30, her first hit to have done so in three years. Another year passed before she had another big hit, this time with a change to a more mellow style giving Quatro a 1978 single "If You Can't Give Me Love" that became a hit there and in the United Kingdom. Later that year, "Stumblin' In", a duet with Chris Norman of the band Smokie, reached number four in the US. Both tracks were featured on the If You Knew Suzi... album. A year later, Quatro released Suzi ... and Other Four Letter Words, but none of her other work had much US success. This featured the hits "She's in Love with You", which made number 11 in Britain, "Mama's Boy" (number 34), and "I've Never Been in Love" (number 56).

=== Mike Chapman and Dreamland Records ===
In 1980, after Quatro's contract with Mickie Most had expired, she signed with Chapman's Dreamland Records.

In the same year, she released the album Rock Hard; both the album and title single went platinum in Australia. Rock Hard was also used in the cult film Times Square and was included on the soundtrack album. The single reached number 11 in Australia, but only 68 in the UK due to distribution problems. At this point her hit single career clearly was beginning to wane. A second single from the Rock Hard album, titled "Lipstick", was released in February 1981, but radio refused to play it, as they claimed it sounded too much like "Gloria" by Them. Suzi Quatro's Greatest Hits, which was released in 1980, peaked at number four in the UK chart, becoming her highest-charting album there.

=== Independence ===
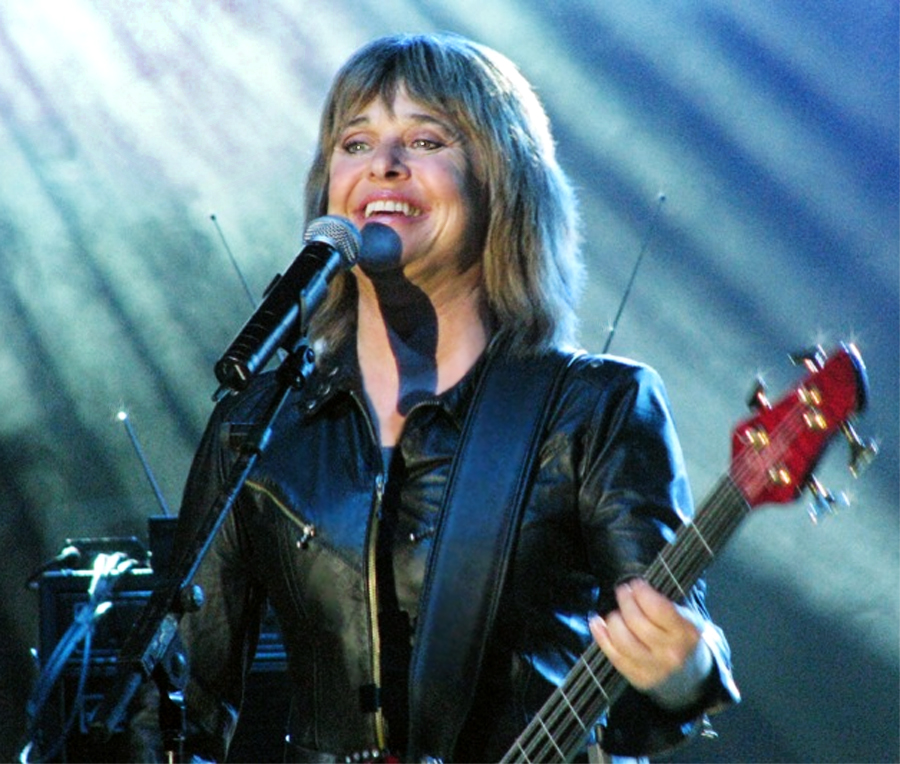
Quatro performing live at the AIS Arena, in Canberra, Australia, 2007

After Chapman's Dreamland Records folded in 1981, Quatro was left without a record label.

Her last UK hit for some time was "Heart of Stone" in late 1982. In 1983, another single "Main Attraction" was released. It failed to chart, but did become a moderate airplay hit. She commented in an article for Kerrang! in 1983, after playing a successful show at Reading Festival on August 27, that she did not care about being in the charts, but was more interested in releasing what she wanted to, commenting that she started in 1964, and did not become famous for nine years. "I would never accept having my career molded by other people ... I've kept working consistently even though I've not been in the charts."

Around this time, Quatro recorded a new album that was shelved until 1997, when it was issued as Unreleased Emotion. Quatro briefly returned to recording for two more singles, "I Go Wild" in 1984, and in 1985 her "Tonight I Could Fall in Love"/"Good Girl (Looking for a Bad Time)" single reached number 140 in the UK charts. Quatro also collaborated with Bronski Beat and members of the Kinks, Eddie and the Hot Rods, and Dr. Feelgood on the Mark Cunningham-produced cover version of David Bowie's "Heroes", released the following year as the 1986 BBC Children in Need single. Quatro also released a cover version of "Wild Thing" in November 1986, as a duet with The Troggs singer Reg Presley. "Can the Can"/"Devil Gate Drive" were re-released in 1987 as a single and reached number 87 in the UK charts. She was also part of the Ferry Aid charity single "Let It Be", which was a UK number one, 13 years and 26 days after Quatro's last UK number-one song.

In 1989, Quatro released a prerecorded backing track single, "Baby You're a Star", which was released in the UK, though it failed to chart. By the late 1980s, Quatro's hitmaking days were clearly over, though she still recorded persistently despite lack of chart success. During the 1990s, Quatro released four new albums, though Unreleased Emotion had been recorded several years previously. What Goes Around – Greatest & Latest was released in 1995 and consisted of mainly older hits rerecorded; this proved a success in Denmark. Except for 1999's Free the Butterfly self-help album, a further 11 years were needed for Quatro to release a new album. Back to the Drive in 2006 showed a return to Quatro's harder rock roots, rather than the smoother sounds of her previous albums. Back to the Drive also returned Quatro to the worldwide charts – her first album to do so since the 1980s Rock Hard. Back to the Drive also produced a download-only single, "I'll Walk Through the Fire with You". Quatro released In the Spotlight in 2011 with the lead single, "Whatever Love Is". Quatro marked her 50th anniversary in the music industry with an anthology, Girl from Detroit, in 2014 with two new tracks.

Around 2005, a documentary chronicling Quatro's life, Naked Under Leather, named after a 1975 bootleg album recorded in Japan, directed by a former member of the Runaways, Victory Tischler-Blue, was made, but this has never been released. In February 2006, Quatro released Back to the Drive, produced by Sweet guitarist Andy Scott. The album's title track was written by her former collaborator, Chapman. In March 2007, Quatro released a cover version of the Eagles song "Desperado", followed by the publication of her autobiography, Unzipped. By this time, Quatro had sold 50 million records.

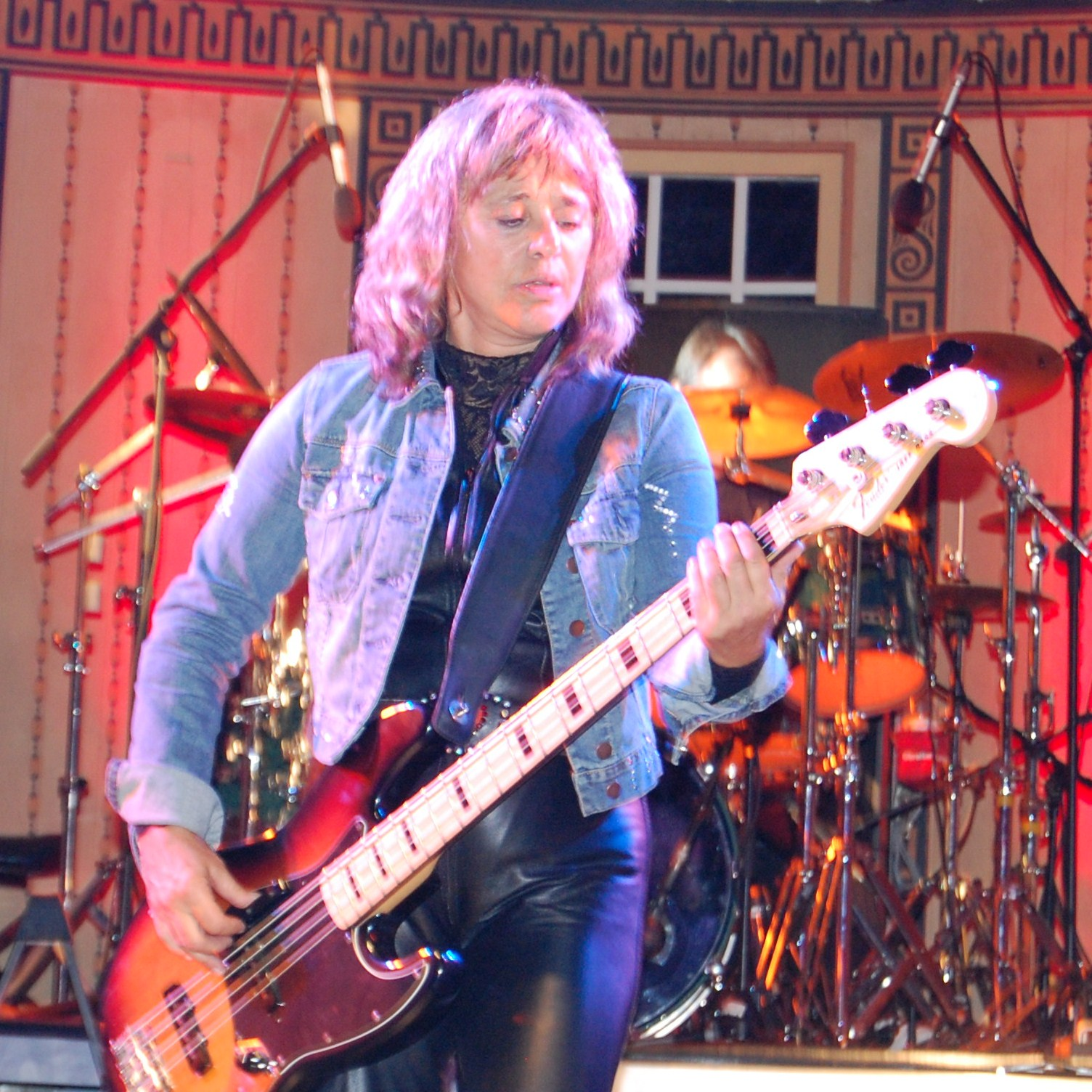
Quatro performing in 2011

On June 11, 2010, she headlined the 'Girls Night Out' at the Isle of Wight Festival. Quatro was also inducted into the Michigan Rock and Roll Legends online Hall of Fame in 2010, following an on-line vote.

In August 2011, Quatro released her 15th studio album, In the Spotlight (and its single, "Spotlight"). This album is a mixture of new songs written by Mike Chapman and by herself, along with some cover versions. A second single from the album, "Whatever Love Is", was subsequently released. On November 16, 2011, a music video (by Tischler-Blue) for the track "Strict Machine" was released onto the Suzi Quatro Official YouTube channel. The track is a cover of Goldfrapp's "Strict Machine", but Quatro's version contains two lines from "Can the Can", referencing the similarity of the tunes for the two songs.

In April 2013, she performed in America for the first time in over 30 years, at the Detroit Music Awards, where she received the Distinguished Lifetime Achievement Award, presented to her by her sister, Patti.

In 2017, Quatro released her 16th studio album backed by Andy Scott from Sweet on guitar and Don Powell from Slade on drums.

In August 2023, Quatro released an album of duets with KT Tunstall entitled Face to Face. After discovering they were mutual fans of each other, they were put in touch with each other by a mutual friend.

=== Acting and radio hosting ===
Quatro is possibly best known in the United States for her role as the bass player Leather Tuscadero on the television show Happy Days in 1977. The show's producer, Garry Marshall, had offered her the role without having an audition after seeing a photograph of her on his daughter's bedroom wall. Toby Mamis, who was acting as her US representative at that time, helped broker the deal and generate enormous media attention to it, elevating Quatro's profile in her home country. Leather was the younger sister of Fonzie's former girlfriend, motorcycle trick rider Pinky Tuscadero. Leather fronted a rock band joined by principal characters Richie Cunningham, Potsie Weber, Ralph Malph, Chachi Arcola, and even Joanie Cunningham once. The character returned in other guest roles, including once for a date to a fraternity formal with Ralph Malph. Marshall offered Quatro a Leather Tuscadero spin-off, but she declined the offer, saying she did not want to be typecast.

Her other acting roles include a 1982 episode of the British comedy-drama series Minder (called "Dead Men Do Tell Tales") as Nancy, the singer girlfriend of Terry (Dennis Waterman). In 1985, she starred as a mentally disturbed ex-MI5 operative in Dempsey and Makepeace – "Love you to Death". In February 2022 Quatro gave an exclusive interview to Paul Stenning regarding her appearance in both shows.

In 1994, she made a cameo appearance as a nurse in the "Hospital" episode of the comedy Absolutely Fabulous. She also was filmed in the 1990 Clive Barker horror film Nightbreed, but the studio cut out her character. In 2006, Quatro performed the voice of Rio in the Bob the Builder film Built to Be Wild, and appeared in an episode of the second season of Rock School, in Lowestoft. She also appeared in the episode "The Axeman Cometh" of Midsomer murders in the role of Mimi Clifton.

Quatro has also performed in theater. In 1986, she appeared as Annie Oakley in a London production of Annie Get Your Gun and in 1991, she performed the title role in a musical about the life of actress Tallulah Bankhead. Titled Tallulah Who?, which had music and lyrics co-written by Shirlie Roden and her, with a book by Willie Rushton. It ran from February 14 to March 9 at Hornchurch, England, where it was billed as "You'll be amazed how Tallulah did it, and to whom – and how often!" The show received favorable reviews from the majority of critics.

In more recent times, Quatro has hosted weekly rock and roll programs on BBC Radio 2. The first one was titled Rockin' with Suzi Q, while her second was given the title Wake Up Little Suzi.

== Songwriting ==
She started writing songs alone, then collaborated with other songwriters (such as Len Tuckey, Rhiannon Wolfe, and Shirley Roden), and now mainly writes songs alone once again.

Quatro's early recorded songwriting was deliberately limited to album tracks and the B-sides of singles. She said in late 1973, "... [the] album tracks are a very different story from [the] singles. The two-minute low-and-behold commercial single will not come out of my brain, but ain't I gonna worry about it."

She describes creating a new song: "From sitting at my piano in my front room, writing down a title (always first), picking up my bass, figuring out the groove, going back to the piano ... working on the lyrics, playing electric guitar ... and finally I type out the lyrics. Only then is it officially a song. Next it goes down on my tiny 8-track, [with] me playing everything ... this is the version all muso's use to get into the tune ... then into the studio and we go from there."

== Personal life ==
Quatro married her long-time guitarist, Len Tuckey, in 1976. They had two children together, and divorced in 1992. Before 1993, Quatro lived with her two children in a manor house not far from Chelmsford, Essex, England, that she and Tuckey bought in 1980.

She married German concert promoter Rainer Haas in 1993. In 2006, her daughter and grandchild moved back into the Essex manor house. Toward the end of 2008, Quatro's children had moved out of the house and she temporarily put it up for sale, stating that she had empty nest syndrome. Quatro continues to live in Essex and Hamburg, and sometimes in Detroit.

Since 2011, she has published music videos on YouTube. On March 31, 2012, Quatro broke her right knee and left wrist while boarding an aircraft in Kyiv, Ukraine, where she had performed the night before. As a result, she had to cancel her appearance at the Detroit Music Awards on April 27, where she was to perform and be inducted into the Detroit Hall of Fame along with her sisters. Had she been able to go, that would have been her first performance in America in over 30 years. Quatro also had to reschedule other concert dates, while some were canceled altogether.

Quatro has lived in England since 1971. She became a British citizen in early 2026.

== Public image ==
In a 2012 interview, Quatro was asked what she thought she had achieved for female rockers in general. She replied:

Before I did what I did, we didn't have a place in rock 'n' roll. Not really. You had your Grace Slick and all that, but that's not what I did. I was the first to be taken seriously as a female rock 'n' roll musician and singer. That hadn't been done before. I played the boys at their own game. For everybody that came afterward, it was a little bit easier, which is good. I'm proud of that. If I have a legacy, that's what it is. It's nothing I take lightly. It was gonna happen sooner or later. In 2014, I will have done my job 50 years. It was gonna be done by somebody, and I think it fell to me to do because I don't look at gender. I never have. It doesn't occur to me if a 6-foot-tall guy has pissed me off not to square up to him. That's just the way I am. If I wanted to play a bass solo, it never occurred to me that I couldn't. When I saw Elvis for the first time when I was five, I decided I wanted to be him, and it didn't occur to me that he was a guy. That's why it had to fall to somebody like me. (Note: Quatro actually had her "Elvis moment" on January 6, 1957, when she was six years old, not five. With her older sister Arlene, she was watching the third (and final) appearance of Elvis Presley on The Ed Sullivan Show. Arlene was screaming as Elvis sang "Don't Be Cruel". When he sang "Mmmmmm", Quatro had her first sexual thrill (but did not know what it was). Then their father (Art) entered the room, said "That's disgusting", and switched off the television. At this point, Quatro decided that she wanted to be Elvis. Art later brought home a copy of Elvis singing "Love Me Tender" and conceded, "OK, dammit – so the kid can sing!")

In a 1973 interview, Quatro sympathized with many of the opinions voiced by the women's liberation movement, while distancing herself from it because she considered that the participants were

... completely hypocritical. Their leaders stand up there and say, 'We're individuals blab blab blab,' and yet they're all in a group following like sheep. For me, I cannot put the two together ... I'm talking about the masses that follow [the movement's leaders who get press attention] and who have nothing at all to say. It gives it all a very phony light. I hope they can find a way to apply it to their own lives, because grouping together takes away the whole idea of Women's Lib.

The interviewer, Charles Shaar Murray, considered her viewpoint to be "... somewhat anomalous, because unless the woman in question happens to be well known, she has no way of letting people hear her unless she unites with other women and then elects a spokesman." He also noted the apparent contradiction that Quatro seemed proud that girls were writing to her saying that they were emulating her look and her attitude. In 1974, Quatro believed that, unlike men, women were burdened with emotional responses and that it was more difficult for them to succeed in the music industry because they are more prone to jealousy and thus female audiences tend not to buy the recordings of female artists. Her unusually free use of swear words in conversation was often picked upon by interviewers in the 1970s, as have been her diminutive stature and boy-ish nature. In 1974, Philip Norman said that

Of all female rock singers, she appears the most emancipated: A small girl leading an all-man group in which she herself plays bass guitar. The image is of a tomboy, lank-haired, tight-bottomed and (twice) tattooed; a rocker, a brooder, a loner, a knife-carrier; a hell-cat, a wild cat, a storm child, refugee from the frightened city of Detroit. (Note: Quatro has a tulip tattooed on her shoulder and a star on her wrist.)

== Awards and honors ==
In 2020, Quatro was awarded the Icon Award by the Women's International Music Network.

In 2011, Quatro was inducted to the Michigan Rock and Roll Legends Hall of Fame.

In October 2016, Quatro received an honorary doctorate in music from Anglia Ruskin University, Cambridge, UK, along with Dr. Feelgood's Wilko Johnson.

On August 15, 2019, an Australian-made film on the life of Quatro premiered in Melbourne, Victoria. Suzi Q is noted as the first official documentary to ever be released about her. It was described by Quatro as a "warts and all" look into her career, focusing on both her successes and challenges faced along the way, particularly as she left her sisters in Detroit to pursue a solo career in London. Quatro stated that she was drawn to having Melbourne-based director Liam Firmager make the film, "Because although he liked my music, he wasn't particularly 'a fan', which meant he was objective, and wouldn't spend all his time telling me how great I am. ... I like that, he was the right guy for the job".

=== Bravo Otto ===
Bravo is the largest magazine for teenagers in German-speaking Europe. Each year, the readers of this magazine select the Bravo Otto award winners.

Quatro has won the following Bravo Otto awards:

- 1973 Gold for female singer
- 1974 Gold for female singer
- 1975 Bronze for female singer
- 1978 Bronze for female singer
- 1979 Bronze for female singer
- 1980 Silver for female singer

=== Queens of British Pop ===
In April 2009, BBC TV selected Quatro as one of 12 queens of British pop.

== Legacy and influence ==
=== Views of journalists and reviewers ===
In August 1974, Simon Frith spotted a problem with the formula that was working outside the US, saying that

Suzi's facing a bit of a [commercial] crisis: Chinn and Chapman, having proved their point, are losing interest in her. She's never had their best material (they don't play many games with her) and each of her singles has been less gripping than the one before. Unless they suddenly imagine a new joke, she's in danger of petering out and she lacks the resources to fight back. None of her own musical talents has been needed and so they've been ignored (except on the throwaway B-sides) and while Sweet and Mud have their histories and themselves to draw on for support, Suzi's present has nothing to do with her past and her group was formed only to play Chinnichap music. Mud may become a top cabaret act and Sweet a respected rock group, but Suzi will only be a memory. Mickie Most's skill in the '60s was to make pop music out of British blues and R&B and folk; Chinn and Chapman's skill in the '70s has been to make pop music out of an audience. As this audience ages and changes, so will its music and Suzi Quatro will have been just an affectionate part of growing up.

In 1983, journalist Tom Hibbert wrote that Quatro may have overstated her role as a leading light among female rock musicians. He said that

... it was in the wake of the 1977 punk revolution that the traditions of rock were turned upside down and female musicians truly came to the fore. But Suzi Quatro, with her tomboy sneers, her bass guitar and her stompingly persuasive teen-tunes, had at least laid down a challenge to the male-dominated rock orthodoxy. On stage in the Eighties, Quatro was still conveying energy and excitement – and she still lacked class."

=== Views of scholars ===
In his 2008 paper Suzi Quatro: A prototype in the archsheology of rock, Frank Oglesbee writes, "The rebellion of rock music was largely a male rebellion; the women—often, in the 1950s and '60s, girls in their teens—in rock usually sang songs as personæ utterly dependent on their macho boyfriends". He describes Quatro as "a female rock pioneer, in some ways the female rock pioneer ... a cornerstone in the archaeology of rock." He said she grew up to become "the first female lead singer and bassist, an electric ax-woman, who sang and played as freely as the males, inspiring other females."

Philip Auslander says, "Although there were many women in rock by the late 1960s, most performed only as singers, a traditionally feminine position in popular music". Though some women (like Quatro herself) played instruments in American all-female garage rock bands, none of these bands achieved more than regional success. So, they "did not provide viable templates for women's on-going participation in rock". When Quatro emerged in 1973, "no other prominent female musician worked in rock simultaneously as a singer, instrumentalist, songwriter, and bandleader". Auslander adds that in 2000 Quatro saw herself as "kicking down the male door in rock and roll and proving that a female musician ... and this is a point I am extremely concerned about ... could play as well if not better than the boys".

=== People and bands influenced by Quatro ===
Quatro has influenced various female musicians. Musician Tina Weymouth, who played bass guitar in Talking Heads and Tom Tom Club, among other bands, first learned to play bass by listening to Quatro albums.

Quatro had a direct influence on the Runaways and Joan Jett, as well as Girlschool and Chrissie Hynde. Musician Kathy Valentine, best known for her work as bass player for The Go-Go's, cited Quatro as a major influence in her 2020 autobiography All I Ever Wanted.

Mid-1990s American indie rock band Tuscadero was named after Quatro's Happy Days character Leather Tuscadero, and their song "Leather Idol", from their 1994 album The Pink Album, was an ode to both Quatro and her TV character.

On the cover of Scottish singer-songwriter KT Tunstall's 2007 album Drastic Fantastic, Tunstall is dressed like Quatro, as a deliberate homage. (Note: In March 2011, Quatro suggested that KT Tunstall would be an ideal person to play the lead role in any theater show based on Quatro's own life.)

On October 24, 2013, Quatro received the Woman of Valor Award from the organization Musicians for Equal Opportunities for Women (MEOW) for her role inspiring and influencing generations of female musicians. The award was bestowed by Kathy Valentine (formerly of The Go-Go's) at a dinner in her honor in Austin, Texas, at the Austin Renaissance Hotel. Quatro performed five songs with a local band that included her sister Patti and Tony Scalzo of the band Fastball on "Stumblin In".

== Musical style ==
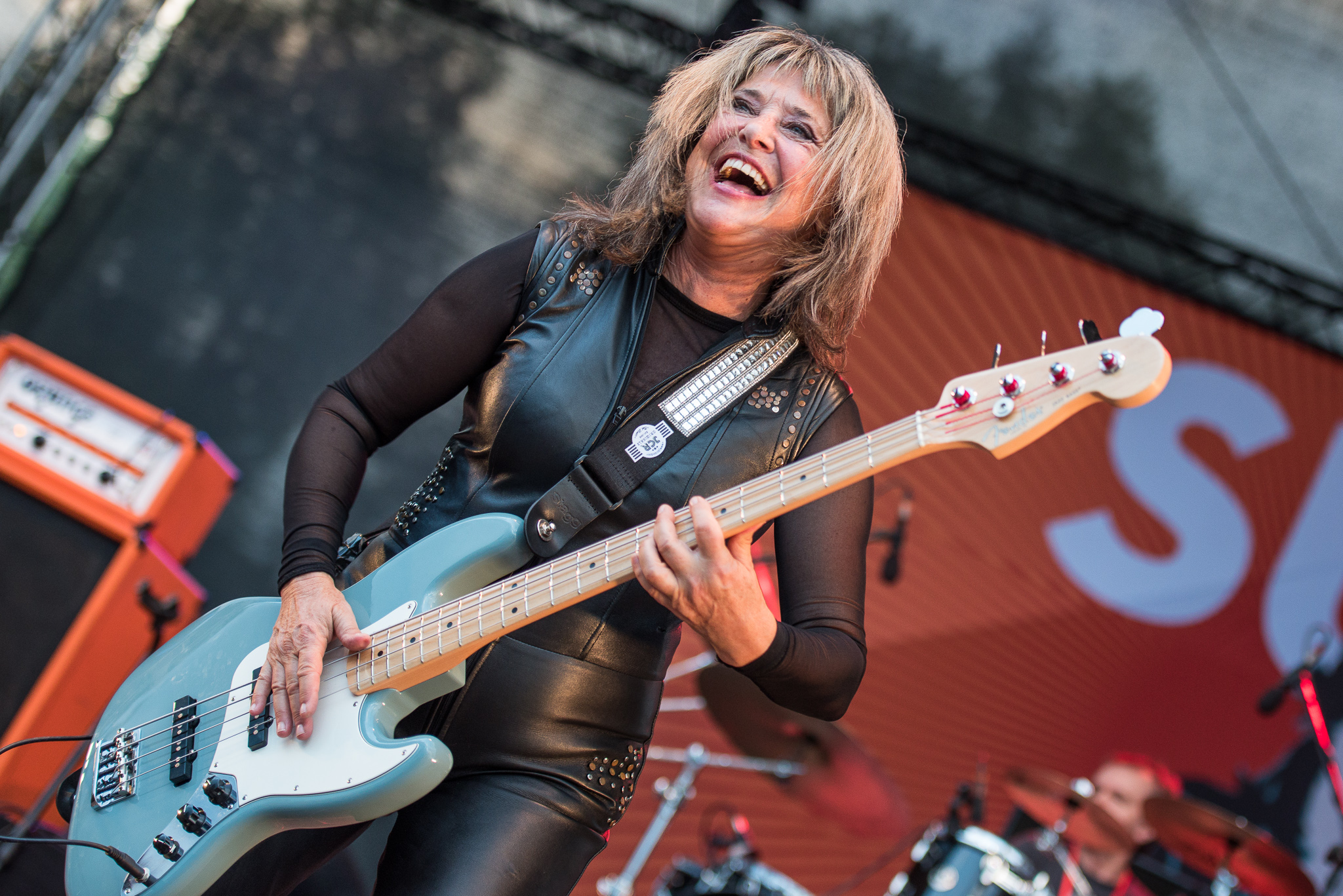
Quatro in 2017

Quatro's music covers several genres. Her primary genres are hard rock and glam rock. Academic Philip Auslander wrote that "she has appeared on occasion just as a bass player, not a singer, and [also] demonstrates her instrumental prowess with an extended bass guitar solo during her own concerts."

With the Pleasure Seekers, their musical styles and genres included power pop, garage rock and Motown. Quatro also performs musicals.

== Discography ==
- Suzi Quatro (1973)
- Quatro (1974)
- Your Mamma Won't Like Me (1975)
- Aggro-Phobia (1976)
- If You Knew Suzi... (1978)
- Suzi ... and Other Four Letter Words (1979)
- Rock Hard (1980)
- Main Attraction (1982)
- Annie Get Your Gun – 1986 London Cast (1986)
- Oh, Suzi Q. (1990)
- What Goes Around – Greatest & Latest (1995)
- Unreleased Emotion (1998)
- Free the Butterfly (1999)
- Back to the Drive (2006)
- In the Spotlight (2011)
- Quatro, Scott & Powell (2017)
- No Control (2019)
- The Devil in Me (2021)
- Face to Face (with KT Tunstall, 2023)
- Freedom (2026)

=== List of songs ===
see: List of songs by Suzi Quatro

== Filmography ==
=== Television ===
Acting

- Happy Days (seven episodes, 1977–1979)
- Minder (one episode "Dead Men Do Tell Tales", [series 3 episode 1] 1982)
- Dempsey and Makepeace (one episode, 1985)
- Absolutely Fabulous (one episode, 1994)
- Midsomer Murders (series 10 Episode 4 The Axeman Cometh, 2007)

Guest appearances

- Countdown (six episodes, 1997)
- Never Mind the Buzzcocks (4 episodes, 1999 – 2006)
- Rock School (one episode on series two, 2006)
- Trust Me – I'm a Beauty Therapist (in October 2006)
- Australian Idol (one episode as guest judge, 2009)
- RocKwiz (one episode as performer and quiz contestant, 2011)
- Spicks and Specks (one episode as quiz contestant, 2014)
- Disco (Quatro is in eleven episodes plus two retrospections of this German TV programme)

=== Film ===
- Bob the Builder – Built to Be Wild (voice of Rio Rogers, 2006)
- Suzi Q (Herself) 2019 Palstar Entertainment/Cadiz Music (directed by Liam Firmager)

== See also ==
- List of female rock singers
- Honorific nicknames in popular music
- Women in music
