= It Took Me So Long to Get Here, But Here I Am =

Single by KT Tunstall

from the album KIN
- Released: 20 August 2016
- Recorded: 2015–2016
- Length: 4:18
- Label: Caroline; Sony/ATV Music
- Songwriter: KT Tunstall
- Producer: Tony Hoffer

KT Tunstall singles chronology
"Love Is an Ocean" (2016)	"It Took Me So Long to Get Here, But Here I Am" (2016)	"The River" (2018)

"It Took Me So Long to Get Here, But Here I Am" is a 2016 single released by Scottish recording artist KT Tunstall as an iTunes promotional song from her fifth studio album KIN (2016), following the release of the single "Maybe It's a Good Thing". The song was released on 20 August 2016, and was Written solely by Tunstall, produced by Tony Hoffer.

== Background ==
Tunstall told American magazine American Songwriter that the song was the "mission statement" for the album Kin. She described the song as being an ode to herself, and recognising how proud she is of herself and accomplishments, adding that the song is "honest, vulnerable, strong, joyful, emotional and carefree". Tunstall said that song was her favourite from Kin, saying the song "reflects the mood and energy of the Kin album in one of the best ways". Additionally, the song has been described as The Daily Free Press as "capturing her experience as an artist to a T".

== Promotion ==
Along with "Suddenly I See", "It Took Me So Long to Get Here, But Here I Am" is regarded as Tunstall's favourite song to perform live. In November 2016, she performed the song live on KCRW Radio, and performed the song live at the 2017 Glastonbury Festival.

== Music video ==
A music video was released on 30 November 2016 by Tunstall herself, featuring Emily May Hunt, Hayley Jones, Misa Koide, and dancer Daniel Boham.

== Track listing ==
Digital download
No.	Title	Writer(s)	Producer(s)	Length
1.	"It Took Me So Long to Get Here, But Here I Am"	KT Tunstall	Tony Hoffer	4:01
Total length:				4:18
