= Kin (KT Tunstall album) =

Studio album by KT Tunstall
- Released: 9 September 2016
- Recorded: 2015–2016
- Studio: The Hobby Shop; The Motherbrain; Sunset Sound (Los Angeles)
- Genre: Pop rock; indie rock
- Length: 46:14
- Label: Caroline; Sony/ATV Music
- Producer: Tony Hoffer

KT Tunstall chronology
Golden State EP (2016)	Kin (2016)	Live at O2 Shepherds Bush Empire (2016)

Singles from Kin
- 1. "Maybe It's a Good Thing" Released: 15 July 2016; 2. "Hard Girls" Released: 1 September 2016; 3. "It Took Me So Long to Get Here, But Here I Am" Released: 29 November 2016; 4. "Two Way (promotional)" Released: 19 October 2017

Kin is the fifth studio album by Scottish singer-songwriter KT Tunstall. The release of the album marked the first release in a trilogy of albums to be released by Tunstall, the other two albums Wax and Nut were released in 2018 and 2022 respectively. Kin was released on 9 September 2016 worldwide, following up her previous album, the folk-toned Invisible Empire // Crescent Moon. It was preceded by the Golden State EP, which included one of the songs from the album, "Evil Eye". The album was produced by Tony Hoffer in a studio in Los Angeles.

Spawning a total of four singles – "Maybe It's a Good Thing", "Hard Girls", "It Took Me So Long to Get Here, But Here I Am" and "Two Way", the album peaked at number seven on both the Scottish Albums Chart and the UK Albums Chart, and debuted at number ninety-six in on the national albums charts in Switzerland.

== Background ==
Tunstall announced through Facebook in 2015 that a new record would be released in 2016. However, no title track, title album or release date was announced. She also revealed she was working with producer Tony Hoffer during a few chat live with the fans, where she even played live the song "Feel It All" and what was next going to be the promotional single "Evil Eye".

She recorded the album in a studio in Atwater Village, Los Angeles, a place that inspired her a lot of songs, according to her. After her fourth studio album Invisible Empire // Crescent Moon, two years before the album release, Tunstall had considered quitting the album music industry in order to write music for movies. She had entered the Sundance Institute's elite Film Composers Lab in order to give her career another direction. She admitted in an interview with Broadway World: "I stopped. I gave up. I didn't want to do it anymore."

Two years later, Kin had been written and recorded in Los Angeles and produced by Tony Hoffer. Prior to the release of the album, Tunstall claimed that she had "finally made peace with being a pop songwriter". She further added that "Kin is very much embracing my dharma as an artist, which is to write positive songs that have muscle, but also show their vulnerability."

Kin is the first album in a trilogy of records by Tunstall, which all cover the themes of "soul, body and mind."

== Composition and promotion ==
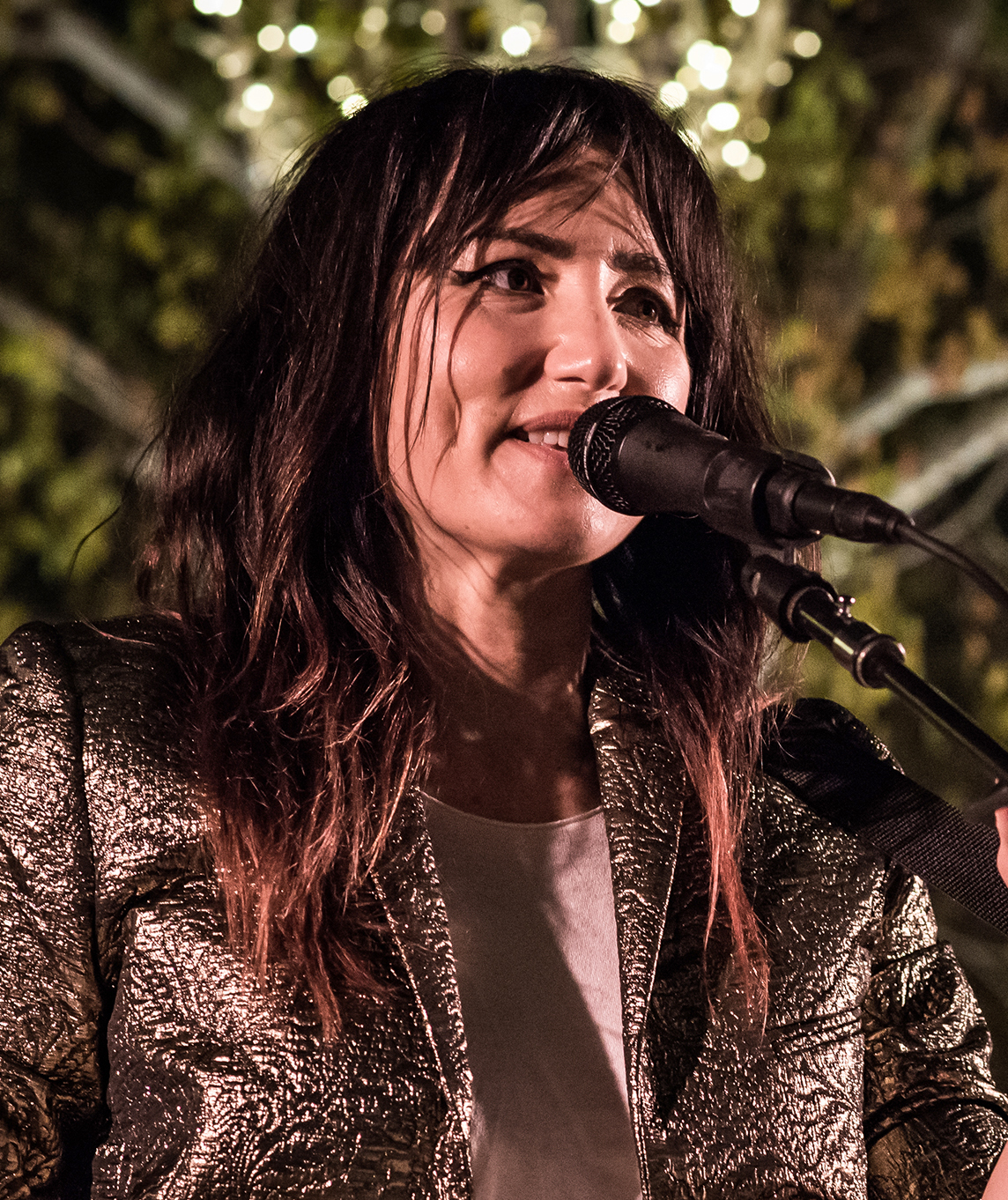
Tunstall performing in December 2016, three months following the albums release

The album is composed of eleven tracks. The lead single to be released from Kin, "Maybe It's a Good Thing", was released on 15 July, and a clip video was released on 1 August to promote the release of the single. Along with the single release, an acoustic version was released as well as a "Bit Funk Remix". The promotional single "Evil Eye" also features on the album. It was the very first song to be released from the album, but it was initially released as a single from the Golden State EP. Another promotional song was released on 19 August, It Took Me So Long to Get Here, But Here I Am. The song then became a single in November 2016. A music video was broadcast on 30 November 2016.

Following "Maybe It's a Good Thing", Tunstall announced that the first radio broadcast for her second single, "Hard Girls", would premiere on the Zoë Ball show for BBC Radio. A music video of the song, featuring Melanie C from the Spice Girls, was broadcast on 13 September 2016. The song "Love Is an Ocean" was also released as a single, with a video on 17 November. The song is a ballad that closes the album.

Another notable song is the duet, "Two Way", with 2016 Grammy Award nominee, James Bay. Bay and Tunstall met during a performance on the show broadcast by Jools Holland, Jools' Annual Hootenanny. Tunstall had read in an interview that he was a fan of hers, so she chatted with him and they decided to record a duet. Tunstall says in an interview with the UK newspaper Evening Standard that Bay is "one of the most talented new songwriters," and added "it was fantastic to work with him.". "Kin" is the title track of the album, and it is a ballad. Tunstall describes it as one of her favourite tracks, and wanted to name the album from this song.

== Commercial performance ==
Shortly after its release, Kin was ranked number 5 on the Official UK Albums Update midweek chart, and finally peaked at number 7 on the UK Albums Chart. Sales in the UK were better than her previous album Invisible Empire // Crescent Moon, which peaked at number 14 in the UK in 2013. It is Tunstall's fourth top 10 album in the UK after Eye to the Telescope and Drastic Fantastic peaked at number 3, and Tiger Suit at number 5. In her native Scotland, Kin also debuted at number seven on the Scottish Albums Charts, spending a total of seven weeks within the Scottish Top 100 Albums Chart.

Additionally, in the United Kingdom, it debuted at number ten on the Albums Downloads Chart, number nine on the Physical Albums Chart, number thirteen on the Vinyl Albums Chart, and nine on the Record Store Charts.

== Critical reception ==
Professional ratings
Aggregate scores
Source	Rating
AnyDecentMusic?	6.2/10
Metacritic	72/100
Review scores
Source	Rating
AllMusic	4/5 stars
Mojo	4/5 stars
Rolling Stone	3.5/5 stars
Yahoo!	(favourable)

At Metacritic, which assigns a normalised rating out of 100 to reviews from mainstream publications, the album has an average score of 72 based on 6 reviews, indicating "generally favorable reviews".

Among the positive reviews, Rolling Stone magazine wrote "At its best, the album is a power-pop gem. [...] Kin clicks when Tunstall's vocals dig deep on tracks like "Evil Eye" and "Run on Home," and when she and James Bay strike a sexy, slow-rolling groove on "Two Way," it makes an awfully good case for going back to Cali." The magazine rewarded the album with 3,5 stars out of 5. Yahoo! also gave a good review of the album, stating "Embracing her rock-pop gifts, Tunstall seems at peace — and we're the beneficiaries. It may have taken her long to get here but KIN shows it was worth it." AllMusic, who gave the album four stars, wrote "What gives Kin its weight is Tunstall's craft. Invisible Empire // Crescent Moon proved that she could turn inward and be gripping, but by turning that aesthetic inside out -- this is an album about embracing the outside world -- she's every bit as compelling. "

The Irish Times however criticised the album and Tunstall for losing "some of her va-va-voom" and saying further "The Scot's sixth album is a departure from the melancholy, bare-boned folk of her last (double) album, Invisible Empire // Crescent Moon, but that's not necessarily a good thing."

== Track listing ==
No.	Title	Music	Producer(s)	Length
1.	"Hard Girls"	KT Tunstall	Tony Hoffer	3:14
2.	"Turned a Light On"	Tunstall	Hoffer	4:34
3.	"Maybe It's a Good Thing"	Tunstall	Hoffer	4:01
4.	"Evil Eye"	Tunstall	Hoffer	3:34
5.	"It Took Me So Long to Get Here, But Here I Am"	Tunstall	Hoffer	4:18
6.	"On My Star"	Tunstall	Hoffer	4:16
7.	"Two Way" (featuring James Bay)	Tunstall, James Bay	Hoffer	4:53
8.	"Run On Home"	Tunstall	Hoffer	4:27
9.	"KIN"	Tunstall	Hoffer	4:17
10.	"Everything Has Its Shape"	Tunstall	Hoffer	4:23
11.	"Love Is an Ocean"	Tunstall	Hoffer	4:17
Total length:				46:14

== Personnel ==
- KT Tunstall - vocals, guitars, keyboards, bass, programming, flute, synths
- Tony Hoffer - guitar, programming, synths, bass
- James Bay - vocals (7), guitar (7)
- Dave MacLean - programming, organ
- Denny Weston Jr. - drums, percussion
- Dave Palmer - organ, synths, keyboards, synth bass
- Joseph Karnes - bass
- Charlotte Hatherley - electric guitar, ambient guitar
- David Campbell - strings arrangement (9)

== Charts ==
Chart (2016)	Peak position
Swiss Albums (Swiss Hitparade)	96
Scottish Albums (Official Charts)	7
UK Albums (Official Charts)	7
UK Album Downloads (Official Charts)	10
UK Physical Albums (Official Charts)	9
UK Vinyl Albums (Official Charts)	13
UK Official Record Store Chart	9
US Top Album Sales (Billboard)	72
US Top Rock Albums (Billboard)	29
US Independent Albums (Billboard)	23

== Release history ==
Region	Date	Label	Format
Worldwide	9 September 2016	Caroline, Sony/ATV Music	CD, digital download CD+DVD
