= No Control (Suzi Quatro album) =

Studio album by Suzi Quatro
- Released: March 29, 2019
- Genre: Rock
- Length: 43:51
- Label: Steamhammer
- Producer: Richard Tuckey

Suzi Quatro chronology
Quatro, Scott & Powell (2017)	No Control (2019)	The Devil in Me (2021)

No Control is the sixteenth solo studio album by American musician Suzi Quatro, released on March 29, 2019, through Steamhammer. The album was written mainly by Quatro and former husband and songwriting partner Len Tuckey, the first album to feature the duo's compositions since Quatro's 1982 album Main Attraction. Its release was preceded by the lead single "No Soul / No Control".

== Critical reception ==
Professional ratings
Review scores
Source	Rating
Classic Pop	6/10

Classic Pop felt that the album is "at its best when it's rawest", calling "Don't Do Me No Wrong" "a dirty blues jam whose two-note bass riff is spruced up by rowdy blasts of harmonica" and opining that the closing track "Going Down Blues" "suggests [Quatro's] not going down without a fight". An overview of Quatro's albums by Ian Fortnam of Classic Rock stated that No Control "boasts an engaging freshness that gives the distinct impression of a new beginning rather than a swansong" as well as a "cohesive modern production [that] makes sense of a characteristic mixture of styles".

== Track listing ==
No Control track listing
No.	Title	Length
1.	"No Soul / No Control"	3:47
2.	"Going Home"	3:44
3.	"Strings"	4:15
4.	"Love Isn't Fair"	3:04
5.	"Macho Man"	3:43
6.	"Easy Pickings"	4:26
7.	"Bass Line"	4:33
8.	"Don't Do Me Wrong"	3:43
9.	"Heavy Duty"	3:08
10.	"I Can Teach You to Fly"	4:26
11.	"Going Down Blues"	5:03
Total length:		43:51

== Charts ==
Chart performance for No Control
Chart (2019)	Peak position
Austrian Albums (Ö3 Austria)	39
German Albums (Offizielle Top 100)	31
Swiss Albums (Schweizer Hitparade)	42
UK Independent Albums (OCC)	50
