= Maybe It's a Good Thing =

Single by KT Tunstall

from the album KIN
- Released: 15 July 2016
- Recorded: 2015–2016
- Length: 4:01
- Label: Caroline; Sony/ATV Music
- Songwriter: KT Tunstall
- Producer: Tony Hoffer

KT Tunstall singles chronology
"Evil Eye" (2016)	"Maybe It's a Good Thing" (2016)	"Hard Girls" (2016)

"Maybe It's a Good Thing" is a 2016 single released by Scottish recording artist KT Tunstall, released as the lead single from her fifth studio album, KIN (2016), on 15 July 2016, right after the Golden State EP and its promotional single "Evil Eye". Written solely by Tunstall, it was produced by Tony Hoffer.

== Composition ==
"Maybe It's a Good Thing" was written by Tunstall in Los Angeles, like most of the album. Tunstall stated that the song was about dealing with hard things in the past, and seeing them a positive experience. The song marks a different sound than her previous albums Invisible Empire // Crescent Moon which was folk, and Tiger Suit, which was electronic music. This time, it is a pop song. Tunstall stated in an interview with Entertainment Weekly : "The truth is, I’ve finally made peace with being a pop songwriter".

== Promotion ==
Tunstall played the song, acoustic and live, during her intervention at the Oxford Union on 20 July 2016. She also played it during the Cambridge Folk Festival 2016.

== Music video ==
The clip of "Maybe It's a Good Thing" was released on 1 August 2016 through Vevo. Yoni Weisberg directed the video (he has previously worked with Band of Skulls and Courtney Barnett). The website Entertainment Weekly premiered the video along with an article, stating the video is a "kaleidoscopic confetti, diving into a psychedelic potpourri of rapid fire visuals".

In the music video, Tunstall is dancing in different, colorful outfits. She says the music seen is all about dancing; "I thought my dancing was really bad, [but] I’m a big fan of the band Jungle from London, and they always do these awesome choreographed dance videos. I love dancing, no matter how I look, and that’s how I want this whole album to make people feel, so I just did what felt good."

== Track listing ==
Digital download
No.	Title	Writer(s)	Producer(s)	Length
1.	"Maybe It's a Good Thing"	KT Tunstall	Tony Hoffer	4:01
2.	"Maybe It's a Good Thing" (Acoustic version)	KT Tunstall	Tony Hoffer	4:51
3.	"Maybe It's a Good Thing" (Bit Funk Remix)	KT Tunstall	Tony Hoffer	4:29
Total length:				4:01
