= Golden State EP =

EP by KT Tunstall
- Released: 16 June 2016
- Genre: Pop
- Length: 14:55
- Label: Caroline; Sony/ATV Music
- Producer: Tony Hoffer

KT Tunstall chronology
Live Islington Assembly Hall (2013)	Golden State EP (2016)	KIN (2016)

Singles from Golden State EP
- 1. "Evil Eye" Released: 16 June 2016

Golden State EP is a 2016 EP studio release from KT Tunstall preceding the release of KIN, recorded in Los Angeles.

The EP contains the following tracks: the lead single "Evil Eye", the soundtrack song "All or Nothing" written for the French TV show Sam, "The Healer", and a remix of "Evil Eye" by Django Django. On an interview, Tunstall describes the EP in these words: "This is an album all about joy, although some of these songs are like cats, they're really furry and sweet and then they scratch you, and they won't let you put a leash on them, ever."

The songs "All or Nothing" and "The Healer" are not on the album KIN. They were only released on the EP. A new version of "The Healer" is included on the follow-up of KIN, WAX, under the title "The Healer (Redux)", with a more rock-oriented sound.

== Track listing ==
All tracks are written by KT Tunstall

No.	Title	Length
1.	"Evil Eye"	3:34
2.	"All or Nothing"	3:36
3.	"The Healer"	3:39
4.	"Evil Eye" (Django Django's Mad Drums Remix)	3:56
Total length:		14:55

Barnes & Noble Exclusive CD bonus track
No.	Title	Length
5.	"Bad Dream"	3:43
