= Evil Eye (KT Tunstall song) =

Single by KT Tunstall

from the album KIN, Golden State EP
- Released: 16 June 2016
- Recorded: 2015–2016
- Length: 3:34 (album version); 3:49 (radio edit)
- Label: Caroline; Sony/ATV Music
- Songwriter: KT Tunstall
- Producer: Tony Hoffer

KT Tunstall singles chronology
"Come On, Get In" (2013)	"Evil Eye" (2016)	"Maybe It's a Good Thing" (2016)

"Evil Eye" is a song by the Scottish recording artist KT Tunstall. It was released as the UK first promotional single off her fifth studio album KIN. The song was released at the same time as the Golden State EP along with the songs "All or Nothing", "The Healer", and a remix of it. It was released through iTunes on 16 June 2016.

Tunstall worked with Tony Hoffer on the song. A music video was released on 20 June 2016 on Vevo, it was directed by Tunstall herself. It has also been played live in the Billboard building.

== Track listing ==
Digital download
No.	Title	Writer(s)	Producer(s)	Length
1.	"Evil Eye"	KT Tunstall	Tony Hoffer	3:34
Total length:				3:34
