= Wax (KT Tunstall album) =

2018 album by KT Tunstall

Studio album by KT Tunstall
- Released: 5 October 2018
- Recorded: 2017–2018
- Studios: Sausage Studios (London); Bradland Studios (London)
- Genres: Pop rock; indie rock
- Length: 41:36
- Labels: Virgin, Rostrum Records
- Producers: Nick McCarthy; Sebastian Kellig; Tim Bran; Roy Kerr

KT Tunstall chronology
KT Tunstall's Acoustic Extravaganza 2 (2017)	Wax (2018)	Live at the Barrowland Ballroom Glasgow 2019 (2019)

Singles from WAX
- 1. "The River" Released: 23 August 2018; 2. "Human Being" Released: 19 October 2018; 3. "Little Red Thread" Released: 7 May 2019

Wax is the sixth studio album by Scottish singer-songwriter KT Tunstall, and the second album in the "soul, body and mind" trilogy. It was released on 5 October 2018, following up the first album of the trilogy, Kin. The first single from the album is "The River", released on 23 August 2018.

== Background ==
Tunstall announced the release of a new album called Wax on 23 August 2018. In early 2018, Tunstall announced she had started working with Nick McCarthy from the Brit band Franz Ferdinand, who is one of the co-writers and producers of the new album. She also announced that the album would be the second of a trilogy following the themes of soul, body and mind. On naming the album, Tunstall said that "Wax describes very physical things to me. Bees, candlelight, music being pressed onto old wax cylinders, statues of human beings that look so incredibly lifelike and almost have a life-glow to them, and of course wax being produced inside your own head".

About the sound of the album, Tunstall said she wanted it to be an electric guitar record before she started the writing process. "It had to be visceral, about the physical, and the weight of that, and the obstacles of that. It's a record about human-ness, which we so often just write off as 'flaws'".

== Singles and songs ==
The album is composed of eleven tracks. The lead single is "The River", and it was released on 23 August 2018, along with a lyrics video. An official music video was released on 11 September. Along with the single release, an acoustic version and an "Alexander Bradley Remix" were released. Tunstall stated she wrote the song years ago, during a tour while promoting her second album Drastic Fantastic.

"Human Being" was released as the second single on 19 October 2018, along with a lyrics video. Its official video was released on 9 November 2018, featuring eight-year-old Canadian martial artist Eccaia Sampson.

The album also includes a new version of "The Healer", which was originally included on the Golden State EP. The new version is included under the title "The Healer (Redux)".

"Poison in Your Cup" is an old song that Tunstall had written years ago and played during some gigs. Finally, the track made its way on Wax.

Another notable song is "The Night that Bowie Died", which, as the title says, is a tribute to David Bowie that Tunstall and McCarthy wrote together. Tunstall stated that writing the song "was a real moment where Nick and I looked each other in the eye and knew we were making special work together. It got us both very emotional, and we had to take a minute to get our shit back together. So that song is a real vanguard."

== Critical reception ==
Professional ratings
Aggregate scores
Source	Rating
Metacritic	75/100
Review scores
Source	Rating
Albumism	5/5 stars
AllMusic	4/5 stars
Exclaim!	7/10
Paste	3.5/5 stars
The Times	3/5 stars

Wax received generally positive reviews by critics. Aggregating website Metacritic reports a normalised rating of 75% based on four critic reviews and AnyDecentMusic? reports a rating of 6.3 based on six reviews. Before the album's release, Wax was a part of Billboard's most anticipated albums of Fall 2018. The article calls the lead single "The River" a "roaring single".

Of the songs, "The Mountain" appears as a standout, being described by Neil Z. Yeung from AllMusic as "slinky, intergalactic exploration that sounds unlike anything Tunstall has ever done", while the website The Skinny picked the song in her Top 3. Also, the last two songs "The Night That Bowie Died" and "Tiny Love" were mentioned in many reviews as standouts. The Arts Desk writes about it: 'the final tracks "The Night That Bowie Died" and "Tiny Love", you could hardly ask for a better listen for those first nights of putting the heating on as autumn sets in.'

== Track listing ==
No.	Title	Writer(s)	Producer(s)	Length
1.	"Little Red Thread"	KT Tunstall; Angelo Petraglia	Nick McCarthy; Sebastian Kellig; Tim Bran; Roy Kerr	3:26
2.	"Human Being"	Tunstall; McCarthy	McCarthy; Kellig; Bran; Kerr	3:29
3.	"The River"	Tunstall; Martin Terefe	McCarthy; Kellig; Bran; Kerr	3:40
4.	"The Mountain"	Tunstall; McCarthy	McCarthy; Kellig; Bran; Kerr	3:57
5.	"The Healer (Redux)"	Tunstall	McCarthy; Kellig	3:48
6.	"Dark Side of Me"	Tunstall; Terefe; Tyler Connolly	McCarthy; Kellig; Bran; Kerr	3:36
7.	"Poison in Your Cup"	Tunstall	McCarthy; Kellig	3:48
8.	"Backlash & Vinegar"	Tunstall	McCarthy; Kellig	4:06
9.	"In This Body"	Tunstall; Bran; Kerr; Karen Poole^{[a]}	Bran; Kerr	3:21
10.	"The Night That Bowie Died"	Tunstall; McCarthy; Kellig	McCarthy; Kellig	3:49
11.	"Tiny Love"	Tunstall; Terefe	McCarthy; Kellig	4:36
Total length:				41:36

HMV Scotland special edition bonus tracks
No.	Title	Writer(s)	Producer(s)	Length
12.	"John the Conqueror"	Tunstall; Greg Kurstin	McCarthy; Kellig	2:51
13.	"Throw Down Boy"	Tunstall; McCarthy; Kellig	McCarthy; Kellig	3:07

=== Notes ===
- ^{^[a]} Despite not being credited as songwriter of "In This Body" in the album's liner notes, Karen Poole is listed as songwriter by ASCAP and BMI.

== Personnel ==
- KT Tunstall – vocals, guitars, keyboards, synths, piano, flute
- Nick McCarthy – bass, synths, vocals, guitars
- Tim Bran – synths, keyboards, programming
- Roy Kerr – keyboards, programming
- Leo Abrahams – guitars
- Denny Weston Jr. – drums, percussion
- Charlotte Hatherley – guitars
- Hinako Omori – keyboards, Wurlitzer
- Sophie Solomon – strings
- James Valentine – backing vocals (track 3)

== Charts ==
Chart (2018)	Peak position
Scottish Albums (Official Charts)	6
UK Albums (Official Charts)	15
US Billboard Top Independent Albums	30
