= KT Tunstall =

Scottish singer-songwriter (born 1975)

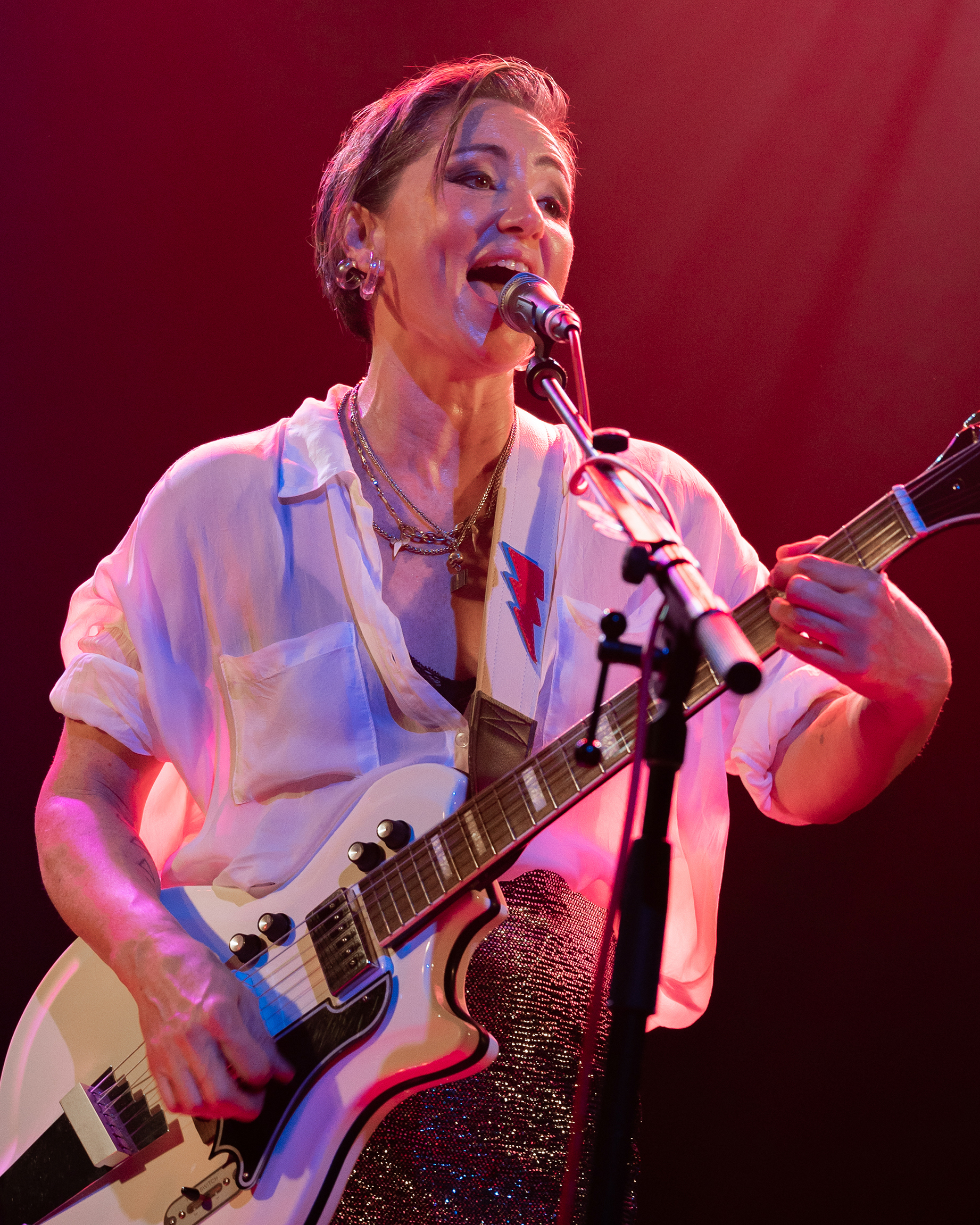
- Tunstall performing in October 2023

Background information
- Born: Kate Victoria Tunstall; 23 June 1975 (age 51); Edinburgh, Scotland
- Origin: St Andrews, Fife, Scotland
- Genres: Alternative rock; folk rock; pop rock; indie rock; folktronica
- Instruments: Vocals; guitar
- Years active: 2000–present
- Labels: Relentless; Blue Note; Universal; Caroline; Sony Music Publishing
- Website: kttunstall.com

Kate Victoria "KT" Tunstall (born 23 June 1975) is a Scottish singer-songwriter and musician. She first gained attention with a 2004 live solo performance of her song "Black Horse and the Cherry Tree" on Later... with Jools Holland and has subsequently also appeared in two episodes of the comedy series This Is Jinsy on Sky Atlantic. In 2025 it was estimated that Tunstall's accumulated record sales totalled seven million. Her accolades include a Q Award, European Border Breakers Award, two Ivor Novello Awards, a UK Music Video Award, and a BRIT Award for Best British Female Artist. Additionally, she has been nominated for a Grammy Award, Mercury Prize, World Music Award, and a Hollywood Music in Media Award.

The title of her debut studio album, Eye to the Telescope, was inspired by her childhood experiences at her father's physics laboratory at the University of St Andrews. Released in 2004, the album was a strong seller worldwide, selling over five million copies internationally, and ultimately became the 51st–best-selling album of the 2000s decade in the United Kingdom. The single, "Black Horse and the Cherry Tree", was given the Q Magazine Award for Best Track in 2005, and "Suddenly I See" won the Ivor Novello Award for Best Song in 2006. "Suddenly I See" became a popular hit and was featured in the hit film The Devil Wears Prada and adopted as a campaign song for the Hillary Clinton 2008 presidential campaign. Her second album, Drastic Fantastic (2007), features some tracks written prior to the release of Eye to the Telescope and was supported by the singles "Hold On", "Saving My Face", and "If Only". Her third album, Tiger Suit, was released in 2010.

In April 2013, she released "Feel It All" as the lead single from her fourth album, Invisible Empire // Crescent Moon (2013). From 2016 until 2022, she released three albums as a trilogy – Kin (2016), Wax (2018), and Nut (2022). Singles released during this period include "Maybe It's a Good Thing" and "It Took Me So Long to Get Here, But Here I Am". In 2023 she partnered with American singer and bassist Suzi Quatro on the collaborative album Face to Face.

== Early life and education ==
Tunstall was born to a half-Chinese, half-Scottish mother, Carol Ann Orr, who was from Hong Kong, and a Northern Irish father, John Corrigan, from Belfast. Her parents met while her mother was working as a waitress in the Penthouse bar in Edinburgh, where her father was a barman. She was born at Edinburgh's Western General Hospital and at 18 days old was placed for adoption by her mother with a family in St Andrews, Fife, Scotland. She never met her biological father.

Her adoptive father, David Tunstall, was a physics lecturer at the University of St Andrews, and her adoptive mother, Rosemarie Tunstall, was a primary school teacher. They already had adopted another child who became her elder brother Joe, and went on to have another son, Dan. Tunstall has said: "My earliest memories are Californian", from a sabbatical that her father took at the University of California, Los Angeles, in 1979. She was musically oriented and her parents supported her interest. She recollected that she asked for a piano when she was four.

Tunstall grew up in St Andrews, Fife, attending Lawhead Primary, then Madras College in St. Andrews and the High School of Dundee, but she spent her last year of high school in the United States at the Kent School, a selective boarding school in Kent, Connecticut. Tunstall studied at Royal Holloway, University of London. She graduated with a Bachelor of Arts in Drama & Music in 1996. Royal Holloway conferred an honorary doctorate in science on her in 2011 for her work on environmental issues as a musician.

== Music career ==
=== Career beginnings (2000–2004) ===
Throughout Tunstall's twenties she played in indie music bands including Elia Drew and Tomoko. She focused on songwriting, as well as performing with members of the fledgling Fence Collective. Tunstall lived with Gordon Anderson of the Beta Band and the Aliens, whom the song "Funnyman" on her second studio album Drastic Fantastic (2007) is about. She toured with the klezmer band Oi Va Voi and stayed with them while they were making their second studio album, Laughter Through Tears (2003).

When British label Relentless Records put forward an independent offer, Tunstall opted to sign with a U.S. major label instead. However, when that deal did not work out, she decided to go with Relentless. Although Relentless co-founder Shabs Jobanputra recognised the potential in the quality of Tunstall's voice and songs in the early 2000s, his assessment then was that she "wasn't ready yet", and so together with Tunstall's manager, Jobanputra discussed "the process of how we saw her happening and how we would work, why we thought the songs were great, why we thought she was great, and why it could really work if we took enough time."

=== Eye to the Telescope and breakthrough (2004–2007) ===
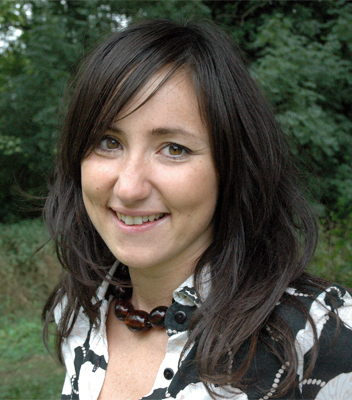
Tunstall in November 2005

Tunstall's debut studio album, Eye to the Telescope, was first released in late 2004, entering the UK Albums Chart at number 73. Tunstall's first appearance of note was a solo performance of her folk blues song "Black Horse and the Cherry Tree" on Later... with Jools Holland. She had only 24 hours to prepare after scheduled performer Nas cancelled. She performed as a one-person band using a guitar, a tambourine, and a loop pedal.

Shortly after the Later appearance, Eye to the Telescope was re-released and shot up the British charts, peaking at No. 3 and certified 5× Platinum by the BPI; it was nominated for the 2005 Mercury Music Prize. The album was released in the U.S. on 7 February 2006. On the UK Singles Chart, "Black Horse and the Cherry Tree" made it to No. 28, and on the US Billboard Hot 100 it charted at No. 20. The next release from the album in the United Kingdom was "Other Side of the World", whilst "Suddenly I See" was released in the United States and used in the opening credits of the film The Devil Wears Prada (2006), as well as in the television series Ugly Betty. Further singles released from the album were "Under the Weather" and "Another Place to Fall", which were also successful.

Tunstall released an acoustic collection album on 15 May 2006, KT Tunstall's Acoustic Extravaganza, which was first available only via mail order from her website. The album was re-released in stores worldwide in October 2006. Tunstall's North American break came when American Idol contestant Katharine McPhee contacted her asking to use "Black Horse and the Cherry Tree" as her choice for a Billboard-themed week. At the time, the song was No. 79 on the Billboard charts. Tunstall had not been shy with her opinions regarding shows like Idol, saying "The major problem I have is that it's completely controlled. They're told what to say. They're told how to sing." She chose to license the song as she felt that "no one on that show told Katharine McPhee to sing my song because no one knew it". Tunstall's belief was correct—the song was suggested to McPhee by Billboard columnist and author Fred Bronson. The song immediately jumped to No. 23 on the Billboard charts the week following McPhee's performance.

Tunstall sang with Scottish band Travis on their fifth studio album, The Boy with No Name (2007), on the track "Under the Moonlight", a song written by Susie Hug, formerly of Katydids.

=== Drastic Fantastic and Tiger Suit (2007–2012) ===
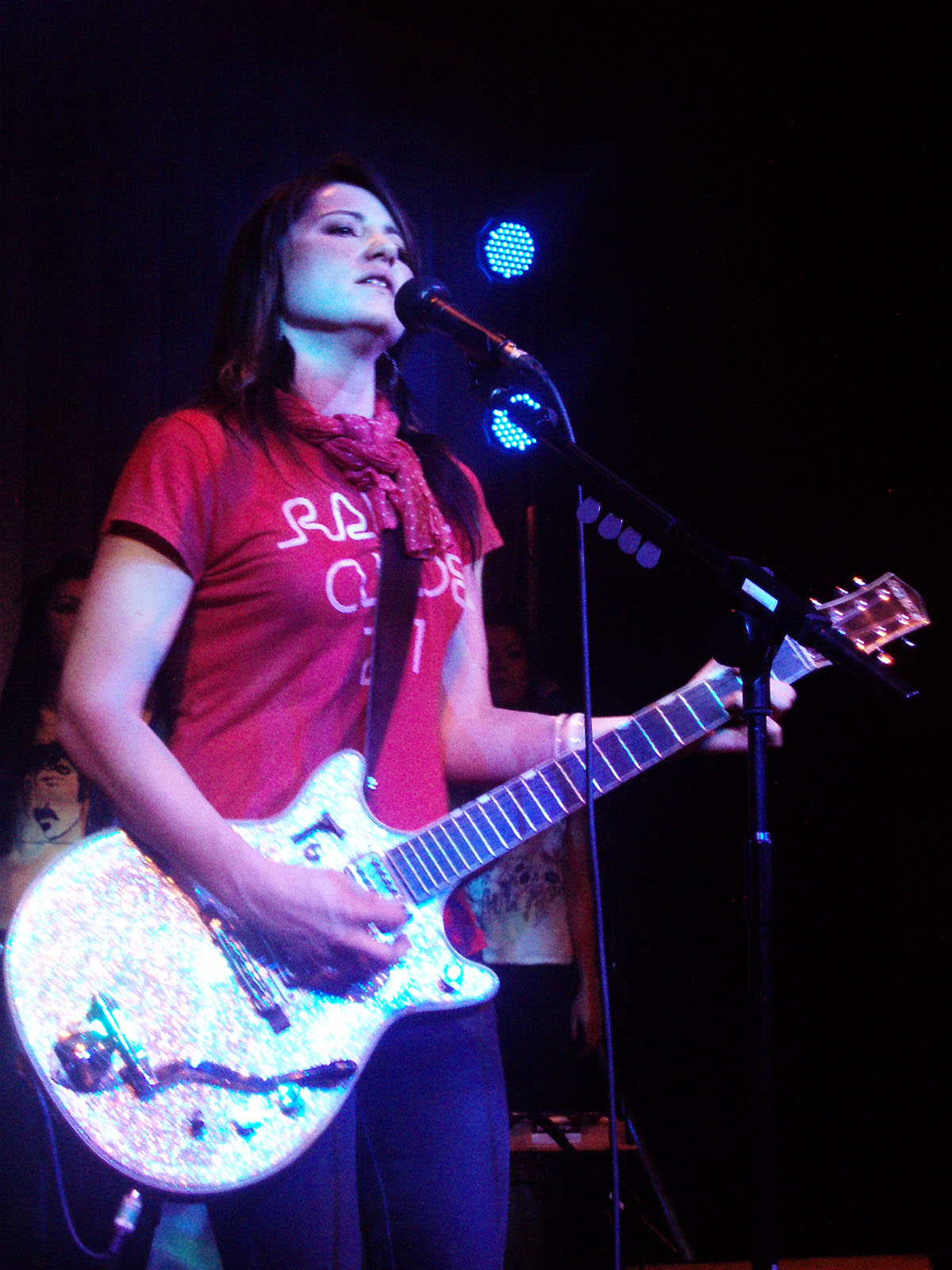
Tunstall performing at AIR Studios, London 2008

Tunstall's second studio album, Drastic Fantastic, premiered on 3 September 2007 in Scotland, followed a week later on 10 September 2007 with the London release for Britain and then on 18 September 2007 in the U.S. In its first week Drastic Fantastic reached No. 1 on the Scottish Album Charts, No. 3 on the British Charts, and No. 9 in the American Charts. The album's lead single, "Hold On", was released in the UK in August 2007, debuting at No. 34 before peaking at No. 21. The song was also very successful in certain European nations, peaking at No. 19 in Italy, No. 19 in Norway, No. 26 in Switzerland, and No. 39 in Ireland. The album's second single, "Saving My Face", was released in December 2007. The song did not reach the UK Top 40 Singles Charts but did peak at No. 50, managing three weeks on the UK Charts. Despite missing the UK Top 40, the song made the Top 40 in Italy at No. 23 and in Switzerland peaking at No. 93. The album's third single and final worldwide single, "If Only", was released in March 2008, becoming the second single from the album to miss the UK Top 40; it managed to reach No. 45.

In the United States, "Hold On" was moderately successful, charting at No. 95 on the U.S. Billboard Pop Chart and No. 27 on the U.S. Billboard Adult Top 40. However, it failed to make an impact inside the Billboard Hot 100, placing at No. 104. Drastic Fantastic became one of her best charting albums to date: No. 3 on the UK Album Charts, topping the Scottish Album Charts, and making the top ten on the US Billboard 200 album charts at No. 9. Further single releases from Drastic Fantastic, "Saving My Face" and "If Only", were moderately successful, charting at No. 50 and No. 45 on the UK Singles Charts, respectively.

Tunstall commented that the photograph for the album cover was influenced by the rock star Suzi Quatro. On 5 October 2007, the U.S. discount department store chain Target, in association with NBC, released a special KT Tunstall Christmas EP on CD, Sounds of the Season: The KT Tunstall Holiday Collection. On 10 December 2007, it was released in Europe through Relentless under the title Have Yourself a Very KT Christmas.

In 2008 Tunstall recorded a song for the double album Songs for Survival in support of the indigenous rights organisation Survival International. In a video for Survival International, she speaks of music as being a force for good and of what she learned about tribal people on this project. She also discusses various issues concerning our culture of consumption and greed, our relation to the earth, and the importance of indigenous rights in the world today. Tunstall also worked with Suzanne Vega on Vega's seventh studio album Beauty & Crime (2007), singing backing vocals on the songs "Zephyr and I" and "Frank and Ava". It was revealed in the booklet by Vega that the two never met in person during the process of making the album.

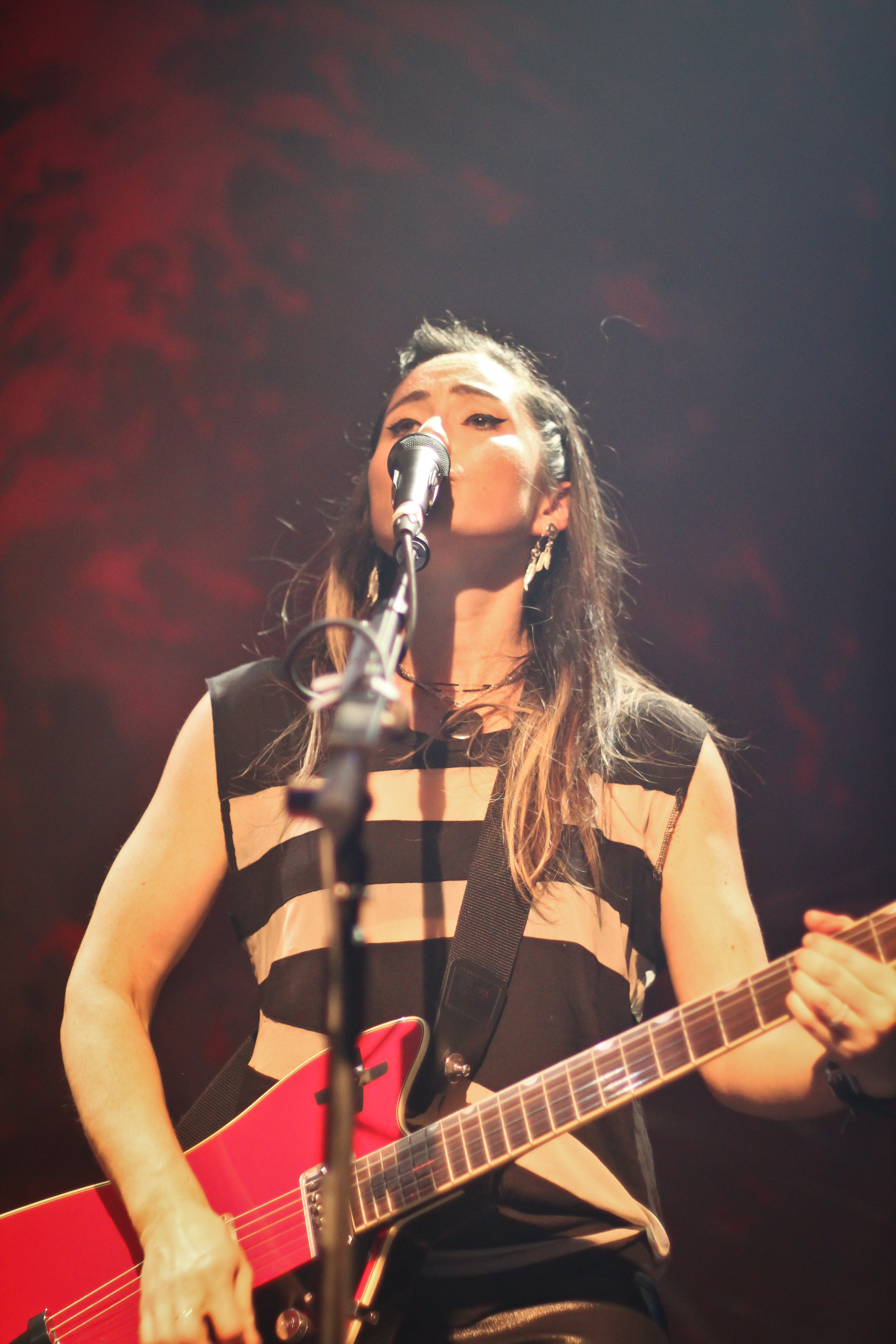
Tunstall performing at The Venue in Vancouver, Canada, 2011

Over the Christmas holidays in 2008, Tunstall joined Neil Finn's 7 Worlds Collide line-up in Auckland, New Zealand, to record a charity studio album for Oxfam. The album was recorded in Finn's New Zealand studio over three weeks and featured all-new material, with singing and songwriting contributions divided amongst the group. Most of the participants from the original 2001 7 Worlds Collide line-up returned, along with several new additions including Jeff Tweedy, Glenn Kotche, John Stirratt and Pat Sansone of Wilco, New Zealand songwriters Don McGlashan and Bic Runga, and Finn's son Elroy Finn. The album, titled The Sun Came Out, was released on 31 August 2009.

On 11 February 2010 the Daily Record reported that Tunstall had recorded her new album in Berlin's Hansa Studios. Located near the former site of the Berlin Wall, the studio is where legendary albums including David Bowie's "Heroes" (1977) and U2's Achtung Baby (1991) were recorded. Tunstall said, "I had an amazing three weeks recording in Hansa in Berlin in January and am finishing it all off in London." Her third studio album, titled Tiger Suit, was released in the United Kingdom on 27 September 2010 and in the United States on 5 October 2010.

Tunstall said that Tiger Suit's title was inspired by a recurring dream she had before discovering that 2010 was the Year of the Tiger in the Chinese zodiac. In the dream, she sees a tiger in her garden and goes outside to stroke it. She returns indoors and is seized by the fear that she could have been killed. Over the years, it has occurred to her that the reason the tiger responded so passively is that she herself was disguised as a tiger, wearing a tiger suit. She said that while writing and recording the album, she experimented with a new sound she called "Nature techno", which mixes organic instrumentation with electronic and dance textures, similar in style to the work of Icelandic singer Björk. At a media showcase in London, Tunstall offered an unusual description of the songs from her forthcoming third album: "Like Eddie Cochran working with Leftfield".

The album's first single was "Fade Like a Shadow" in the United States and "(Still a) Weirdo" in the United Kingdom. Tunstall has also been a panelist on the BBC Two comedy music show Never Mind the Buzzcocks, first on series 21 episode 8 (2008), and on series 24 episode 10 (2012).

=== Invisible Empire // Crescent Moon (2013–2014) ===
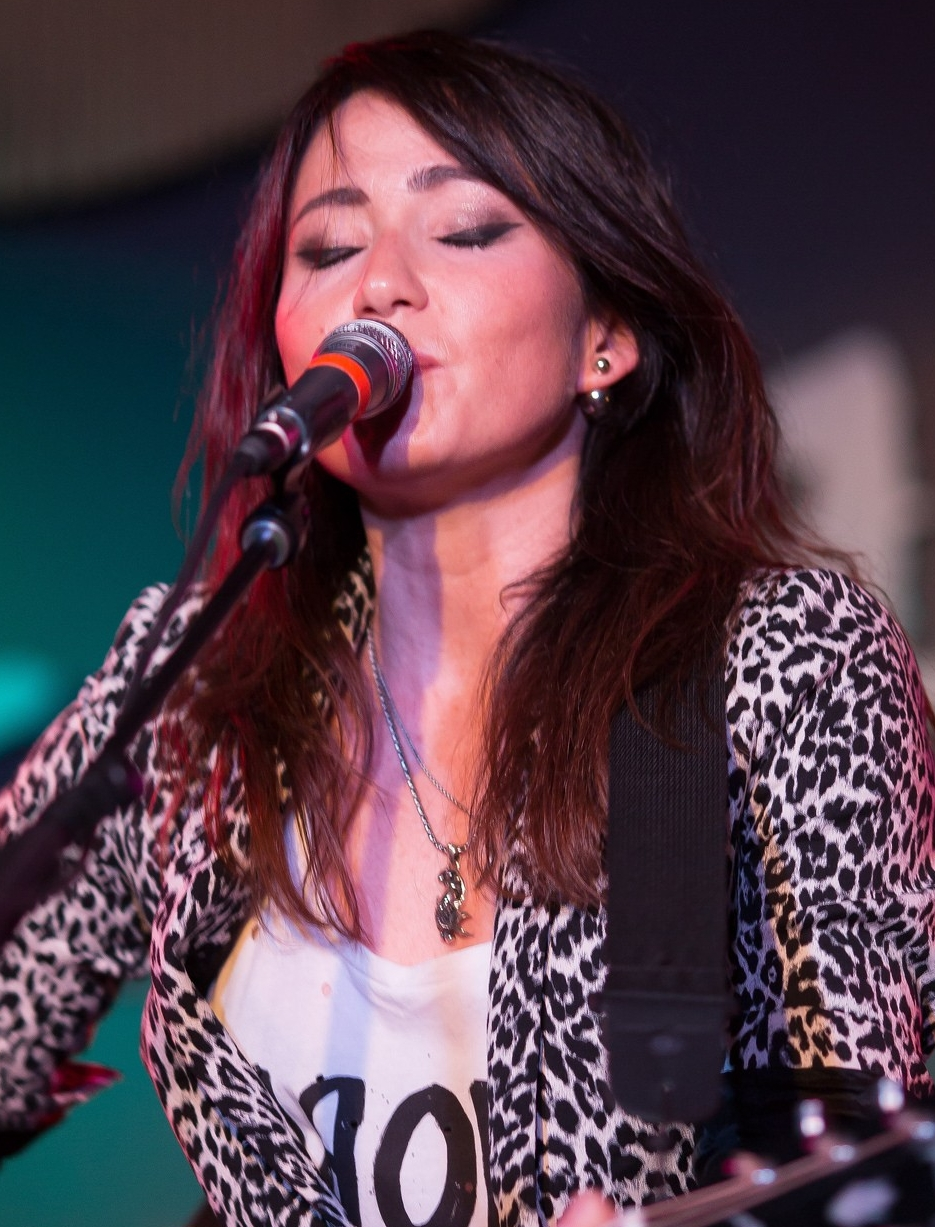
Tunstall performing live in 2014

On 20 March 2013 Tunstall announced that her fourth studio album would be titled Invisible Empire // Crescent Moon, which has since been considered her best by many critics and her most melancholy album to date. The title reflects the two batches of songs she recorded with singer-songwriter and producer Howe Gelb in 2012. Invisible Empire, recorded in April, is the melancholic half that deals with her father's death and the theme of mortality, while Crescent Moon, recorded in November 2012, features songs that are more ethereal. These 13 songs formed an album that Tunstall described as "from the heart," inspired by her divorce from Luke Bullen and her father's death.

Invisible Empire // Crescent Moon was released in the United Kingdom on 10 June 2013, while it was released in Germany and Australia on 7 June, in Japan and Canada on 11 June, and 6 August in the United States. Meanwhile, the lead single, "Feel It All", was released worldwide on 10 June, and its music video premiered on 29 April. In its first week of release, the album entered the UK charts at No. 14 and it was a modest commercial success in Europe: it peaked at No. 52 in Belgium, No. 84 in the Netherlands, No. 240 in France, No. 7 in Scotland, and No. 56 in Switzerland.

In 2013 Tunstall teamed up again with Gelb in Tucson, Arizona, for his twenty-first album The Coincidentalist, and they recorded a duet, "The 3 Deaths of Lucky". She appeared on the second episode of This Is Jinsy on 5 February 2014 as bearded folk musician Briiian Raggatan. Over a year after her album's release, Tunstall left Edinburgh to move to Los Angeles and began a new career as a soundtrack composer. She studied at the Skywalker Ranch and subsequently composed and performed songs for soundtracks including "Miracle" for the film Winter's Tale (featuring Colin Farrell, Russell Crowe, and Will Smith) and "We Could Be Kings", written with A. R. Rahman for the Disney movie Million Dollar Arm and released on 14 May 2014. {{unnecessary information: The song is included on the Million Dollar Arm: Original Motion Picture Soundtrack, which also features songs by Iggy Azalea, Sukhwinder Singh and others.}} She recorded "Float", "Strange Sight", and a duet with Bleu on "1000 Years" for the UK version of Disney's Tinker Bell and the Legend of the NeverBeast, as well as recorded the song "Fit It" for the 2015 film About Ray, featuring Naomi Watts, Elle Fanning, and Susan Sarandon.

=== Kin, Wax and Nut album trilogy (2015–2022) ===
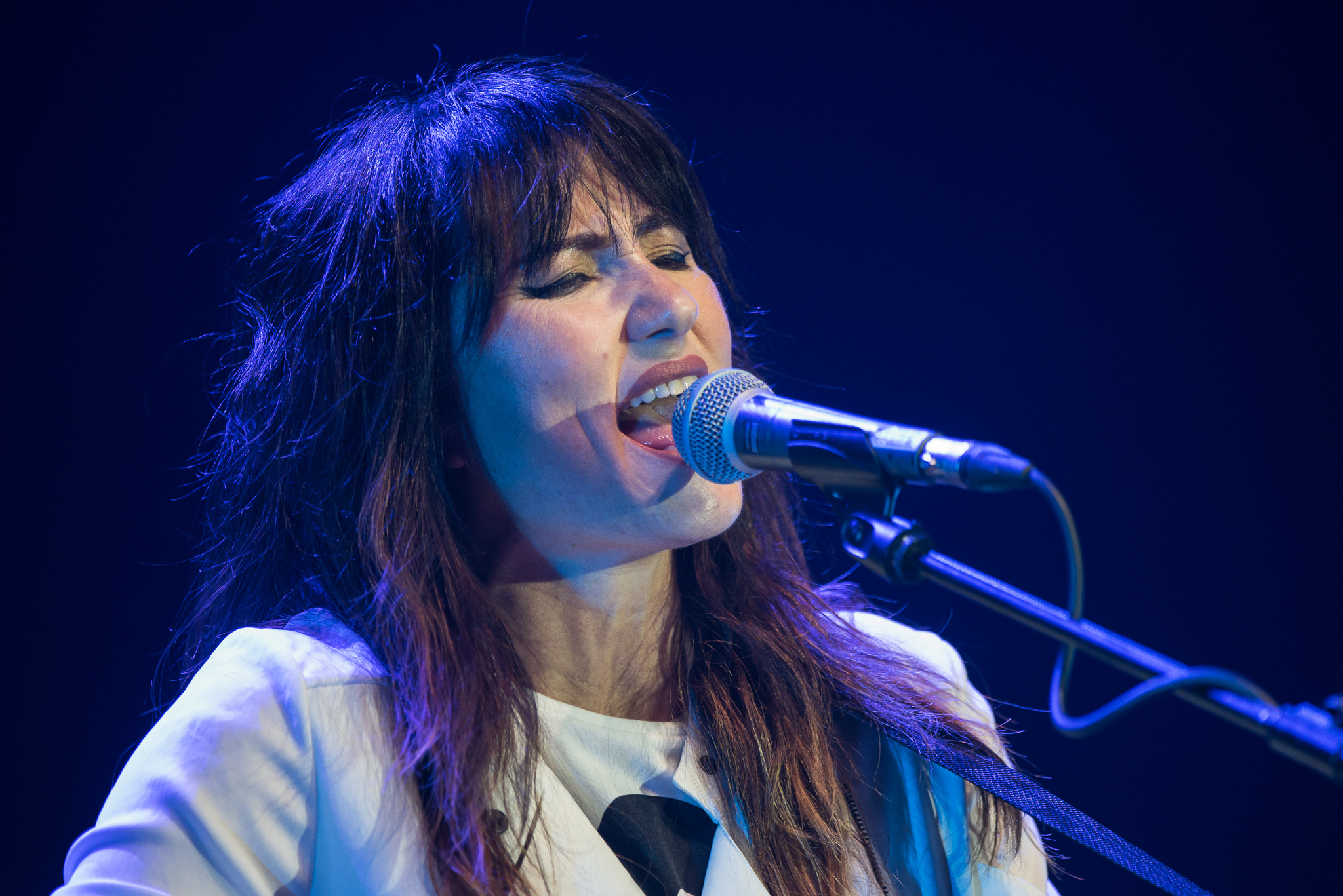
Tunstall performing in 2017

From August to September 2015, Tunstall embarked on a small U.S. tour of eleven dates, playing songs from her various albums and EPs, such as The Scarlet Tulip EP (2011). On 16 June 2016, Tunstall released the Golden State EP before the album release. It is made of the lead single "Evil Eye" and its remix, and two other tracks: "All or Nothing" taken from the French TV series Sam and "The Healer". Tunstall released her fifth studio album, Kin, on 9 September 2016. The album was produced by Tony Hoffer, and recorded in Los Angeles. Four singles were released from this album: the lead single "Maybe It's a Good Thing", plus "Hard Girls" in which Melanie C from the Spice Girls made an appearance, "Love Is an Ocean", and "It Took Me So Long to Get Here, But Here I Am". Tunstall co-wrote "Bad Moms (Suite)", "Enough is Enough (Suite)", and "Get Your Tits Up (Suite)" for the soundtrack of the 2016 comedy Bad Moms.

In 2017, Tunstall announced a trilogy of studio albums following the themes of soul, body and mind. Kin was the first, with the theme of soul. She released the second, Wax, with the theme of body, on 5 October 2018. In 2018, Tunstall contributed several songs to the Pete the Cat children's album including "CatGo & the Nine Lives", "Catalina Casesolver", "Let It Slide" and "CatGo's Weird Song". On 29 August 2019, Tunstall opened for Squeeze at Tanglewood.

In March 2020, Tunstall announced she would start recording the third and final studio album of the trilogy by autumn with the theme of mind. In 2021 she cancelled her summer tour and said she would avoid long runs of performances due to hearing problems. In 2018, she had suffered sudden hearing loss and tinnitus in her left ear. In July 2021, after she started experiencing tinnitus in her right ear, she decided to change her tour schedule to allow for longer periods of rest between performances.

In December 2021, Tunstall performed at the New Year's Eve Times Square Times Square Ball celebration in New York. Since March 2022, Tunstall has narrated adverts for car company Skoda. Tunstall announced her seventh studio album, the third and final album on the Soul, Body and Mind trilogy, would be called Nut. The album was released on 9 September 2022. The album's first single, "Canyons", was released on 1 June 2022.

=== Face to Face and Clueless (2023–present) ===
In August 2023, Tunstall released an album of duets with Suzi Quatro titled Face to Face. After discovering they were mutual fans of each other, they were put in touch with each other by a mutual friend. In November 2023, KT Tunstall was announced as a contributor to a revised version of Clueless, a new musical adapted from the 1995 film. It premiered in the UK at the Churchill Theatre in Bromley in February 2024 featuring an original score by Tunstall and lyricist Glenn Slater. The musical is set for a West End premiere at the Trafalgar Theatre in February 2025.

In July 2026, Tunstall performed at the 2026 Commonwealth Games opening ceremony, performing her singles "Black Horse and the Cherry Tree" and "Suddenly I See", as well as a version of the chant "No Scotland, No Party" which has become synonymous with the Scotland national football team.

== Artistry ==
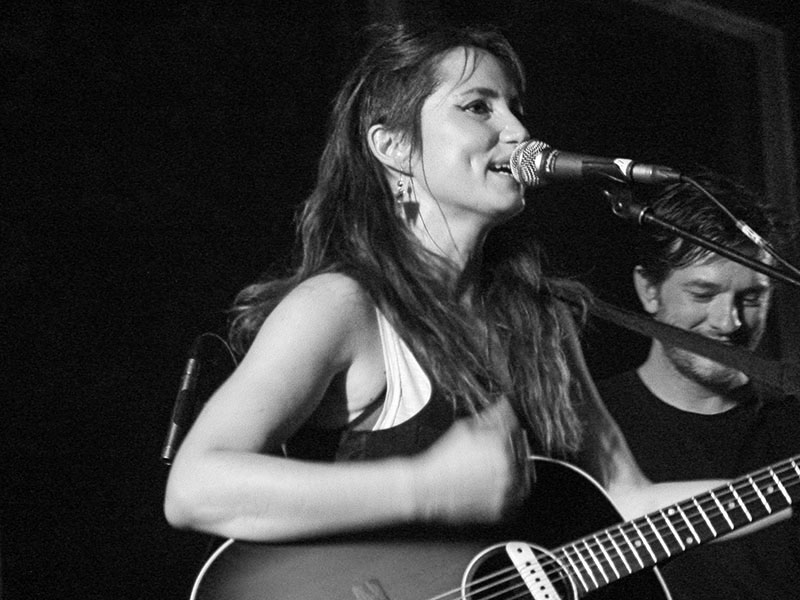
Tunstall at the Aarhus Festival, 2013

Tunstall has a contralto vocal range. Tunstall is known for her live performances, using an Akai Professional E2 Headrush loop pedal which she affectionately calls "Wee Bastard", in her solo performances and with a full four-piece backing band (Luke Bullen on drums, Arnulf Lindner on bass, Sam Lewis on lead guitar and Kenny Dickenson on keyboards, trumpet, percussion and various other instruments), as well as her two backing vocalists, Cat Sforza and Ami Richardson.

After her debut on the BBC's Later... with Jools Holland, Tunstall performed on various American talk shows, including The Ellen DeGeneres Show on 21 September 2007. She has since performed at many large concerts and festivals such as the Hogmanay Edinburgh Concert in 2005. Tunstall said prior to that performance: "This is the gig of a lifetime... This Hogmanay party is probably the best-known and best-loved in the world, and I've been here a few times over the years dreaming of being the one entertaining the crowds. Until we're on that stage I won't believe we're allowed on it." She has also performed at the Glastonbury Festival several times, from 2005 to 2019; the Belladrum Tartan Heart Festival, the American leg of Live Earth in 2007, and the Nobel Peace Prize Concert also in 2007.

== Personal life ==
=== Name ===
Tunstall's first name is Kate, but she chooses to use her initials KT (pronounced "Katie") instead, saying "[Kate] just makes me think of a buxom lass baking bread for her man working in the fields. I have no problem with that, but it's just not really how I pictured being a rock star." The spelling KT, as opposed to Katie, also differentiates Tunstall from fellow singer Katie Melua. She also said that she derived "KT" from K–T impact, the name of a geological event that caused the extinction of dinosaurs.

=== Family ===
Tunstall tracked down her biological mother, Carol Ann, located her in either 1996 or 1998 and learned that Carol was married to cab driver David Orr and had borne three more children. She has been critical of the British National Party (BNP) and publicly disowned Orr in 2010 because of his decision to run as a BNP candidate in the general election for Livingston. She was unable to trace her biological father with the only information she had, saying, "I knew his name, I knew that he was Northern Irish, I knew that he ended up living in northern Scotland." In 2019, she appeared in Series 9 of Long Lost Family. By that time, the media attention had been too much for Carol Ann, and she was grateful to KT ("She has given me a new lease on life") for having relocated her somewhere far away, in Southern Spain. She learned that her biological father, John Corrigan (or John Gabriel, according to other sources) had died in 2002 aged 49, but she was united with two half-sisters, Siobhan and Lesley-Anne, by John's second marriage.

Her adoptive father, David Tunstall, was a lecturer in physics at St Andrews University. The title of her debut studio album, Eye to the Telescope (2004), alludes to her experiences with scientific equipment at his laboratory.

=== Relationships and marriage ===
In 2003, Tunstall began dating Luke Bullen, the drummer in her band. On Christmas Day, 2007, Bullen proposed to her at her parents' home in St Andrews, Scotland, and the couple were married in September 2008. They divorced in May 2013, after separating the year before.

=== Activism ===
In 2008, Tunstall joined the Disko Bay Cape Farewell expedition to the west coast of Greenland. She is a patron of the Educational Wealth Fund (2018).

=== Health ===
In April 2007, Tunstall underwent surgery to correct an undersized kidney, a problem caused by a childhood infection.

In 2008, Tunstall started experiencing problems with the hearing in her left ear. Hearing problems have always been a worry to her; a brother of hers was profoundly deaf since birth. By 2018, the problem had progressed to full left-ear hearing loss and balance problems. In July 2021, she announced that she was having to pull out of her summer tour dates and permanently avoid lengthy runs of closely consecutive performances, citing issues with her right ear which were "exactly how the breakdown of my left ear began". She did perform some solo shows in early summer, including the Spring Hill Arts Gathering (SHAG) in June in Washington Depot, Connecticut.

== Discography ==
- Eye to the Telescope (2004)
- Drastic Fantastic (2007)
- Tiger Suit (2010)
- Invisible Empire // Crescent Moon (2013)
- Kin (2016)
- Wax (2018)
- Nut (2022)
- Face to Face (2023, with Suzi Quatro)
