= The Best of Suede =

Compilation album by Suede
- Released: 1 November 2010
- Recorded: 1992–2002
- Genre: Britpop, alternative rock
- Length: 152:29
- Label: Universal UK
- Producer: Ed Buller, Steve Osborne, Bruce Lampcov, Stephen Street, John Leckie and Dave Eringa

Suede chronology
See You in the Next Life... (2004)	The Best of Suede (2010)	Bloodsports (2013)

Professional ratings
Review scores
Source	Rating
AllMusic	4.5/5 stars
Clash	9/10
Classic Rock	8/10
Consequence of Sound	B
Drowned in Sound	9/10
Pitchfork	8.7/10
PopMatters	8/10 discs
Record Collector	3/5 stars
Uncut	4/5 stars
Yahoo! Music	10/10

The Best of Suede is a compilation album by English alternative rock band Suede, released on 1 November 2010.

== Overview ==
The compilation spans two discs and it is a mix of singles, album tracks and B-sides compiled by lead singer Brett Anderson. Disc one includes all of the band's singles excluding "Positivity" and "Attitude". Disc two includes album tracks from the band's first three albums as well as seven B-sides from disc one of Sci-Fi Lullabies. Both Anderson and former guitarist Bernard Butler were involved in the remastering of the tracks with Chris Potter. The cover artwork is designed by Elizabeth Peyton. Unlike previous hits compilation Singles, this best-of collection was fully endorsed by the band. According to Anderson, it was led by the band: "...that was kind of the whole point of this compilation... the 2 CDs. The first CD we picked, and then the second CD is kind of fan favourites in a way... the fans' favourites and the band’s favourites... a bit more obscure songs and lots of B-sides."

== Reception ==
The collection charted at no. 31 on the UK Albums Chart, on first-week sales of 7,663.

== Track listing ==
Disc one
No.	Title	Writer(s)	Length
1.	"Animal Nitrate" (Suede)	Brett Anderson, Bernard Butler	3:28
2.	"Beautiful Ones" (Coming Up)	Anderson, Richard Oakes	3:50
3.	"Trash" (Coming Up)	Anderson, Oakes	4:08
4.	"Filmstar" (Coming Up)	Anderson, Oakes	3:29
5.	"Metal Mickey" (Suede)	Anderson, Butler	3:27
6.	"New Generation" (Dog Man Star)	Anderson, Butler	4:36
7.	"So Young" (Suede)	Anderson, Butler	3:42
8.	"The Wild Ones" (Dog Man Star)	Anderson, Butler	4:45
9.	"The Drowners" (Suede)	Anderson, Butler	4:11
10.	"Stay Together" (Non-album single)	Anderson, Butler	4:19
11.	"Lazy" (Coming Up)	Anderson	3:18
12.	"Everything Will Flow" (Head Music)	Anderson, Oakes	4:43
13.	"We Are the Pigs" (Dog Man Star)	Anderson, Butler	3:58
14.	"Can't Get Enough" (Head Music)	Anderson, Neil Codling	3:58
15.	"Electricity" (Head Music)	Anderson, Codling, Oakes	4:41
16.	"Obsessions" (A New Morning)	Anderson, Oakes	4:11
17.	"She's in Fashion" (Head Music)	Anderson, Codling	4:53
18.	"Saturday Night" (Coming Up)	Anderson, Oakes	4:28
Total length:			73:56

Disc two
No.	Title	Writer(s)	Length
1.	"Pantomime Horse" (Suede)	Anderson, Butler	5:50
2.	"My Insatiable One" ("The Drowners" b-side)	Anderson, Butler	2:57
3.	"Killing of a Flash Boy" ("We Are the Pigs" b-side)	Anderson, Butler	4:06
4.	"This Hollywood Life" (Dog Man Star)	Anderson, Butler	3:31
5.	"Europe Is Our Playground" ("Trash" b-side / Sci-Fi Lullabies version)	Anderson, Mat Osman	5:38
6.	"My Dark Star" ("Stay Together" b-side)	Anderson, Butler	4:23
7.	"Sleeping Pills" (Suede)	Anderson, Butler	3:53
8.	"By the Sea" (Coming Up)	Anderson	4:17
9.	"She" (Coming Up)	Anderson, Oakes	3:39
10.	"Heroine" (Dog Man Star)	Anderson, Butler	3:20
11.	"The Living Dead" ("Stay Together" b-side)	Anderson, Butler	2:50
12.	"To the Birds" ("The Drowners" b-side)	Anderson, Butler	5:25
13.	"The Big Time" ("Animal Nitrate" b-side)	Anderson, Butler	4:28
14.	"The 2 of Us" (Dog Man Star)	Anderson, Butler	5:45
15.	"The Asphalt World" (Dog Man Star)	Anderson, Butler	9:26
16.	"Still Life" (Dog Man Star)	Anderson, Butler	5:19
17.	"The Next Life" (Suede)	Anderson, Butler	3:40
Total length:			78:49
