= Sci-Fi Lullabies =

Compilation album by Suede
- Released: 6 October 1997
- Recorded: 1992–1996
- Genres: Britpop; glam rock; alternative rock
- Length: 122:48
- Label: Nude
- Producer: Ed Buller

Suede chronology
Coming Up (1996)	Sci-Fi Lullabies (1997)	Head Music (1999)

Sci-Fi Lullabies is a two-disc compilation album by English alternative rock band Suede released by Nude Records on 6 October 1997, consisting of B-sides from the singles that were released from the group's first three albums. It reached no. 9 on the UK Albums Chart, and received universal acclaim on release. In subsequent years, the record has been hailed as one of the finest B-side compilations in popular music.

== Background ==
The album spans two discs and displays the band in its most prolific era. The first disc is dominated by tracks written by the Brett Anderson/Bernard Butler songwriting partnership (the exceptions are "Together," "Bentswood Boys" and "Europe is Our Playground") while the second showcases the various intra-band songwriting variations (Anderson/Richard Oakes and Anderson/Neil Codling, plus Anderson solo and compositions contributed to by the whole band) that emerged following Butler's departure and the subsequent recruitment of a new guitarist, Richard Oakes and keyboardist Neil Codling.

The album is not entirely comprehensive, missing out around half a dozen exclusive songs released as B-sides by the band during the period it covers. Missing Anderson/Butler B-sides are "Painted People" (from "Animal Nitrate"), "Dolly" (from "So Young") and "This World Needs a Father" (from "The Wild Ones" Disc 1), which was the last B-side of the Butler era. Omitted Anderson solo compositions include "Asda Town" (from "The Wild Ones" Disc 2) and "Sam" (from "Beautiful Ones"). Codling's "Digging a Hole" and the band's group effort "Feel", (both from "Lazy"), were omitted from the collection. Live performances released as B-sides (on "New Generation" Disc 2 and "Filmstar" Disc 2) are also not included, neither is Suede's cover of the Pet Shop Boys' "Rent". The track "Eno's Introducing The Band" (from "The Wild Ones" Disc 2) is also not included.

Bassist Mat Osman outlined the band's reasons for the release of the collection, saying: "We had the tracks, we liked them and wanted people to hear them... We were going to release them before our last album (Coming Up in April), but that would have been backwards. Also, a load of bootlegs have begun appearing in Europe, and they cost a sum of money. These are songs we want people to hear. This tends to tie up all the loose ends." The album is considered an important one for fans of the band, partially because of the wealth of material and partially as many of the songs on the compilation are considered to be as strong as or even stronger than the singles from which they came. In Hindsight, in a 2016 interview with Canadian magazine Vice, Anderson revealed some regrets over the content of the collection, which he felt could have been better and possibly his favourite of all Suede albums.

== Reception ==
Professional ratings
Review scores
Source	Rating
AllMusic	4.5/5 stars
Chicago Tribune	3.5/4 stars
Entertainment Weekly	A
The Guardian	3/5 stars
NME	9/10
Pitchfork	8.8/10
Rolling Stone Album Guide	3.5/5 stars
Select	4/5
The Times	4/5 stars
Vox	4/5 stars

The collection was released to universal acclaim, with some of the best reviews coming from the American music press. Tom Lanham of Entertainment Weekly said that Anderson is a "tireless diarist, judging from this anthology of 27 U.K.-single B sides, each one—like the grim concert staple 'Killing of a Flash Boy'—as fey, somber, and solid as any album track." David Daley of the Hartford Courant felt the album was akin to a "best of" release, writing: "Far from an assortment of throwaways that didn't make the albums, this essential double-disc, 27-song set contains some of Suede's strongest material... the perfect antidote to Oasis' cartoonish 'Best Band' claims."

Likewise, also comparing Suede to Oasis, Ed Masley of the Pittsburgh Post-Gazette admitted that Suede would always be the underdog to their Britpop rivals. However, he said that the songs on Sci-Fi Lullabies "could outshine most of their better-known UK rivals' finest gems." Kurt B. Reighley of CMJ New Music Monthly found the compilation to be overlong and, in contrast to other writers, pointed to the second disc as the strongest. He conceded, however, that "there's nary a track among these 27 that wouldn't have made a worthwhile album cut, and a few that merit A-side status." In a retrospective review, Stephen Thomas Erlewine of AllMusic noted that CD1 "is as strong as any of their albums," and that several tracks are "strong enough to be A-sides." Overall he said, "this is absolutely essential material, confirming the group's status as one of the '90s' greatest bands."

The collection was widely praised by several notable music critics of the UK press. Mark Beaumont of NME said that while the second disc resembles a typical B-sides album, the first "stakes a formidable claim as the fourth Suede album in its own right" and is arguably superior to three acclaimed studio albums of the period: Radiohead's OK Computer, Spiritualized's Ladies and Gentlemen We Are Floating in Space, and Suede's own Coming Up. John Harris of Select said the album plays like "a retelling of the entire Suede movie script" and is "truly as good as most Greatest Hits albums." Writing for Vox, Simon Price felt that Anderson wrote some of his funniest lyrics on CD2, on the tracks "Young Men" and "Jumble Sale Mums". Aside from "Duchess", which he called "lazy rubbish," he had strong praise for both discs.

The album continued Suede's run of consecutive top ten albums, peaking at no. 9 in October 1997. Despite never placing on any of Billboard's charts, Sci-Fi Lullabies had sold 19,000 units in the US by 2008, according to Nielsen SoundScan.

== Legacy ==
"We were lucky that we came a generation after The Smiths because they upped the ante. They were the first band whose singles I can remember buying for the B-sides. They made me realize that singles mattered and B-sides mattered. Our B-sides were never an afterthought, because it was all about the whole package. The single cover looked like the tracks inside and songs worked with each other. Sci-Fi Lullabies was a chance to bring together some of our favorite B-sides."

— Mat Osman reflecting on the compilation.

Keith Phipps of The A.V. Club and Scott Plagenhoef of Stylus Magazine spoke of the effort invested in Suede's B-sides, with the band discarding "failed" ideas or experiments in favour of high quality tracks. Plagenhoef asserted: "Those early B-sides—collected on disc one of Sci-Fi Lullabies remain Suede's strongest collection of songs." The album has been named as one of the finest in the B-side/rarity genre. Independent critic Simon Price hailed it as "the greatest B-sides album ever made." Kevin Courtney of The Irish Times expressed similar views of the album's quality, while admitting that only The Smiths' Hatful Of Hollow could supersede it. Another Irish Times writer Brian Boyd felt that a compressed version of the collection would be a hit record, writing: "if this was a single 12-track album, it would be pushing for inclusion in the album of the year lists."

In 2017, Pitchfork ranked the record at number thirty in its list, "The 50 Best Britpop Albums." The A.V. Club included the compilation in its list of 35 essential B-side/rarity/outtakes collections. The article described Sci-Fi Lullabies as being "as good as any of Suede's proper albums." NME featured the compilation in their list of "30 Killer B-Side And Rarities Albums You Might've Missed", noting that Suede's B-sides "were as exciting as anything Britpop could muster." The record was also included in a 2013 NME poll of the 500 greatest albums of all time, where it placed at number 448. The 1995 book, Spin Alternative Record Guide wrote: "Like the Smiths, Suede littered many of its best songs on its B-sides, a case in point being the fine 'My Insatiable One'." The song was covered by former Smiths singer Morrissey during his 1992 solo world tour.

== Live performances ==
The Suede B-sides have been an integral part of Suede's live shows as well as Anderson's solo performances. Favourites from disc one include "The Living Dead" and "Killing of a Flash Boy", which were performed at Suede's March 2010 reunion shows in London. Anderson and Butler made their last TV appearance on MTV's Most Wanted in March 1994, where they performed the popular "Stay Together" B-sides "The Living Dead" and "My Dark Star". In April 1997, Suede played an entire set of B-sides at a fanclub gig at the Kentish Town Forum.

== Title and artwork ==
The title of the album is adapted (in plural form) from the lyrics of "Introducing the Band", a song from the band's second album Dog Man Star. The title had previously been considered as a title for that album.

The collection is accompanied by a 32-page, full-color lyric booklet designed by Peter Saville. The front cover, whose artistic similarities to J. G. Ballard were noted by the BBC's Stephen Dowling, features a destroyed English Electric Lightning aircraft abandoned and used for target practice at the Otterburn Training Area in Northumberland. It was taken by North East photographer John Kippin.

== Track listing ==
All tracks are written by Brett Anderson and Bernard Butler, except where noted.

Disc one
No.	Title	Writer(s)	Single	Length
1.	"My Insatiable One"		"The Drowners" (1992)	2:57
2.	"To the Birds"		"The Drowners"	5:24
3.	"Where the Pigs Don't Fly"		"Metal Mickey" (1992)	5:33
4.	"He's Dead"		"Metal Mickey"	5:13
5.	"The Big Time"		"Animal Nitrate" (1993)	4:28
6.	"High Rising"		"So Young" (1993)	5:49
7.	"The Living Dead"		"Stay Together" (1994)	2:48
8.	"My Dark Star"		"Stay Together"	4:26
9.	"Killing of a Flash Boy"		"We Are the Pigs" (1994)	4:07
10.	"Whipsnade"		"We Are the Pigs"	4:22
11.	"Modern Boys"		"The Wild Ones" (1994)	4:07
12.	"Together"	Anderson; Richard Oakes	"New Generation" (1995)	4:29
13.	"Bentswood Boys"	Anderson; Oakes	"New Generation"	3:15
14.	"Europe Is Our Playground" (new version)	Anderson; Mat Osman	"Trash" (1996)	5:39

All tracks are written by Anderson and Oakes, except where noted.

Disc two
No.	Title	Writer(s)	Single	Length
1.	"Every Monday Morning Comes"		"Trash"	4:28
2.	"Have You Ever Been This Low?"		"Trash"	3:52
3.	"Another No One"	Anderson	"Trash"	3:56
4.	"Young Men"		"Beautiful Ones" (1996)	4:35
5.	"The Sound of the Streets"	Anderson	"Beautiful Ones"	4:59
6.	"Money"		"Beautiful Ones"	4:04
7.	"W.S.D" (full version)	Anderson	"Saturday Night" (1997)	5:46
8.	"This Time"		"Saturday Night"	5:46
9.	"Jumble Sale Mums"		"Saturday Night"	4:15
10.	"These Are the Sad Songs"		"Lazy" (1997)	6:20
11.	"Sadie"		"Lazy"	5:24
12.	"Graffiti Women"	Anderson	"Filmstar" (1997)	4:51
13.	"Duchess"	Anderson; Neil Codling	"Filmstar"	3:55

== Personnel ==
Suede

- Brett Anderson – vocals
- Bernard Butler - guitars, keyboards (disc one: tracks 1–11)
- Richard Oakes – guitars (disc one: tracks 12–14 and disc two)
- Neil Codling - keyboards (disc one: track 14 and disc two)
- Mat Osman - bass
- Simon Gilbert – drums

Production

- Ed Buller – production (except disc one: track 14 and disc two: tracks 10–13), mixing (disc one: tracks 1–11)
- Bruce Lampcov – production (disc two: tracks 10, 11)
- Ian Caple – production (disc two: tracks 12, 13)
- Miti Adhikari – recording (disc one: track 14)

== Charts ==
1997 chart performance for Sci-Fi Lullabies
Chart (1997)	Peak position
Finnish Albums (Suomen virallinen lista)	12
Norwegian Albums (VG-lista)	22
Swedish Albums (Sverigetopplistan)	16
UK Albums (Official Charts)	9

2022 chart performance for Sci-Fi Lullabies
Chart (2022)	Peak position
Scottish Albums (Official Charts)	83
UK Independent Albums (Official Charts)	19

== 2025 expanded edition ==
On 23 May 2025, Edsel and Demon issued an expanded 3-disc edition of Sci-Fi Lullabies, with the original two discs joined by a third CD containing 19 additional B-sides from singles released between 1999 and 2023. There will also be vinyl releases of both the original 27-track collection (across three LPs) and, as a limited-edition Record Store Day release, the additional 19 later tracks as a 2-disc set. The album was also released digitally as Sci-Fi Lullabies Vol. 2.

All tracks are written by Anderson and Oakes, except where noted.

Sci-Fi Lullabies vol. 2
No.	Title	Writer(s)	Album / single	Length
1.	"The Sadness in You, the Sadness in Me"	Anderson; Oakes; Osman; Codling; Simon Gilbert	Autofiction: Expanded (2023)	4:30
2.	"Dawn Chorus"	Anderson; Oakes; Osman; Codling; Gilbert	Bloodsports bonus track (2013)	4:04
3.	"Let Go"	Anderson; Oakes; Osman; Codling; Gilbert	"Can't Get Enough" (1999)	4:27
4.	"Crackhead"	Anderson; Oakes; Osman; Codling; Gilbert	"Everything Will Flow" (1999)	5:53
5.	"Cheap"		"Positivity" (2002)	4:43
6.	"Simon"		"Positivity" (2002)	4:34
7.	"What Violet Says"	Anderson; Osman	"Hit Me" (2013)	4:12
8.	"Still Waiting"	Anderson; Codling	Autofiction: Expanded	2:50
9.	"Manipulation"		The Blue Hour deluxe edition (2018)	2:09
10.	"You Don't Know Me"		Autofiction: Expanded	3:33
11.	"Days Like Dead Moths"	Anderson; Codling; Oakes	Autofiction: Expanded	3:44
12.	"Since You Went Away"	Anderson	"Can't Get Enough" (1999)	3:07
13.	"Heroin"	Anderson	Head Music deluxe edition (2011)	2:55
14.	"Leaving"		"Everything Will Flow" (1999)	4:17
15.	"God's Gift"	Anderson	"She's in Fashion" (1999)	2:56
16.	"There Is No Me If There Is No You"		Autofiction: Expanded	3:07
17.	"Darkest Days"	Anderson; Codling; Oakes	"For the Strangers" (2013)	3:48
18.	"The Prey"	Anderson; Codling; Oakes	Autofiction: Expanded	3:36
19.	"Blinded"		previously unreleased	4:58
