= Antidepressants (album) =

2025 studio album by Suede

Studio album by Suede
- Released: 5 September 2025
- Studios: ICP, Brussels; Sleeper Sounds, London; RMV, Stockholm; RAK, London
- Genres: Post-punk; gothic rock
- Length: 39:34
- Label: BMG
- Producer: Ed Buller

Suede chronology
Autofiction (2022)	Antidepressants (2025)

Singles from Antidepressants
- 1. "Disintegrate" Released: 19 May 2025; 2. "Trance State" Released: 11 June 2025; 3. "Dancing with the Europeans" Released: 28 July 2025; 4. "Sweet Kid" Released: 13 January 2026

Antidepressants is the tenth studio album by English rock band Suede, released on 5 September 2025 through BMG and produced by Ed Buller. Intended to be the second in a trilogy of "black and white" albums starting with Autofiction (2022), it has been described as a post-punk and gothic rock album with themes such as mortality and human connection in a disconnected world. It also sees Brett Anderson occasionally implement spoken word, inspired by contemporary bands.

Antidepressants was preceded by three singles—"Disintegrate", "Trance State", and "Dancing with the Europeans"—and was succeeded by its fourth single "Sweet Kid" in January 2026. The record was critically acclaimed, with critics often comparing it to Autofiction and praising the group for incorporating a modern approach to their music. It appeared on several publications' year-end best lists and was shortlisted for the 2026 Mercury Prize. Commercially, it debuted on the UK Albums Chart at number 2, and it charted in the top 40 of several other countries and territories.

== Background and recording ==
In 2025, frontman Brett Anderson revealed in Mojo magazine that before their previous album, Autofiction (2022), was released, the band had initially intended for its follow-up to take an artier approach: a ballet soundtrack. However, upon the album's positive reception, the project was shelved, with only "Between an Atom and a Star" and "Life Is Endless, Life Is a Moment" repurposed for Antidepressants.

In June 2024, before a performance at the Isle of Wight Festival, Anderson and bassist Mat Osman sat down for an interview with Ben Burrell for Absolute Radio, where the former revealed that the band was recording the album. In a press release, he said that "If Autofiction was our punk record, Antidepressants is our post-punk record." Produced by Suede's longstanding producer Ed Buller, it was recorded between ICP Studios in Brussels, RAK and Sleeper Sounds Studios in London, and RMV Studio in Stockholm.

== Title and artwork ==
The album previously had the working title Broken Music for Broken People, which, like Antidepressants, is also the name of a track. Anderson had also considered Suppression, which would have addressed both his feelings of being trapped in a "digital cage" and the "joyous moments" that nonetheless emerge from such suppression. He ultimately decided against that title, believing that it was too dark. Antidepressants was chosen so that it could take on a more literal interpretation: that in his life, music acts as an antidepressant. The front cover alludes to a 1962 Vogue photograph taken by John Deakin of the artist Francis Bacon, in which he posed shirtless between two slabs of meat; the photo of Bacon is in turn a reference to his painting Figure with Meat.

== Composition ==
=== Style ===
"Life Is Endless, Life Is a Moment"
An excerpt from "Life Is Endless, Life Is a Moment", an album track that incorporates elements from the gothic rock genre.

Antidepressants has been described in reviews as post-punk and gothic rock. Like its predecessor, it took a guitar-led approach, with guitarist Richard Oakes at one point elaborating how the stylistic backdrop for Autofiction allowed him draw upon early influences such as Keith Levene, John McGeoch, the Fall, and Wire. Anderson, inspired by contemporary bands' incorporation of spoken word vocals such as Dry Cleaning, Shame, and Yard Act, occasionally performs in spoken word himself, like on the introduction to "Disintegrate" and on "June Rain". In addition, the album also displays a further shift towards anthemic choruses. particularly when compared to Autofiction. Typical of Suede albums, it also features ballads, such as "June Rain", "Somewhere Between an Atom and Star", and "Life Is Endless, Life Is a Moment". The latter closes the album with a heavily gothic-influenced sound, cited in Louder Than War for its "tribal drums, spooky low bass line, chiming guitars and ethereal keys".

=== Themes and lyrics ===
There's certainly a sense of memento mori about the record. People might see it as morbid and macabre, but it's actually life-affirming: the reminder of death makes you aware of how precious life is. It's about the joy within a moment when you realise that life is fleeting and you have to live it to the full.

— Brett Anderson, Uncut (Note: The original Uncut magazine review contained a supplemental interview of Anderson. When the review was ported onto their website, the interview was omitted.)

Antidepressants explores themes such as paranoia, death, and finding connection in a disconnected world. At the onset, an automated voice says the phrase "connected, disconnected". While the overall result is dark, both in tone and in subject matter, the lyrics often employ a more optimistic perspective. "Dancing with the Europeans", inspired by a gig in Spain that helped to bring Anderson out of a depressive state, is a celebration of the connections that people have in an otherwise disconnected world. On "Broken Music for Broken People", seen by critics as reminiscent of Suede's 1996 song "Trash", it suggests that music offers the socially disenfranchised a means to connect. "Sweet Kid" is a song of reassurances toward Anderson's son, told from a frame of reference driven by an awareness of his own mortality.

== Promotion and singles ==
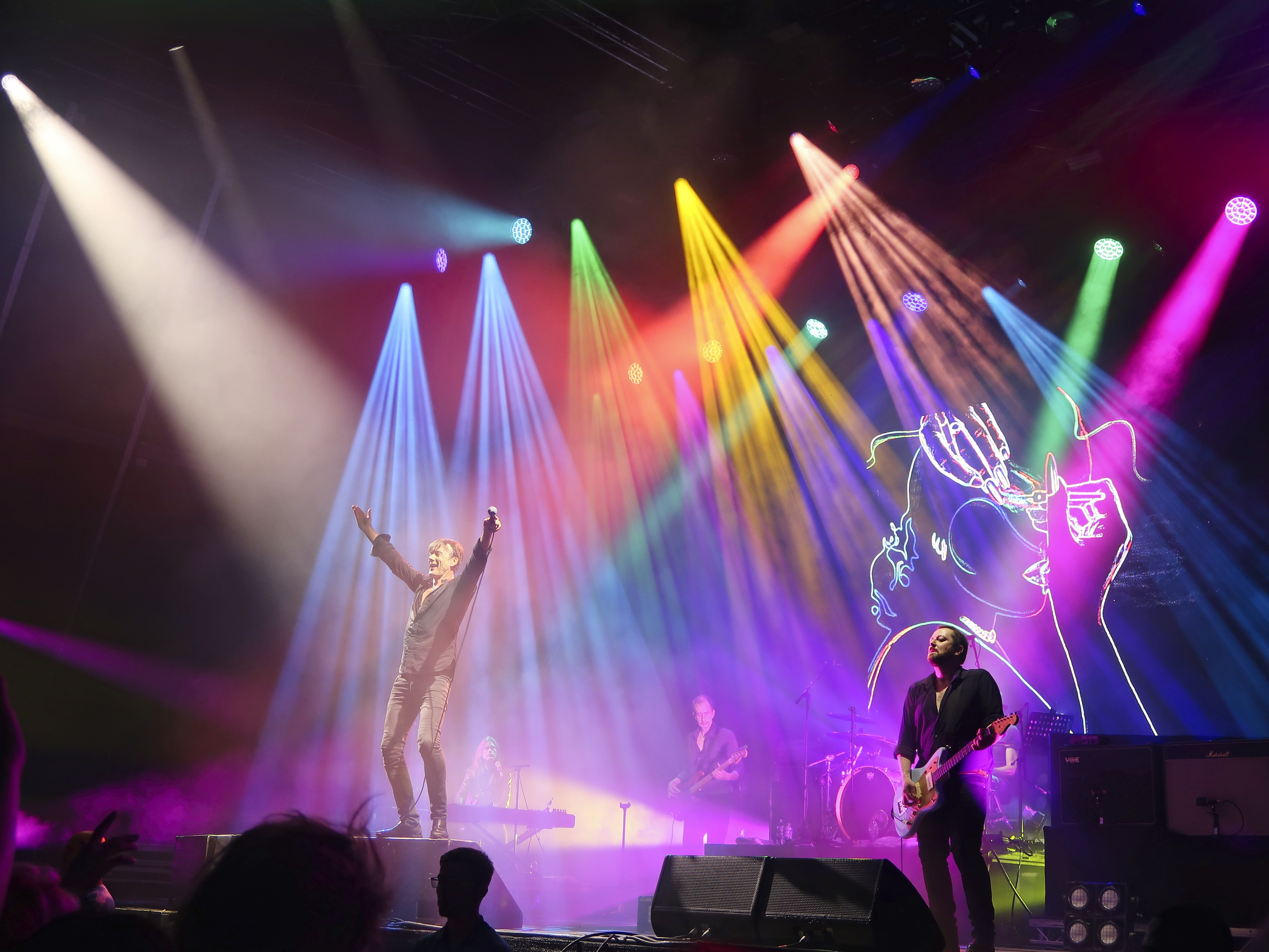
Suede performing at Alexandra Palace, July 2024.

During the Isle of Wight Festival performance in mid-2024, Suede debuted Antidepressants's title track. On 12 May 2025, the band released a video of a separate live performance of the song from July 2024 at Alexandra Palace, London. One week later, Suede revealed the lead single, "Disintegrate", with a black and white music video directed by Chris Turner. The single was also accompanied with details of the album, including the title, artwork, release date, and track listing. After releasing their second single "Trance State" on 11 June, Suede premiered "Dancing with the Europeans" on 28 July with another video by Turner, filmed during a gig at Bush Hall, London.

On 26 August 2025, just ten days before its release, Suede performed the album in full at the Clore Ballroom in Southbank Centre, London, where they were scheduled to return in September for a week-long residency dubbed Suede Takeover. During the concert, Anderson shared that the band intends for Antidepressants to be the second part in a trilogy of "black and white" albums including Autofiction, with the third part to be released later in the decade. On 19 October, Suede performed "Disintegrate" live on the BBC Two programme Later... with Jools Holland. On 13 January 2026, Suede released "Sweet Kid" as the fourth single in anticipation of a UK tour. Promotionally, it was marketed as a double A-side single with "Antidepressants".

== Release ==
Antidepressants was released on 5 September 2025 through BMG. In addition to standard physical formats (CD, vinyl, and cassette), a deluxe CD containing three bonus tracks was made available and packaged in a "Hessian slip case", and the Japanese CD contains a separate bonus track entitled "Medication". Prior to release, the September 2025 issue of the UK magazine Mojo included a 15-track covermount CD of Suede material with the title Outsiders: Live. Rare. Unreleased. 1990–2025, containing the aforementioned performance of "Antidepressants" at Alexandra Palace, a demo of "Disintegrate", and the album track "Criminal Ways".

=== Commercial performance ===
In the UK, Antidepressants had debuted at the top of the Official Charts' midweek update chart, and while it led in physical and digital sales by a considerable margin, the unavailability of Spotify data during much of the week obscured the number of sales-equivalent streams. Ultimately, Sabrina Carpenter's Man's Best Friend retained the number one position from the previous week. Antidepressants debuted on the UK Albums Chart at number two, selling 16,091 units in the first week, more than its predecessor Autofiction. The album did, however, debut at number one on both the Scottish and UK Independent Albums Charts. Additionally, it reached the top 10 in Austria and in Belgium's Wallonia region, and it charted within the top 40 in Belgium's Flanders region, Finland, Germany, Ireland, the Netherlands, Spain, and Switzerland.

=== Antidepressants: Expanded ===
On 8 June 2026, Suede released the new song "Emotionally Unavailable" with a lyric video, and with the song they announced a triple-CD expanded version of the album, entitled Antidepressants: Expanded, released on 10 July 2026 through BMG. The first disc contains the original album in full, and the second consists of "Emotionally Unavailable" and the bonus tracks from the deluxe CD and Japanese CD versions. The third disc contains demos for each of the eleven original tracks, previously available on vinyl for Record Store Day 2026. It is packaged in a hardcover slipcase with a 36-page booklet.

== Critical reception ==
Professional ratings
Aggregate scores
Source	Rating
AnyDecentMusic?	8.3/10
Metacritic	89/100
Review scores
Source	Rating
Clash	8/10
Classic Pop	4.5/5 stars
The Guardian	4/5 stars
The Line of Best Fit	9/10
Louder Than War	5/5 stars
Mojo	5/5 stars
MusicOMH	5/5 stars
Record Collector	4/5 stars
Spill Magazine	3.5/5 stars
Uncut	8/10

According to the review aggregator Metacritic, Antidepressants received "universal acclaim" based on a weighted average score of 89 out of 100 from 14 critic scores. AnyDecentMusic?, another aggregator, gave it an average rating of 8.3 out of 10 from a sample of 18 critical reviews.

Some reviewers compared the album to its immediate predecessor Autofiction (2022). Emma Harrison, writing for Clash magazine, said it twisted Autofiction's "raw energy ... into a dense, distorted fever dream", resulting in one of the best albums the band had made to that point. In Beats Per Minute, John Wohlmacher said that although Autofiction "was this joyful, life affirming record that cut all fat", Antidepressants was an improvement overall, additionally finding it to be a "more poignant" album. Claire Biddles of The Quietus analogised the band's trajectory to the transition from their debut Suede (1993) to the "considered and progressive, if not as immediately thrilling" Dog Man Star (1994), finding the album to be an adequate midpoint for a trilogy. Otherwise, Biddles praised the album for continuing to capture the dynamics of the band's live performances.

Multiple critics praised Suede for pursuing a more modern sound given their age. AllMusic's Matt Collar opined that with Antidepressants, they successfully adapted the style of their early work while avoiding an outdated sound, attributing much of this to "Anderson's soulful, poetic gravitas". John Earls of Classic Pop magazine commended Suede for successfully modernising their sound despite its difficulty, though he called "Somewhere Between an Atom and a Star" "traditional" and an exception. Likewise, Shawn Curran of Record Collector praised Suede for remaining "interesting and invigorated", crediting Oakes in particular for his contributions.

In light of the publicised reunions for Oasis and Pulp, both peers of Suede during the Britpop era, Ben Hogwood of MusicOMH lauded the band for their willingness to look forward and address more modern concerns, finishing their five-star review by saying Suede was "at the very height of their powers." In The Guardian, Dave Simpson similarly expressed that "Antidepressants is no throwback. It's thoroughly postmodern", adding in a four star review that they believe it is the band's best album since they reunited and "a late career triumph". In The Line of Best Fit, Matt Young thought the album displayed an authenticity by avoiding a more nostalgic approach for a group their age, concluding that while Antidepressants is "Not necessarily healing, it's just honest."

Stephen Troussé of Uncut, rating Antidepressants 8 out of 10, deemed it their best album since Coming Up and said it "boasts the best first side of a goth album since the Banshees' Juju". In Spectrum Culture, Will Pinford considered it to be among Suede's best albums and Anderson's best vocal performances, lauding the closer in particular. However, both Troussé and Pinford were critical of the pacing of the second half. In DIY, Louisa Dixon's main criticism pertained to lyrical repetition, specifically in "Dancing with the Europeans" and "Criminal Ways", but they found it "solid" and "pleasantly dense" overall.

=== Accolades ===
Antidepressants was shortlisted for the 2026 Mercury Prize, which chooses the best album of the year among British and Irish artists. It marked their third album to be nominated, following their debut Suede (1993), which won, and Coming Up (1996). On 22 October 2026, Suede opened for the ceremony with a live performance of "Dancing with the Europeans".

The album was also mentioned in several notable lists of the best albums of 2025. It ranked within the top ten on BrooklynVegan and Under the Radar, within the top three on Classic Pop, Louder Than War, Mojo, Record Collector, and Uncut, and music critic Stephen Thomas Erlewine ranked it the number one best album of the year.

Year-end lists
Publication	List	Rank	Ref.
AllMusic	Favorite Rock & Metal Albums	N/A (Note: The 2025 year-end list "Favorite Rock & Metal Albums" on AllMusic lists 40 albums with no specific order.)	
BrooklynVegan	Top 40 Albums of 2025	9	
Classic Pop	The Best of 2025: New Albums	3	
Classic Rock	Top 50 Albums of 2025	37	
The Guardian	The 50 Best Albums of 2025	13	
Flood Magazine	The Best Albums of 2025	40	
Louder Than War	Top 100 Albums of 2025	2	
Mojo	The 75 Best Albums of 2025	2	
Pitchfork	The 30 Best Rock Albums of 2025	30	
PopMatters	The 80 Best Albums of 2025	64	
PopMatters	The 30 Best Rock Albums of 2025	13	
The Quietus	Albums of the Year 2025	21	
Record Collector	The Best of 2025: New Albums Top 25	3	
Stephen Thomas Erlewine	STE's Best Albums of 2025	1	
Uncut	Best New Albums of 2025	3	
Under the Radar	Top 100 Albums of 2025	9	

== Track listing ==
All tracks are written by Brett Anderson, Neil Codling, and Richard Oakes, except where noted.

Antidepressants track listing
No.	Title	Writer(s)	Length
1.	"Disintegrate"	Anderson; Oakes	3:42
2.	"Dancing with the Europeans"	Anderson; Oakes	3:45
3.	"Antidepressants"		3:26
4.	"Sweet Kid"		2:59
5.	"The Sound and the Summer"		3:42
6.	"Somewhere Between an Atom and a Star"		2:50
7.	"Broken Music for Broken People"	Anderson; Oakes	3:11
8.	"Criminal Ways"	Anderson; Oakes	2:27
9.	"Trance State"		4:23
10.	"June Rain"	Anderson; Oakes	3:57
11.	"Life Is Endless, Life Is a Moment"	Anderson; Codling	5:12
Total length:			39:34

Deluxe CD bonus tracks
No.	Title	Writer(s)	Length
12.	"Dirty Looks"	Anderson; Oakes	2:57
13.	"Sharpening Knives"		3:38
14.	"Overload"		2:51
Total length:			49:00

Japanese CD bonus track
No.	Title	Length
12.	"Medication"	3:19

Antidepressants: Expanded 3-CD disc 2
No.	Title	Length
1.	"Emotionally Unavailable"	2:50
2.	"Overload"	2:51
3.	"Sharpening Knives"	3:38
4.	"Dirty Looks"	2:57
5.	"Medication"	3:19

== Personnel ==
Credits are adapted from the deluxe CD liner notes.

Suede

- Brett Anderson – vocals, design
- Mat Osman – bass
- Neil Codling – synthesiser, piano
- Richard Oakes – guitars
- Simon Gilbert – drums

Additional personnel

- Jordon Aniseed – additional vocals (tracks 1, 5, 7, 9)
- Ed Buller – production, engineering
- Giovanni Lando, Ben Webster, Sam Wilkins – engineering (ICP Studios)
- Jamie Sprosen – engineering (Sleeper Sounds)
- Vilma Colling, Linn Fijal, Nathalie Martinez – engineering (RMV Studio, 1–11)
- Sam Button – engineering (RAK Studios, 1–11)
- Andrew Scheps – mixing (Punkerpad UK and RAK, 1–11)
- Caesar Edmunds – mixing (Battery Studios, 12–14)
- Matt Colton – mastering (Metropolis Studios)
- Paul Khera – design

== Charts ==
Chart performance for Antidepressants
Chart (2025)	Peak position
Austrian Albums (Ö3 Austria)	9
Belgian Albums (Ultratop Flanders)	18
Belgian Albums (Ultratop Wallonia)	9
Croatian International Albums (HDU)	32
Dutch Albums (Album Top 100)	34
Finnish Albums (Suomen virallinen lista)	28
French Albums (SNEP)	84
French Rock & Metal Albums (SNEP)	5
German Albums (Offizielle Top 100)	24
German Rock & Metal Albums (Offizielle Top 100)	10
Irish Albums (OCC)	36
Irish Independent Albums (IRMA)	4
Italian Albums (FIMI)	84
Japanese Albums (Oricon)	47
Japanese Rock Albums (Oricon)	13
Scottish Albums (OCC)	1
Spanish Albums (PROMUSICAE)	23
Swedish Albums (Sverigetopplistan)	56
Swiss Albums (Schweizer Hitparade)	14
UK Albums (Official Charts)	2
UK Independent Albums (OCC)	1
