= Lazy (Suede song) =

1997 single by Suede

Single by Suede

from the album Coming Up
- B-side: "These Are the Sad Songs"; "Feel"; "Sadie"; "Digging a Hole"; "She" (live)
- Released: 7 April 1997
- Length: 3:19
- Label: Nude
- Songwriter: Brett Anderson
- Producers: Ed Buller; Bruce Lampcov

Suede singles chronology
"Saturday Night" (1997)	"Lazy" (1997)	"Filmstar" (1997)

"Lazy" is the fourth single from English rock band Suede's third album, Coming Up (1996). Released on 7 April 1997 through Nude Records, "Lazy" was the fourth single from the album to reach the top 10 of the UK Singles Chart, peaking at number nine. The song also reached the top 20 in Finland, Iceland, and Sweden.

"Lazy" was produced by Ed Buller while the additional B-side tracks were by Bruce Lampcov. The song "Digging a Hole" on CD2 was written and performed solo by keyboard player Neil Codling on lead vocals, although is still credited as Suede.

== Music video ==
The video for the song was directed by Pedro Romhanyi, who previously made videos for the band's songs, "Animal Nitrate", "Beautiful Ones" and "Saturday Night". The rather abstract clip features mostly slow motion shots of the band relaxing inside a bedsit, as singer Brett Anderson peers through a tiny gap in the floorboards into his neighbour's apartment. At one point in the video, keyboardist Neil Codling is seen laughing as he feeds a mushroom to some goldfish before confronting Brett Anderson with a mirror he positions in a way which shows their faces combining as one.

== Track listings ==
UK CD1

1. "Lazy" (Brett Anderson)
2. "These Are the Sad Songs" (Anderson, Richard Oakes)
3. "Feel" (Anderson, Neil Codling, Simon Gilbert, Oakes, Mat Osman)

UK CD2

1. "Lazy" (Anderson)
2. "Sadie" (Anderson, Oakes)
3. "Digging a Hole" (Codling)

UK cassette single

1. "Lazy" (Anderson)
2. "She" (live) (Anderson, Oakes)

European CD single

1. "Lazy" (album version) (Anderson)
2. "Sadie" (Anderson, Oakes)

Australian CD single

1. "Lazy" (Anderson)
2. "These Are the Sad Songs" (Anderson, Oakes)
3. "Feel" (Anderson, Codling, Gilbert, Oakes, Osman)
4. "Sadie" (Anderson, Oakes)

Japanese CD single

1. "Lazy" (Anderson)
2. "These Are the Sad Songs" (Anderson, Oakes)
3. "Feel" (Anderson, Codling, Gilbert, Oakes, Osman)
4. "Sadie" (Anderson, Oakes)
5. "Digging a Hole" (Codling)

== Charts ==
Chart (1997)	Peak position
Australia (ARIA)	156
Europe (Eurochart Hot 100)	95
Finland (Suomen virallinen lista)	10
Iceland (Íslenski Listinn Topp 40)	8
Israel (IBA)	13
Scotland Singles (Official Charts)	12
Sweden (Sverigetopplistan)	19
UK Singles (Official Charts)	9

== Release history ==
Region	Date	Format(s)	Label(s)	Ref.
United Kingdom	7 April 1997	CD; cassette	Nude	
Japan	28 May 1997	CD	Nude	
