= Filmstar (song) =

1997 single by Suede

Single by Suede

from the album Coming Up
- B-side: "Graffiti Women"; "Duchess"
- Released: 11 August 1997
- Genre: Britpop; alternative rock; glam rock
- Length: 3:25
- Label: Nude
- Songwriters: Brett Anderson; Richard Oakes
- Producers: Ed Buller; Ian Caple

Suede singles chronology
"Lazy" (1997)	"Filmstar" (1997)	"Electricity" (1999)

"Filmstar" is a song by English rock band Suede, released as the fifth and final single from their third album, Coming Up (1996), on 11 August 1997 through Nude Records. The single entered the top 10 of the UK singles chart, peaking at number nine, thus making all five singles released from the album top-10 hits. Outside the UK, "Filmstar" became a top-10 hit in Iceland and a top-20 hit in Finland and Sweden. The live songs on CD2 are performed with Neil Tennant. "Filmstar" was produced by Ed Buller, while "Graffiti Women" and "Duchess" were produced by Ian Caple.

== Music video ==
The music video for the "Filmstar", filmed in black and white, was directed by Zowie Broach, and features the band in a typical live concert setting. The audience in this case were special invitees through the band's official fanclub, who were prominently featured in the video. Fans who attended the shoot were treated to a short but free Suede concert as a reward for having to watch the band run through "Filmstar" multiple times, as is standard on video shoots.

== Track listings ==
UK 7-inch single

A. "Filmstar" (Brett Anderson, Richard Oakes)
B. "Filmstar" (original) (Anderson, Oakes)

UK CD1

1. "Filmstar" (Anderson, Oakes)
2. "Graffiti Women" (Anderson)
3. "Duchess" (Anderson, Neil Codling)
4. "Beautiful Ones" (video)
5. Exclusive studio recording footage

UK CD2

1. "Filmstar" (Anderson, Oakes)
2. "Rent" (live) (Neil Tennant, Chris Lowe)
3. "Saturday Night" (live) (Anderson, Oakes)
4. "Saturday Night" (video)

== Charts ==
=== Weekly charts ===
Chart (1997)	Peak position
Europe (Eurochart Hot 100)	60
Finland (Suomen virallinen lista)	12
Iceland (Íslenski Listinn Topp 40)	6
Israel (IBA)	30
Scotland Singles (Official Charts)	13
Sweden (Sverigetopplistan)	17
UK Singles (Official Charts)	9

=== Year-end charts ===
Chart (1997)	Position
Iceland (Íslenski Listinn Topp 40)	71
