= Autofiction (album) =

Studio album by Suede
- Released: 16 September 2022
- Recorded: 2020–2022
- Studios: Konk, London
- Length: 45:30
- Label: BMG
- Producer: Ed Buller

Suede chronology
The Blue Hour (2018)	Autofiction (2022)	Antidepressants (2025)

Singles from Autofiction
- 1. "She Still Leads Me On" Released: 23 May 2022; 2. "15 Again" Released: 8 August 2022; 3. "That Boy on the Stage" Released: 2 September 2022

Autofiction is the ninth studio album by English alternative rock band Suede. The album was released on 16 September 2022 via BMG to critical acclaim. It was their first release in four years, following 2018's The Blue Hour and their first since Night Thoughts in 2016 to feature longtime producer Ed Buller. The album was created as a stylistic distinction from their previous reunion work, which had taken on a more orchestral and cinematic scope.

== Background ==
In November 2020 it was announced that Suede were in the process of recording a ninth studio album. During an interview on the anniversary of Coming Up, lead singer Brett Anderson described the new album's sound as "nasty, brutish and short". Eighteen months after the initial announcement, on 23 May 2022, it was announced that the title of the new album was Autofiction and that it would be released via BGM on 16 September the same year. Alongside this, the title of the album's lead single was revealed to be "She Still Leads Me On". The track, inspired by Anderson's late mother, debuted later that night at a concert in Brussels and was live-streamed to fans via the band's YouTube channel. The album's creation followed the release of Anderson's memoirs, Coal Black Mornings in 2018 and Afternoons with the Blinds Drawn the following year. This informed the lyrics and themes of the album, leading it to have an autobiographical focus. On the title, Anderson stated "Autofiction is a genre that's part memoir, part fiction, to a certain extent, you're manipulating the truth. No art is 100pc truth. Even a memoir in which a writer thinks he's just delivering the nuts and bolts of his life is still making decisions about what they leave out and what they decide to include. At the other end of the spectrum, The Lord of the Rings is the ultimate fantasy book, with its wizards and goblins, but it still contains human truths."

== Recording ==
The album was intended to be recorded live in small venues with the band performing under the assumed name Crushed Kid in order to bring the band's live sound for the record. However, these plans were put on hold due to the COVID-19 pandemic. The album was primarily recorded in London at Air Studios, Konk, Sarm Music Village and Toneville, with additional recording done at RMV Studios, Stockholm, and Studio28, Bangkok. The album was recorded and mixed with a live sound in mind, featuring few overdubs and additional musicians in an attempt to replicate a live performance.

== Release and promotion ==
Brett Anderson stated that: "Every record is a reaction to the last record to some extent. You don't want to just keep going in the same direction. I wanted to come back and make something that felt a little bit more raw, a little bit more angry, a little bit more nasty. Autofiction is our punk record, and we're fucking proud of it."

Autofiction was released 16 September 2022 and charted at No.2 on the UK Albums Chart, with sales of 14,038. The band thus secured their ninth Top 10 album and highest-charting release since 1999's Head Music.

In November 2022 "The Only Way I Can Love You" was added to BBC Radio 2's playlist and "Personality Disorder" to the Radio 6 playlist.

On 8 November 2023 Suede announced Autofiction: Expanded, a 3-disc CD box-set. Disc 1 contains the studio album, disc 2 contains 6 b-sides and bonus tracks, including previously unreleased "There Is No Me If There Is No You", and disc 3 contains the full Autofiction tracklisting recorded live across the band's sold out March 2023 UK tour. This re-issue was released on 8 December 2023.

== Critical reception ==
Professional ratings
Aggregate scores
Source	Rating
AnyDecentMusic?	8.0/10
Metacritic	85/100
Review scores
Source	Rating
AllMusic	4.5/5 stars
Clash	8/10
The Daily Telegraph	4/5 stars
The Guardian	4/5 stars
Mojo	4/5 stars
NME	4/5 stars
PopMatters	8/10
Record Collector	4/5 stars
The Times	4/5 stars
Uncut	8/10

Autofiction received positive reviews from music critics upon its release. At Metacritic, which assigns a weighted mean rating out of 100 to reviews from mainstream critics, the album received an average score of 85, based on 15 reviews, which indicates "Universal acclaim".

Among the positive reviewers was Bella Savignano for Clash. In the article, Savignano called the album "simultaneously forward-looking and nostalgic. It pays homage to the callow naivety of the young band they once were in its thrashing form and gritty sentiment, but with the sonic maturation and profound lyricism of a group who has paid their dues. Though the days of the jangly, innocuous Britpop they were so integral to establishing are gone, Suede haven't lost their roots – they've just re-established them for a new era." Similarly, Phil Mongredien from The Guardian claimed, "there's barely a misstep in Autofiction's 45-minute running time," and that it was "A late-career triumph." Victoria Segal also complimented the album in the review for Mojo, stating that "Autofiction builds its own emotional momentum as Suede, once again, write new chapters of their story."

In the review for NME, Andrew Trendell wrote that the album, "finds the indie greats getting back in the garage to make a racket. This is a band with a lust for life." In Record Collector, Kevin Harley stated that it was, "An album that taps into Suede's galvanic guitar-rock drama without falling prey to that dread declaration of stagnation, the back-to-basics album. Perhaps deceptively, Suede's approach here is forward-thinking." Concluding the review for AllMusic, editor Stephen Thomas Erlewine praised the band's performance; "The last time Suede sounded this muscular and urgent they were still in the process of discovering themselves. Here, the quintet know how to deploy not just their strengths but their distinctive blend of nervy post-punk, overheated glam, and yearning poetry to make an album that sounds full, complete, and utterly alive."

=== Year-end lists ===
Publication	Accolade	Rank	Ref.
The Guardian	The 50 Best Albums of 2022	43	
Louder Than War	Albums of the Year 2022 – The Top 100	1	
Mojo	The 50 Best Albums of 2022	6	
musicOMH	Top 50 Albums of 2022	1	
The Quietus	Top 100 Albums of 2022	17	
Record Collector	Best New Albums of 2022	7	
Uncut	75 Best Albums of 2022	54	
Under the Radar	Top 100 Albums of 2022	29	

== Track listing ==
Standard edition
No.	Title	Writer(s)	Length
1.	"She Still Leads Me On"	Brett Anderson; Richard Oakes	4:09
2.	"Personality Disorder"	Anderson; Oakes; Neil Codling	4:00
3.	"15 Again"	Anderson; Oakes; Codling	3:25
4.	"The Only Way I Can Love You"	Anderson; Oakes; Codling	4:08
5.	"That Boy on the Stage"	Anderson; Oakes; Codling	2:36
6.	"Drive Myself Home"	Anderson; Oakes	4:30
7.	"Black Ice"	Anderson; Oakes	2:45
8.	"Shadow Self"	Anderson; Oakes	3:34
9.	"It's Always the Quiet Ones"	Anderson; Oakes; Codling	4:12
10.	"What Am I Without You?"	Anderson; Oakes	6:18
11.	"Turn Off Your Brain and Yell"	Anderson; Oakes	5:54
Total length:			45:30

Digital deluxe edition
No.	Title	Writer(s)	Length
12.	"Still Waiting"	Anderson; Oakes; Codling	2:50
13.	"The Sadness in You, the Sadness in Me"	Anderson; Oakes; Codling	4:28
14.	"Days Like Dead Moths"	Anderson; Oakes; Codling	3:42
15.	"The Prey"	Anderson; Oakes	3:34

Japanese CD edition
No.	Title	Writer(s)	Length
12.	"You Don't Know Me"	Anderson; Oakes	3:33

Autofiction Expanded

Disc 1: Studio Album
No.	Title	Writer(s)	Length
1.	"She Still Leads Me On"	Brett Anderson; Richard Oakes	4:09
2.	"Personality Disorder"	Anderson; Oakes; Neil Codling	4:00
3.	"15 Again"	Anderson; Oakes; Codling	3:25
4.	"The Only Way I Can Love You"	Anderson; Oakes; Codling	4:08
5.	"That Boy on the Stage"	Anderson; Oakes; Codling	2:36
6.	"Drive Myself Home"	Anderson; Oakes	4:30
7.	"Black Ice"	Anderson; Oakes	2:45
8.	"Shadow Self"	Anderson; Oakes	3:34
9.	"It's Always the Quiet Ones"	Anderson; Oakes; Codling	4:12
10.	"What Am I Without You?"	Anderson; Oakes	6:18
11.	"Turn Off Your Brain and Yell"	Anderson; Oakes	5:54
Total length:			45:30

Disc 2: Extras
No.	Title	Writer(s)	Length
1.	"The Sadness in You, The Sadness in Me"	Anderson; Oakes; Codling	4:31
2.	"Days Like Dead Moths"	Anderson; Oakes; Codling	3:42
3.	"The Prey"	Anderson; Oakes; Codling	3:34
4.	"You Don't Know Me"	Anderson; Oakes	3:33
5.	"There Is No Me If There Is No You"	Anderson; Oakes	3:08
6.	"Still Waiting"	Anderson; Oakes	2:52
Total length:			21:26

Disc 3: Live
No.	Title	Writer(s)	Length
1.	"She Still Leads Me On" (De La Warr Pavilion, Bexhill-on-Sea, 25/3/23)	Anderson; Oakes	4:31
2.	"Personality Disorder" (O2 Academy, Leeds, 30/3/23)	Anderson; Oakes; Codling	3:59
3.	"15 Again" (O2 Academy, Leeds, 30/3/23)	Anderson; Oakes; Codling	3:28
4.	"The Only Way I Can Love You" (O2 Academy, Leeds, 30/3/23)	Anderson; Oakes; Codling	3:55
5.	"That Boy on the Stage" (Rock City, Nottingham, 10/3/23)	Anderson; Oakes; Codling	2:36
6.	"Drive Myself Home" (The Forum, Bath, 3/3/23)	Anderson; Oakes	4:15
7.	"Black Ice" (O2 Guildhall, Southampton, 24/3/23)	Anderson; Oakes	3:23
8.	"Shadow Self" (O2 Academy, Leeds, 30/3/23)	Anderson; Oakes	3:37
9.	"It's Always the Quiet Ones" (Albert Hall, Manchester, 9/3/23)	Anderson; Oakes; Codling	4:18
10.	"What Am I Without You?" (Rock City, Nottingham, 10/3/23)	Anderson; Oakes	6:14
11.	"Turn Off Your Brain and Yell" (De La Warr Pavilion, Bexhill-on-Sea, 25/3/23)	Anderson; Oakes	6:07
Total length:			46:27

== Personnel ==
Suede

- Brett Anderson – vocals
- Richard Oakes – guitars
- Simon Gilbert – drums
- Mat Osman – electric bass
- Neil Codling – synthesizers, piano

Technical

- Ed Buller – production
- Alan Moulder – mixing
- Neil Codling – additional production
- Caesar Edmunds – additional production and mixing

Additional musicians

- Meredith Moore – French horn
- Oli Langford – violins and viola
- Amy Langley – cello

== Charts ==
Chart performance for Autofiction
Chart (2022)	Peak position
Australian Digital Albums (ARIA)	36
Australian Physical Albums (ARIA)	42
Austrian Albums (Ö3 Austria)	34
Belgian Albums (Ultratop Flanders)	15
Belgian Albums (Ultratop Wallonia)	15
Danish Albums (Hitlisten)	15
Dutch Albums (Album Top 100)	11
Finnish Albums (Suomen virallinen lista)	23
French Albums (SNEP)	108
German Albums (Offizielle Top 100)	20
Irish Albums (Official Charts)	26
Italian Albums (FIMI)	88
Portuguese Albums (AFP)	29
Scottish Albums (Official Charts)	3
Spanish Albums (Promusicae)	20
Swedish Albums (Sverigetopplistan)	41
Swiss Albums (Schweizer Hitparade)	49
UK Albums (Official Charts)	2
UK Independent Albums (Official Charts)	1
