= The Blue Hour (album) =

Studio album by Suede
- Released: 21 September 2018
- Recorded: 2017–2018
- Studio: Assault & Battery, London
- Genre: Alternative rock; art rock
- Length: 51:36
- Label: Warner Music UK
- Producer: Alan Moulder

Suede chronology
Night Thoughts (2016)	The Blue Hour (2018)	Autofiction (2022)

Singles from The Blue Hour
- 1. "The Invisibles" Released: 3 June 2018; 2. "Don't Be Afraid If Nobody Loves You" Released: 12 July 2018; 3. "Life Is Golden" Released: 15 August 2018; 4. "Flytipping" Released: 14 September 2018; 5. "Wastelands" Released: 29 October 2018

The Blue Hour is the eighth studio album by English alternative rock band Suede. The album was released on 21 September 2018.

It was the first Suede album since A New Morning not to be produced by longtime producer Ed Buller, and the first to be produced by Alan Moulder. This is their final album to be released under Warner Music.

== Background ==
The concept for The Blue Hour began in May 2016, when lead singer Brett Anderson, guitarist Richard Oakes and keyboardist Neil Codling wrote the song "Mistress"; a song about a boy's realisation of his father's affair. The band then spent eighteen months composing the rest before recording it in six weeks from September to October 2017 at Assault & Battery studios in London with new producer Alan Moulder. The band finished the recording of the album in February 2018, shortly after the recording of orchestra sessions was finished, later finished the mixing in April, announcing the album, release date, tracklisting and artwork at the end of that month along with their testing press of the album at Abbey Road Studios.

== Release and promotion ==
The album was announced on 28 April 2018 with the mysterious title, #Suede8 through their Instagram, before they revealed the official title on 30 April 2018 via a video trailer on their Instagram and YouTube, along with their 2018 UK and Europe Tour.

Just over a week before its release, the band uploaded their final trailer with the backsong "Flytipping" through their social media and YouTube.

The first promotional single, "The Invisibles", was released on 3 June 2018. Second single, "Don't Be Afraid If Nobody Loves You" followed on 12 July. The third, "Life Is Golden" was released on 15 August; its accompanying music video comprises footage of Ukrainian ghost town, Pripyat. Fourth single, "Flytipping" was issued on 14 September. The accompanying music video of "Wastelands" was uploaded on 29 October through their official YouTube channel, and featured the free-runner Robbie Griffith.

The album was released in a number of different versions:

- Standard physical & digital release – contains the album tracks.
- Deluxe Box Set – contains the album tracks on CD and LP, along with a CD of instrumental tracks, a 7" vinyl with the bonus track "Manipulation", a DVD with commentary from the band and Alan Moulder and the entirety of the album's artwork.

The Official Charts Company reported midweek sales of 9,654. It had sold 10,986 units by the end of the week.

== Reception ==
Professional ratings
Aggregate scores
Source	Rating
AnyDecentMusic?	7.6/10
Metacritic	77/100
Review scores
Source	Rating
AllMusic	3.5/5 stars
The Guardian	4/5 stars
The Independent	5/5 stars
The Irish Times	4/5 stars
Mojo	3/5 stars
NME	3/5 stars
Q	3/5 stars
Record Collector	4/5 stars
The Times	4/5 stars
Uncut	8/10

The Blue Hour was released to positive reviews from critics. At Metacritic, which assigns a normalised rating out of 100 to reviews from mainstream critics, The Blue Hour has an average score of 77 based on 16 reviews, indicating "generally favorable reviews".

=== Commercial performance ===
The Blue Hour charted at number five on the UK Albums Chart, which is the highest-charting album by the band since Head Music in 1999. The album has sold 27,396 units as of July 2021 according to the Official Charts Company.

=== Year-end lists ===
Publication	Accolade	Rank	Ref.
Drowned in Sound	Top 15 Albums of 2018	13	
Gigwise	Top 51 Albums of 2018	10	
The Independent	The 40 Best Albums of 2018	35	
Mojo	The 75 Best Albums of 2018	35	
musicOMH	Top 50 Albums of 2018	5	
The Quietus	Top 100 Albums of 2018	4	

== Track listing ==
Standard edition
No.	Title	Writer(s)	Length
1.	"As One"	Brett Anderson; Richard Oakes; Neil Codling	4:10
2.	"Wastelands"	Anderson; Oakes	5:31
3.	"Mistress"	Anderson; Oakes	3:23
4.	"Beyond the Outskirts"	Anderson; Oakes	4:06
5.	"Chalk Circles"	Anderson; Codling	2:04
6.	"Cold Hands"	Anderson; Codling	3:16
7.	"Life Is Golden"	Anderson; Oakes; Codling	3:57
8.	"Roadkill"	Anderson; Codling	2:06
9.	"Tides"	Anderson; Oakes	4:08
10.	"Don't Be Afraid If Nobody Loves You"	Anderson; Oakes	4:24
11.	"Dead Bird"	Anderson; Codling	0:26
12.	"All the Wild Places"	Anderson; Codling	3:15
13.	"The Invisibles"	Anderson; Oakes; Codling	4:09
14.	"Flytipping"	Anderson; Oakes; Codling	6:41
Total length:			51:36

Japanese and deluxe box set bonus CD
No.	Title	Length
1.	"The Blue Hour instrumental"	51:36
Total length:		51:36

Box set 7" vinyl
No.	Title	Length
15.	"Manipulation"	2:05

Box set DVD
No.	Title	Length
1.	"The Blue Hour album band's commentary"
2.	"The Blue Hour Trailer"	0:19
3.	"The Invisibles" (promo video)	4:14
4.	"Don't Be Afraid If Nobody Loves You" (promo video)	4:30

== Personnel ==
Suede

- Brett Anderson – vocals
- Richard Oakes – guitar
- Simon Gilbert – drums
- Mat Osman – bass guitar
- Neil Codling – synthesiser, piano

Technical

- Alan Moulder – production, mixing
- Neil Codling – additional production
- Caesar Edmunds – engineering
- Richie Kennedy – engineering assistance (recording)
- Tom Herbert – engineering assistance (mix)
- Geoff Pesche – mastering

Spoken Word

- Jasmine Hyde (1, 2 & 9)
- Jordan Aniseed (1 & 9)
- Jay Pickles (1)
- Mitch Kieries (1)
- Duncan Rosaline (5 & 11)
- Brett Anderson (11)

Orchestra
(on tracks 1–3, 7, 8, 11–14)

- City of Prague Philharmonic Orchestra
- Guy Protheroe – conducting
- Lucie Švehlová – concertmaster
- Neil Codling – arrangement (except on track 13)
- Richard Oakes – arrangement (on track 3)
- Oli Langford – arrangement (on track 8)
- Craig Armstrong – arrangement (on track 13)
- Vitek Kral – recording engineering
- Michael Hradiský – assistant engineering

== Charts ==
Chart (2018)	Peak position
Austrian Albums (Ö3 Austria)	58
Belgian Albums (Ultratop Flanders)	33
Belgian Albums (Ultratop Wallonia)	29
Czech Albums (ČNS IFPI)	49
Dutch Albums (Album Top 100)	52
Finnish Albums (Suomen virallinen lista)	37
German Albums (Offizielle Top 100)	32
Hungarian Albums (MAHASZ)	37
Irish Albums (IRMA)	22
Italian Albums (FIMI)	40
Japanese Albums (Oricon)	58
Portuguese Albums (AFP)	38
Scottish Albums (OCC)	7
Spanish Albums (PROMUSICAE)	11
Swedish Albums (Sverigetopplistan)	48
Swiss Albums (Schweizer Hitparade)	44
UK Albums (OCC)	5
