= The Wild Ones (song) =

1994 single by Suede

Single by Suede

from the album Dog Man Star
- B-side: "Modern Boys"; "This World Needs a Father"; "Eno's Introducing the Band"; "Asda Town"
- Released: 7 November 1994
- Studio: Master Rock (London, England)
- Genre: Britpop
- Length: 4:50
- Label: Nude
- Songwriters: Brett Anderson; Bernard Butler
- Producer: Ed Buller

Suede singles chronology
"We Are the Pigs" (1994)	"The Wild Ones" (1994)	"New Generation" (1995)

"The Wild Ones" is the second single from the album Dog Man Star by English rock band Suede, released on 7 November 1994 through Nude Records. The song peaked at number 18 on the UK Singles Chart and number six in Iceland.

== Background ==
The ballad is considered a favourite among fans and is one of their most notable songs of this period. Brett Anderson has said on numerous occasions that he regards this song as not only the high-water mark of his writing partnership with Bernard Butler, but his favourite of all Suede songs. The song is one of several notable Suede songs including "So Young" and "Stay Together", which were inspired by Anderson's ex-girlfriend Anick. Unlike most other songs on Dog Man Star, which were recorded using Butler’s signature Gibson ES-355, "The Wild Ones" was one of only 2 songs from the 17 recorded during the sessions on which Butler used a Fender Telecaster as the primary electric guitar. Albeit, the intro was recorded on a Dobro Resonator guitar on the roof of Butler’s father’s Saab outside Master Rock Studios.

The B-side, "Modern Boys", appears as an album track in the US and Japanese editions of Dog Man Star. The single also features a version of "Introducing the Band" by electronic pioneer Brian Eno. Another B-side, "This World Needs a Father" is the only Suede song to feature input from both Bernard Butler and Richard Oakes. While the band were putting the final touches to the album, producer Ed Buller felt that the song needed more work and offered new guitarist Oakes to play Hammond organ.

== Music video ==
"The Wild Ones" music video was filmed in Dartmoor and was directed by Howard Greenhalgh. The band met Greenhalgh at the MTV Video Music Awards in New York on a promo trip, where he won best video for Soundgarden's "Black Hole Sun". One of the band's few big-budget videos, it cost £150,000, most of it for computer special effects. Although Anderson is a fan of the song, he dislikes the music video. While promoting album Night Thoughts in 2016, he said: "That [video] really annoys me, because it's the greatest song Suede ever wrote, and it's got this awful video. It makes me shiver. That fucking video gives me night thoughts."

== Reception and legacy ==
Music writer James Masterton was very favourable, writing: "Easily one of the greatest records the band will release in their entire career, The Wild Ones is a haunting ballad, sparsely produced and exploiting the quirks in Brett Anderson's voice to the full." Music & Media wrote: "For the first time, the Anderson assembly live up to their name. Semi-acoustic with violins and all, bad ass Brett recalls forgotten heroes like Ian McCulloch and Scott Walker." Linda Ryan of the Gavin Report felt the song marked a major change in the band's songwriting, by evoking classic country songwriters' tales of "what might've beens." She considered it a "more serious songwriting effort... a far cry from the tawdry lust that clung to many songs on the band's debut. Just beautiful." Steve Baltin of Cash Box felt the band had undergone a "metamorphosing" compared to the band's early work. As well as the early Bowie influence, he felt they incorporated the sound of U2, writing: "The band wears the changes well, creating a song that has more sustenance than previous works... the group deserve credit for credibly reinventing themselves."

John Robinson of NME said that "rather than loudly slapping its arse and screeching at us in a wobbly falsetto, ['The Wild Ones'] is full of a sort of quiet grandeur. It has references, of course - the poise and conception of classic Bowie - but where Suede often excel at huge concepts ('Still Life', 'Stay Together'), this is remarkable for its tone of muted expectation." In reference to the band split during the summer, Robinson added: "Possibly the best song of the week, but this week, the band recorded here really no longer exists." Patrick Brennan of Hot Press was highly critical of the song. He wrote: "The only thing that saves this overblown farce is the understated and anti-melodic guitar playing of Bernard Butler. 'The Wild Ones' is infantile and ultimately meaningless, with a calculated teeny-bopper yearning, and even the orchestral arrangements of Brian Gascoigne, of Scott Walker's Climate of Hunter fame, can't save it. About as wild as a storm in a tea cup."

BBC America wrote a favourable retrospective review in 2008. Kevin Wicks said "[the song] is like a Britpop take on a mournful country-and-western tune. The lyrics are beautiful and poetic, and Anderson's low register has a Johnny Cash quality that is very expressive. Wonderful song." In 2014, NME ranked the song at number 370 on its list of the "500 Greatest Songs of All Time". Canadian rock band Destroyer, named their 2017 album ken after the song's original title.

== Track listings ==
All songs were written by Brett Anderson and Bernard Butler except where noted.

UK CD1

1. "The Wild Ones"
2. "Modern Boys"
3. "This World Needs a Father"

UK CD2

1. "The Wild Ones"
2. "Eno's Introducing the Band"
3. "Asda Town" (Anderson)

UK 12-inch single

A. "The Wild Ones"
B. "Eno's Introducing the Band"

UK cassette single

1. "The Wild Ones"
2. "Modern Boys"

European CD single

1. "The Wild Ones" – 4:50
2. "Killing of a Flash Boy" – 4:07

Australian CD single

1. "The Wild Ones"
2. "Killing of a Flash Boy"
3. "Whipsnade"

== Charts ==
Chart (1994)	Peak position
Australia (ARIA)	167
Europe (Eurochart Hot 100)	66
Europe (European Hit Radio)	40
Iceland (Íslenski Listinn Topp 40)	6
Israel (IBA)	25
Scotland Singles (Official Charts)	16
UK Singles (Official Charts)	18
UK Indie (Music Week)	1
