= Bloodsports (album) =

Studio album by Suede
- Released: 18 March 2013
- Recorded: 2012
- Genre: Alternative rock; glam pop
- Length: 39:46
- Label: Warner Bros.
- Producer: Ed Buller

Suede chronology
The Best of Suede (2010)	Bloodsports (2013)	Night Thoughts (2016)

Singles from Bloodsports
- 1. "It Starts and Ends with You" Released: 4 February 2013; 2. "Hit Me" Released: 27 May 2013; 3. "For the Strangers" Released: 21 October 2013

Bloodsports is the sixth studio album by English alternative rock band Suede. It was released on 18 March 2013, via Warner Bros. Records. It is their first studio album since A New Morning in 2002.

The album was the first since Coming Up to be produced by their longtime producer Ed Buller, and also the first album to feature keyboardist Neil Codling since his departure in 2001.

== Background and production ==
Frontman Brett Anderson commented that the album would sound like a cross between Dog Man Star and Coming Up. He stated that Bloodsports is "about lust, it's about the chase, it's about the endless carnal game of love. It was possibly the hardest we've ever made but certainly the most satisfying".

The band performed new material in 2011, most of which got scrapped when they went into the studio with Ed Buller, the producer of their first three albums.

== Release ==
In January 2013, Suede released a free download of opening track "Barriers". The lead single, "It Starts and Ends with You", followed in February. Second single "Hit Me" was released 27 May. Third single "For the Strangers" was released in October on the same day the band released The Vinyl Collection, a box set of the band's six studio albums and b-side collection on vinyl. Bloodsports debuted on the Official UK Albums Chart at number 10, on first-week sales of 10,453 copies. It went on to sell 22,410 units after 12 weeks. A 7-inch double a-side of "Barriers"/"Animal Nitrate" was released 20 April on Record Store Day.

== Critical reception ==
Professional ratings
Aggregate scores
Source	Rating
AnyDecentMusic?	7.3/10
Metacritic	80/100
Review scores
Source	Rating
AllMusic	4/5 stars
The Daily Telegraph	5/5 stars
The Guardian	4/5 stars
The Independent	3/5 stars
Mojo	4/5 stars
NME	7/10
Pitchfork	7.6/10
Q	4/5 stars
Rolling Stone	3.5/5 stars
Uncut	7/10

Bloodsports has been very well received by critics, their most acclaimed album since Coming Up in 1996. At Metacritic, which assigns a rating out of 100 to reviews from mainstream critics, the album received an average score of 80, based on 29 reviews, indicating "generally favourable reviews".

=== Year-end lists ===
Bloodsports has been included in many Best Albums of 2013 lists including:

Publication	Country	Accolade	Year	Rank
ABC News	US	The 50 Best Albums of 2013	2013	29
AllMusic	US	Best of 2013 – Top 50 Albums	2013	N/A
PopMatters	US	The 75 Best Albums of the Year	2013	57
Q	UK	50 Albums of the Year	2013	22
The Quietus	UK	Albums of the Year	2013	42
Rough Trade	UK	Top 100 Albums of the Year	2013	67
Under the Radar	US	Top 125 Albums of 2013	2013	23

== Track listing ==
No.	Title	Writer(s)	Length
1.	"Barriers"	Brett Anderson; Richard Oakes; Neil Codling	3:42
2.	"Snowblind"	Anderson; Oakes	4:03
3.	"It Starts and Ends with You"	Anderson; Codling	3:51
4.	"Sabotage"	Anderson; Codling	3:45
5.	"For the Strangers"	Anderson; Oakes; Codling	4:12
6.	"Hit Me"	Anderson; Oakes; Codling	4:03
7.	"Sometimes I Feel I'll Float Away"	Anderson; Oakes	4:12
8.	"What Are You Not Telling Me?"	Anderson; Oakes; Codling	3:12
9.	"Always"	Anderson; Oakes; Codling; Simon Gilbert; Mat Osman	4:42
10.	"Faultlines"	Anderson; Oakes; Codling	4:05

iTunes deluxe edition and Australia CD bonus tracks
No.	Title	Writer(s)	Length
11.	"Dawn Chorus"	Anderson; Oakes	4:03
12.	"Howl"	Anderson; Osman	3:35

Japan bonus tracks
No.	Title	Writer(s)	Length
11.	"Dawn Chorus"	Anderson; Oakes	4:03
12.	"Nothing Can Stop Us"	Anderson; Oakes; Codling	3:35

Box set bonus tracks
No.	Title	Writer(s)	Length
11.	"Dawn Chorus"	Anderson; Oakes	4:03
12.	"No Holding Back"	Anderson; Oakes; Codling	3:52

== Personnel ==
Suede

- Brett Anderson – vocals
- Richard Oakes – guitars
- Simon Gilbert – drums
- Mat Osman – electric bass
- Neil Codling – synthesisers, guitars

Technical

- Ed Buller – production, engineering
- Andy Hughes – engineering
- Paul-Édouard Laurendeau – engineering
- Joel M. Peters – engineering assistance
- Andy Wallace – mixing
- Paul Suarez – Pro Tools engineering
- Howie Weinberg – mastering
- Dan Gerbarg – mastering

Artwork

- Jonathan Baron – cover
- Matthew Holroyd – cover
- Brett Anderson – cover
- Mat Osman – cover
- Blommers/Schumm – artwork photography
- Roger Sargent – band photography
- Studio-Baron – design

== Charts ==
Chart performance for Bloodsports
Chart (2013)	Peak position
Australian Albums (ARIA)	181
Belgian Albums (Ultratop Flanders)	74
Belgian Albums (Ultratop Wallonia)	77
Danish Albums (Hitlisten)	12
Dutch Albums (Album Top 100)	65
French Albums (SNEP)	97
German Albums (Offizielle Top 100)	95
Irish Albums (IRMA)	22
Norwegian Albums (VG-lista)	18
Scottish Albums (OCC)	15
Spanish Albums (Promusicae)	36
Swedish Albums (Sverigetopplistan)	32
UK Albums (OCC)	10
UK Independent Albums (OCC)	2
