= Night Thoughts (album) =

Album by Suede

Studio album by Suede
- Released: 22 January 2016
- Recorded: 2014
- Genres: Alternative rock; art rock; Britpop
- Length: 47:39
- Label: Warner Music UK
- Producers: Ed Buller; Neil Codling (add.)

Suede chronology
Bloodsports (2013)	Night Thoughts (2016)	The Blue Hour (2018)

Singles from Night Thoughts
- 1. "Outsiders" Released: 24 September 2015; 2. "Like Kids" Released: 1 December 2015; 3. "What I'm Trying To Tell You" Released: 29 February 2016

Night Thoughts is the seventh studio album by English alternative rock band Suede. Produced by long-time collaborator Ed Buller, the album was released through Warner Music UK on 22 January 2016 to widespread critical acclaim. It was accompanied by a feature film, directed by Roger Sargent. During their 2016 tour the band performed from behind a screen on which Sargent's film was projected during the first half of their set. The album is considered by many critics to be the band's finest work since 1994's Dog Man Star.

== Background and production ==
In January 2014 vocalist Brett Anderson revealed that Suede were in the middle of the writing process for a new album. Anderson mentioned that the band "want to carry on writing and pushing forward, so we're taking it somewhere else now." In March, keyboardist Neil Codling posted that Suede were in the studio recording the follow-up to Bloodsports (2013). The album, which was recorded in London and Brussels, features a full string section. The majority of the album was recorded in Belgium in one session, "record[ing] all the music [...] as one piece". Recording was produced by Ed Buller. The album was initially planned for release in 2015. Anderson explained the band wanted to "go somewhere else with [Night Thoughts], to make something with a bit more scope."

== Composition ==
Codling compared "Outsiders" to the likes of "Trash" and "Beautiful Ones", calling it "a rallying cry for the excluded."

Mat Osman talked about the writing process:

"Neil and Richard pretty much wrote a record, they wrote about 45 minutes of music, lots of which ran into each other and lots of different themes re-emerged. We went to Belgium which were we started recording and basically recorded everything without Brett having any melodies or any words, which he’s never done before, so it was a bit of a leap in the dark. And then he sat down to write to the whole thing and we had no idea if it was going to work, it hasn’t ended up the same, uh since then we‘ve added about 4 songs and cut quite a lot of it and moved stuff around. It always started off as a record that was influenced by film music and stuff like that, the way you can have quite meandering pieces and scenes that reemerge, theres lots of stuff on the record that is made up of bits and pieces of other songs."

== Release ==
In February 2015 Suede debuted "What I'm Trying to Tell You" live while at the NME Awards. On 7 September, Night Thoughts was announced for release. The band performed the whole album in full on 13 and 14 November 2015 at London Roundhouse. These dates also serve as the premiere of the Night Thoughts film, which played in the background behind the band. The DVD version of the film is included in a special edition of the Night Thoughts LP.

On the press release, director Sargent stated:

"The record deals with a lot of familial themes – life, death, love, anguish and despair; themes that are expanded upon in its visual companion, providing a study of how those elements affect the human psyche. It resonated with me for many reasons, not least because my mother passed away a few days after I started writing a story for the film. The film starts with a man drowning in the waters of a deserted beach at night, as he fights for life, his mind plays out the events that lead him to be there."

On 2 September 2015 the band released a teaser video that was thought to be leading to a new album. Bassist Mat Osman linked to this video from Twitter with the caption "It begins". A trailer for the film and the album was released on 7 September. On 24 September, "Outsiders" was made available for streaming. Night Thoughts was released on 22 January 2016. It was promoted with a series of in-store acoustic gigs, including a session at HMV, Oxford Street in London.

The album peaked at no. 6 on the UK Albums Chart; and as of September 2018, has recorded UK sales of 29,117, according to the Official Charts Company.

== Critical reception ==
Professional ratings
Aggregate scores
Source	Rating
AnyDecentMusic?	7.5/10
Metacritic	80/100
Review scores
Source	Rating
AllMusic	4.5/5 stars
The Daily Telegraph	5/5 stars
The Guardian	4/5 stars
The Independent	4/5 stars
Mojo	4/5 stars
NME	4/5
Pitchfork	7.5/10
Q	4/5 stars
Rolling Stone	3.5/5 stars
Spin	8/10

Night Thoughts received positive reviews from music critics. At Metacritic, which assigns a normalized rating out of 100 to reviews from critics, the album received an average score of 80, which indicates "generally favourable reviews", based on 29 reviews. AllMusic senior critic Stephen Thomas Erlewine praised the album, stating: "With that past behind them, Suede can still dwell on big issues of love and mortality, but now that the past is in perspective, it all means a little bit more and what lies ahead is a little more precious, and that wide view makes Night Thoughts all the more moving." Writing for Exclaim!, Cam Lindsay stated: "Suede establish and uphold the album's gravitas with the type of symphonic grandiosity we've come to anticipate from them." The Guardian's Caroline Sullivan praised the album, calling it "another victory for the misfits." Andy Gill of The Independent wrote: "'How long will it take to break the plans that I never make?' It’s a question that was inevitably begged by those previous celebrations of low-rent outlaw glamour, and, in attempting to answer it, Suede may have made their best album." Consequence of Sound's John Hadusek thought that the record "finds a middleground between the guitar pop of the Coming Up era and the moodier textures of Dog Man Star," and regarded it as "a fine entry in their already strong discography."

Pitchfork critic Stuart Berman was positive in his assessment of the album, stating: "With Night Thoughts Suede once again leap up off the dancefloor to swing from the chandeliers." Berman further stated that the record "isn’t a rock opera per se, though it gamely assumes the form of one." The Quietus' Luke Turner thought that musically, the album "is the most solid and focussed-sounding album Suede have ever realised" and commented: "It certainly is the sound of a band stepping out of their own shadow to finally be all they can be." Rachel Brodsky of Spin wrote: "Night Thoughts honors Suede’s longstanding place in Brit-rock history as theatrical brooders with a penchant for pop and post-punk, while also celebrating the five-piece’s growth by supplying listeners with another round of swirling dance ballads and operatic, Dog Man Star-ry ruminations." Rolling Stone's Ashley Zlatopolsky described the record as the band's "most cohesive album to date, putting a decisively modern twist on their definitive Brit-pop."

Salon included the album in its list of the 14 "criminally underrated albums" of the year. Annie Zaleski felt that, although the album lacked the pop hooks of Bloodsports, the album had its own merits in "rich orchestral flourishes, dramatic guitar arpeggios and vocalist Brett Anderson’s still-pristine, theatrical croon."

=== Year-end lists ===
Publication	Country	Accolade	Year	Rank
Drowned in Sound	UK	16 Best Albums of 2016	2016	10
Esquire	UK	20 Best Albums of 2016	2016	*
Fopp	UK	100 Best Albums of 2016	2016	28
Flavorwire	US	10 Best Albums of 2016	2016	*
Gigwise	UK	51 Best Albums of 2016	2016	3
Louder Than War	UK	50 Best Albums of 2016	2016	44
Mojo	UK	50 Albums of the Year	2016	33
musicOMH	UK	50 Best Albums of 2016	2016	39
The Quietus	UK	100 Best Albums of 2016	2016	36
Radio X	UK	25 Best Albums of 2016	2016	*
The Daily Telegraph	UK	Best Albums of 2016	2016	*
Wales Arts Review	UK	50 Best Albums of 2016	2016	26

== Track listing ==
Disc one: Music (Standard Edition)
No.	Title	Writer(s)	Length
1.	"When You Are Young"	Brett Anderson; Neil Codling	4:18
2.	"Outsiders"	Anderson; Codling	3:53
3.	"No Tomorrow"	Anderson; Richard Oakes	3:51
4.	"Pale Snow"	Anderson; Oakes; Codling	2:42
5.	"I Don't Know How to Reach You"	Anderson; Oakes; Codling	6:12
6.	"What I'm Trying to Tell You"	Anderson; Oakes; Codling	4:11
7.	"Tightrope"	Anderson; Codling	3:51
8.	"Learning to Be"	Anderson; Oakes	3:21
9.	"Like Kids"	Anderson; Oakes	3:36
10.	"I Can't Give Her What She Wants"	Anderson; Oakes	4:45
11.	"When You Were Young"	Anderson; Codling	2:19
12.	"The Fur and the Feathers"	Anderson; Oakes; Codling	4:40

Disc two: Film (Deluxe Edition only)
No.	Title	Length
1.	"Film"	52:10
2.	"Trailer"	1:07
3.	"Teaser"	0:20
4.	"Outsiders" (music video)	4:12

== Personnel ==
=== Music ===
Suede

- Brett Anderson – vocals
- Richard Oakes – guitars
- Simon Gilbert – drums
- Mat Osman – electric bass
- Neil Codling – synthesisers, piano

Additional musicians

- Oli Langford – strings arrangement; violin and viola (tracks 1, 7, 11)
- Danny Keane – cello (tracks 1, 7, 11)
- Tom Fry – double bass (tracks 1, 7, 11)
- James Mainwaring – baritone saxophone (tracks 1, 7, 11)
- Gita Langley – additional vocals (track 8)
- Abdallah, Damiano, Bram, Isobel, Ella, Katy, Lottie, Clare, Celine, Sylvie, Daisy, Megan and Thalia of Malorees Junior School, Kilburn – additional vocals (track 9)

Technical

- Ed Buller – production
- Andy Hughes – engineering
- Paul-Edouard Laurendeau – engineering
- Joel M. Peters – engineering assistance
- Neil Codling – additional production
- Cenzo Townshend – mixing
- Tony Cousins – mastering

Artwork

- Paul Khera – art direction, domestic interior photography and design
- Brett Anderson – art direction
- Mat Osman – art direction
- Neil Codling – art direction
- Didz Hammond – art direction
- Lucy Ray – underwater photography

=== Film ===
Cast

- Alex Walton as Bryn
- Jane E. Walsh as Sasha
- Gabe Trimble as Cian
- Paul Dewdney as Bryn's father
- Tim Parker as Sasha's father

Production

- Roger Sargent – direction
- Stephanie De Giorgio – writing
- Janna Barlett – executive production
- Callum Gordon – executive production
- Alex Ashman – production
- Elena Carmen – editing
- Gabi Norland – direction of photography
- Eric Hart – camera assistance
- Anna Balchin – production assistance
- Claire Warr – production assistance

== Charts ==
Chart (2016)	Peak position
Australian Albums (ARIA)	134
Austrian Albums (Ö3 Austria)	72
Belgian Albums (Ultratop Flanders)	29
Belgian Albums (Ultratop Wallonia)	35
Croatian International Albums (HDU)	2
Danish Albums (Hitlisten)	22
Dutch Albums (Album Top 100)	23
French Albums (SNEP)	64
German Albums (Offizielle Top 100)	31
Hungarian Albums (MAHASZ)	11
Irish Albums (IRMA)	14
Italian Albums (FIMI)	54
Japanese Albums (Oricon)	34
Norwegian Albums (VG-lista)	25
Portuguese Albums (AFP)	40
Spanish Albums (Promusicae)	26
Swedish Albums (Sverigetopplistan)	37
Swiss Albums (Schweizer Hitparade)	71
UK Albums (Official Charts)	6
US Heatseekers Albums (Billboard)	10
