= Closer (band) =

American four-piece rock band

Closer was an American four-piece rock band from New York City. The band's members were Harley Di Nardo (vocals, guitars), Derrek Hawkins (guitars), David Cartategui (bass) and Jonathan Nanberg (drums). The band was founded in the late 1990s as Velour. The band played in numerous music venues within New York City, such as The Continental, Coney Island High, CBGBs, Mercury Lounge and The Spiral Lounge. They then caught the attention of Revolution/Giant Records, a Warner Bros Records imprint label.

After performing for Revolution/Giant Records, record producer Ed Buller produced their debut release. Recording started in late 1996 at The Record Plant in Sausalito, California and, in September 1997, Don't Walk was released. Don't Walk reflects the band's musical influences, such as British glitter rock artists of the 1970s and Britpop acts of the 1990s.

Shortly after releasing Don't Walk, the band toured with Love Spit Love, Supergrass and Chumbawamba.
