= Saturday Night (Suede song) =

1997 single by Suede

Single by Suede

from the album Coming Up
- B-side: "W.S.D."; "Jumble Sale Mums"; "This Time"; "Picnic by the Motorway" (live)
- Released: 13 January 1997
- Length: 4:32
- Label: Nude
- Songwriters: Brett Anderson; Richard Oakes
- Producer: Ed Buller

Suede singles chronology
| "Beautiful Ones" (1996) | "Saturday Night" (1997) | "Lazy" (1997) |

"Saturday Night" is the third single from English rock band Suede's third studio album, Coming Up (1996), released on 13 January 1997 through Nude Records. The single continued the success of Suede's previous two hits by entering the top 10 of the UK Singles Chart, peaking at number six. Outside the UK, the song peaked at number one in Iceland, number seven in Finland, number eight in Denmark, and number 11 in Sweden.

== Critical reception ==
A reviewer from Music Week rated the song three out of five, adding, "Evoking the melody of Elton John's Song For Guy, this slowie lacks the anthemic quality of many of their previous ballads, but fans will buy for the bonus tracks." Ben Marshall in The Guardian was unforgiving in his review of the song. He said that [Anderson's] "lyrics are a dreary and breathtakingly desperate attempt to prove that he's had it and done it." Noting the similarity with the song's melody to Eric Clapton's "Wonderful Tonight", he said that "Suede are as mindless and self-serving as an ancient, arid sponge." Music writer James Masterton said that "the plaintive Saturday Night evokes memories of their 1994 hit Wild Ones and surely ranks alongside it as one of the best singles they have ever released."

== Music video ==
The accompanying music video for the song was directed by Pedro Romhanyi, who previously made videos for the band's songs "Animal Nitrate" and "Beautiful Ones". The clip stars British actress Keeley Hawes. It was shot in the London Underground at a disused Piccadilly line platform at Aldwych station. Aldwych station is notable as the only platform in London's underground network where filming is allowed.

== Track listings ==
All songs were written by Brett Anderson and Richard Oakes except where noted.

UK CD1

1. "Saturday Night"
2. "W.S.D." (Anderson)
3. "Jumble Sale Mums"

UK CD2

1. "Saturday Night"
2. "This Time"
3. "Saturday Night" (original demo)

UK 2×7-inch single

A. "Saturday Night"
B. "This Time"
C. "Beautiful Ones"
D. "Sound of the Streets"

UK cassette single

1. "Saturday Night"
2. "Picnic by the Motorway" (live)

European CD single

1. "Saturday Night" – 4:34
2. "This Time" – 5:46

Japanese CD single

1. "Saturday Night"
2. "W.S.D." (Anderson)
3. "Jumble Sale Mums"
4. "This Time"
5. "Saturday Night" (original demo)

== Charts ==
=== Weekly charts ===
| Chart (1997) | Peak position |
|---|---|
| Denmark (IFPI) | 8 |
| Europe (Eurochart Hot 100) | 46 |
| Finland (Suomen virallinen lista) | 7 |
| Iceland (Íslenski Listinn Topp 40) | 1 |
| Israel (IBA) | 10 |
| Scotland Singles (Official Charts) | 10 |
| Sweden (Sverigetopplistan) | 11 |
| UK Singles (Official Charts) | 6 |
| UK Indie (Music Week) | 1 |

=== Year-end charts ===
| Chart (1997) | Position |
|---|---|
| Iceland (Íslenski Listinn Topp 40) | 51 |
| UK Singles (OCC) | 195 |

== Release history ==
| Region | Date | Format(s) | Label(s) | Ref. |
|---|---|---|---|---|
| United Kingdom | 13 January 1997 | CD; cassette | Nude | |
| United Kingdom | 27 January 1997 | 2×7-inch vinyl | Nude | |
| Japan | 26 February 1997 | CD | Nude | |
