= Trash (Suede song) =

1996 single by Suede

Single by Suede

from the album Coming Up
- B-side: "Europe Is Our Playground"; "Every Monday Morning Comes"; "Have You Ever Been This Low?"; "Another No-One"
- Released: 29 July 1996
- Genre: Britpop
- Length: 4:06
- Label: Nude
- Songwriters: Brett Anderson; Richard Oakes
- Producer: Ed Buller

Suede singles chronology
"New Generation" (1995)	"Trash" (1996)	"Beautiful Ones" (1996)

Music video
- "Trash" on YouTube

"Trash" is the first single from English rock band Suede's third studio album, Coming Up (1996). Released on 29 July 1996 via Nude Records, "Trash" was the first single on which all the songs were written without guitarist Bernard Butler, since Richard Oakes had taken his place. The single is tied with "Stay Together" as the band's highest-charting single on the UK Singles Chart, peaking at number three; however, it outsold the earlier single, thus making it their biggest-selling single. Outside the UK, the song topped the Finnish Singles Chart and reached the top five in Denmark, Iceland, and Sweden. Melody Maker ranked "Trash" number four in their list of "Singles of the Year" in 1996.

== Song meaning ==
Various meanings have been given to the song, but the main themes seem to be about 'outsiders', being different but living well with it. In a 2013 interview, Anderson expanded this theme, saying: "It's a song that's kind of about being in the band and, by extension, it's a song about the fans and the whole kind of ethos of being a Suede... person." He also described it as the soundtrack to his life, saying "It's about believing in the romance of the everyday." In an interview in late 2009, for the SkyArts' Songbook series, Anderson said about the song:

I actually wrote it about the band Suede. It's a celebration of the band, but by extension, it's a celebration of the fans as well. And it was a kind of a song written about us, as a gang, it was written about the values we stood for. And even though it sounds like a love song, it was actually about the idea of the identity of the band, and what they stood for.

== Critical reception ==
The song proved to be a successful comeback single for Suede, receiving praise from critics. NME featured Suede on the front cover of the 27 July 1996 issue for an interview promoting their latest comeback. Ted Kessler said: "So the scaremongers were wrong. Brett Anderson is the creative force behind Suede. Here's the proof: this week sees the release of their first post-Bernard Butler single and nobody can really admit that they thought it would sound half as good as it does." He added: "’Trash’, for that is the single, kicks into touch the dark introspection of their last output, the Dog Man Star album, with a flamboyant explosion of space-pop guitars and high-octane Brettswail that flutters the senses, quickens the pulse and gladdens the heart like a cheap night out on expensive drugs." Kevin Courtney of The Irish Times said it is "probably their most direct and immediate pop statement to date."

Melody Maker had proclaimed the song "single of the week" a fortnight prior to release. Tania Branigan called it "bitterly sweet, a love song for strangers; fast, in every sense of the word." In reference to the single's B-sides, she said: "In the finest 'Drowners' tradition, the two B-sides are almost finer." Pan-European magazine Music & Media wrote, "They haven't lost their camp, dramatic touch (piped strings!), distorted guitars and strong melodies. Great summer record." Music Week rated it five out of five, and also they picked it as Single of the Week. The reviewer noted, "This return single finds Suede at their most flamboyant with Brett Anderson's deliciously Bowie-like vocals stealing the show over an adventurous arrangement. This should be their biggest hit to date and augurs very well for their September album." The magazine's Alan Jones declared it "their most disciplined and direct pop nugget to date", "hugely commercial, and likely to be their biggest hit yet."

George Byrne of the Irish Independent had high praise for the single, writing: "The four songs which make up the 'Trash' EP (Nude) are the most uncluttered and focused since their first three singles, dipping back into glam rock with a vengeance. The title track is glorious, a robust romp with a keyboard intro reminiscent of Bowie's 'Heroes' as Anderson leerily lolls with the lyrical lowlife." James Bennett of The Telegraph felt the song could reach number one due to the lack of competition from fellow Britpop bands on its release. On the single, he wrote: "This time round, public acceptance may be added to critical acclaim because the comeback single, Trash, is instant, flawless, three-minute essence-of-pop, as irresistible as 'Satisfaction' or 'Ride a White Swan'." He added: "Brett Anderson's acutely mannered vocal [...] gels with Richard Oakes' insistent guitar to weave a magic reminiscent of the soaring romanticism conjured by Bowie and Fripp on 'Heroes'." Music writer James Masterton felt the single "lacks something of the strength of melody that characterised many of their previous recordings and which elevated them to the status of instant classics."

== Music video ==
The music video for the song was filmed at Elstree Studios and directed by David Mould. It features the whole band performing in a crowded, up-market bar decorated in garish primary colours among people in glamorous, high-end fashions of the day. The video also marks the first appearance of a new band member, keyboard player Neil Codling.

== Accolades ==
In December 1996, Melody Maker ranked "Trash" number four in their list of "Singles of the Year". A 2014 poll by US music magazine Paste marking the 20th anniversary of Britpop listed "Trash" at number 14 in its list, "The 50 Best Britpop Songs." Michael Danaher wrote: "The song is a festering, anthemic pop gem that featuring a glorious chorus and guitar and synth-driven rhythm. A vastly underrated song this side of the Atlantic." In a public poll by NME, "Trash" was placed at number nine on its list of the "50 Greatest Britpop Songs Ever", saying: "with 'Trash', Suede made being a glam weirdo seem like the most appealing thing in the world."

== Versions ==
A different version of the song appears on the group's 2003 compilation album, Singles, where the vocals were re-recorded along with an alternative ending. All four of the singles' B-sides were included on Suede's compilation Sci-Fi Lullabies, which was released the following year, although the version of "Europe is our Playground" was a new version and not the original B-side version found here. "Europe is Our Playground" also marks the songwriting debut of bass guitarist Mat Osman.

== Track listings ==
All songs were written by Brett Anderson and Richard Oakes except where noted.

- UK 7-inch and cassette single
1. "Trash"
2. "Europe Is Our Playground" (Anderson, Mat Osman)
- UK CD1 and Australian CD single
1. "Trash"
2. "Europe Is Our Playground" (Anderson, Osman)
3. "Every Monday Morning Comes"
- UK CD2
1. "Trash"
2. "Have You Ever Been This Low?"
3. "Another No-One" (Anderson)
- European maxi-CD single
1. "Trash"
2. "Europe Is Our Playground" (Anderson, Osman)
3. "Every Monday Morning Comes"
4. "Another No-One" (Anderson)
- Japanese EP
1. "Trash"
2. "Europe Is Our Playground" (Anderson, Osman)
3. "Every Monday Morning Comes"
4. "Have You Ever Been This Low?"
5. "Another No One" (Anderson)

== Charts ==
=== Weekly charts ===
Charts (1996)	Peak position
Australia (ARIA)	119
Belgium (Ultratip Bubbling Under Flanders)	15
Canada Rock/Alternative (RPM)	16
Denmark (IFPI)	3
Europe (Eurochart Hot 100)	19
Finland (Suomen virallinen lista)	1
Iceland (Íslenski Listinn Topp 40)	2
Ireland (IRMA)	19
Israel (IBA)	8
Netherlands (Single Top 100 Tipparade)	15
Norway (VG-lista)	12
Quebec (ADISQ)	18
Scottish Singles Sales (Official Charts)	3
Sweden (Sverigetopplistan)	5
UK Singles (Official Charts)	3
UK Indie (Music Week)	1

=== Year-end charts ===
Charts (1996)	Position
Iceland (Íslenski Listinn Topp 40)	18
Sweden (Topplistan)	55

== Certifications ==
Region	Certification	Certified units/sales
United Kingdom (BPI)	Silver	200,000^{‡}
^{‡} Sales+streaming figures based on certification alone.

== Release history ==
Region	Date	Format(s)	Label(s)	Ref.
United Kingdom	29 July 1996	CD; cassette	Nude	
Japan	31 July 1996	CD	Nude	
