= New Generation =

1995 single by Suede

Single by Suede

from the album Dog Man Star
- B-side: "Together"; "Bentswood Boys"
- Released: 30 January 1995
- Studio: Master Rock (London, England)
- Genre: Britpop
- Length: 4:37
- Label: Nude
- Songwriters: Brett Anderson; Bernard Butler
- Producer: Ed Buller

Suede singles chronology
| "The Wild Ones" (1994) | "New Generation" (1995) | "Trash" (1996) |

"New Generation" is the third and final single from English rock band Suede's second album, Dog Man Star (1994). The song was released on 30 January 1995 through Nude Records and was the first single to feature music by new guitarist Richard Oakes. Though the title track is written by Anderson and departed guitarist Bernard Butler, Oakes contributes to "Together" and "Bentswood Boys". The single reached No. 21 on the UK Singles Chart. and No.1 on the Indie Chart

== Critical reception ==
Music & Media wrote: "Brett Anderson, the Bowie of the new generation, excels with a glittering pop song. The voice is put nicely upfront in the production; horns are in the back under layers of guitar." Steve Smith of The Press and Journal rated the single four stars out of five, writing: "another one destined to be a hit for a group still in their early years. Brett Anderson is his usual self on vocals – brilliant." Emma Cochrane of Smash Hits also rated the single four out of five, and called it a "catchy '90s anthem" and a "masterpiece." Craig Fitzsimons of Hot Press concurred, writing: "Suede do have one thing in their favour – unerringly catchy, hook-filled songs you can actually hum along to."

Keith Cameron of NME said that "New Generation" is "the best song by several leagues on the indigestibly overcooked Dog Man Star." Though he considered "Together" to be "the pick of the pair." Melody Maker's Holly Hernandez made comparisons to Bowie, saying "'New Generation' seems hopelessly and shamelessly 'Ashes to Ashes' while "Together" is "so unbelievably steeped in Major Tom." On the latter she wrote: "Brett's familiar warble takes on a layer of kitsch, sixties space-age distortion; Richard's guitar quivers and flits around it, and the whole thing is pumped up by outrageous rocket-launching synth."

== Music video ==
The video for the title song was directed by Richard Heslop, and features the whole band playing in a crowded room surrounded by broken television sets and dilapidated furniture, while a group of children dance or sit around. "New Generation" was the only video from the "Dog Man Star" era where Richard Oakes 'mimes' Bernard Butler's guitar part. It is also notable for its sepia format.

== Track listings ==
All songs were written by Brett Anderson and Bernard Butler except where noted.

UK CD1 and 12-inch single

1. "New Generation"
2. "Together" (Anderson, Richard Oakes)
3. "Bentswood Boys" (Anderson, Oakes)

UK CD2

1. "New Generation"
2. "Animal Nitrate" (live)
3. "The Wild Ones" (live)
4. "Pantomime Horse" (live)

UK cassette single and European CD single

1. "New Generation" – 4:32
2. "Together" – 4:31

European maxi-CD single

1. "New Generation"
2. "Together" (Anderson, Oakes)
3. "Bentswood Boys" (Anderson, Oakes)
4. "Animal Nitrate" (live)

Japanese CD single

1. "New Generation"
2. "Together" (Anderson, Oakes)
3. "Bentswood Boys" (Anderson, Oakes)
4. "The Wild Ones" (live)
5. "Pantomime Horse" (live)
6. "Asda Town" (Anderson)

== Release history ==
| Region | Date | Format(s) | Label(s) | Ref. |
|---|---|---|---|---|
| United Kingdom | 30 January 1995 | 12-inch vinyl; CD; cassette | Nude | |
| Japan | 9 March 1995 | CD | Nude | |
