= Stay Together (Suede song) =

1994 single by Suede

Single by Suede
- B-side: "The Living Dead"; "My Dark Star"
- Released: 14 February 1994
- Length: 4:19 (edit); 8:29; 7:26 (remastered long version)
- Label: Nude
- Songwriters: Brett Anderson; Bernard Butler
- Producer: Ed Buller

Suede singles chronology
"So Young" (1993)	"Stay Together" (1994)	"We Are the Pigs" (1994)

"Stay Together" is a non-album single by English band Suede, released on 14 February 1994, through Nude Records. It is tied with "Trash" as the highest-charting single the band has released, reaching No. 3 on the UK Singles Chart. The song also charted in Ireland, peaking at No. 18.

The single was released in the United States on 26 April as a six-song extended play (EP) and was the first release by the band as the London Suede. The State-side name change was the result of a successful lawsuit brought by Suzanne deBronkart, who had already been performing and recording in the US under the name Suede. The title track and the popular B-side, "My Dark Star", were ranked Suede's third and fourth-best songs by The Guardian in 2014.

== Background ==
Following the death of Bernard Butler's father, relations within Suede started to deteriorate. Butler kept to himself on the following tour of the US, while the other band members indulged in some of the worst excesses of their career. Butler travelled to concerts by himself or on The Cranberries tour bus, rather than travel with his bandmates. This influence became prevalent as Butler later stated, "Whatever I did on Stay Together was the A to Z of the emotions I was experiencing... defiance, loss, a final sigh." What was intended as a couple of days' recording stretched out to two weeks. It was later revealed that the song had almost 50 tracks of recorded material on it. Two versions of the song were released, the full length 8:35 version and a shorter 4:21 radio edit.

According to an entry in Simon Gilbert's diary in the biography Love and Poison, Butler objected to the lyrics in "Stay Together". The entry read: "Lyrics not to be printed on cover of single in case his mother reads it. '16 tears', obviously paedophilic!." The lyrics for "The Living Dead" were also criticised by Butler. At the time he said: "I've written this really beautiful piece of music and it's a squalid song about junkies."

== Release and promotion ==
Suede first premiered the song at a four-city French tour in late 1993. There were many press interviews at the time, with Brett Anderson appearing on the front cover of Vox and Sky magazines. While in Scotland, The List and The Scotsman wrote lengthy features and interviews with the band to promote the band's Edinburgh gig at the Queen's Hall. Suede secured two performances on Top of the Pops. To promote the single the band embarked on a three-date mini-tour of Worthing, Blackpool and Edinburgh.

"Stay Together" was released in the UK on 14 February 1994. The single was available in four formats: 7-inch vinyl and cassette, with the short version of "Stay Together" and B-side "The Living Dead"; 12-inch single with the full version of "Stay Together" and both B-sides; and CD single featuring both versions and both B-sides. The 12-inch single was issued in a limited edition (10,000) gatefold sleeve featuring a large band photo inside. The April issue of Select gave away a free cassette which included a piano version of "The Living Dead", recorded at Butler's flat on a 4-track. The single was released on Columbia Records ten weeks later in the US as a six-song EP 26 April 1994. The EP includes the B-sides "Dolly" and "High Rising", released as part of previous UK single "So Young".

The single charted at No. 3 on the UK Singles Chart. This was the band's highest-charting single at the time, which was later matched by 1996 single "Trash". Although Anderson is very keen to downplay the success of the single, and considers the song as a rare moment in the band's career where "hype dictated its success." The single did not chart in the US, although it is considered to be the closest the band came to having a hit-single there.

The promotional video for the song was filmed at Riverside Studios in London and directed by Jon Klein. In a commentary for the music video, Anderson walks out and returns after the video is over complaining about the video being filled with meaningless symbolism. The band felt that scenes of Butler hanging upside down and Anderson gagged are particularly misplaced considering the song's tone. During the video there are short clips of two jumpers about to fall from the roof of a tall building. There are also images of the Empire State Building and the World Trade Center in New York.

== Reception and legacy ==
The single received largely positive response upon release. NME and Melody Maker awarded it Single of the Week. John Harris of the former called the song a "four-act, eight-minute, fantastically ostentatious song. [...] Luxuriating in the ambitious, dramatic, exhausting spell of this one makes everything else sound like so much ephemera." The latter's Caitlin Moran called it "wild and elegant, soft then strong, and very, very long [...] It has the scope of 'High Rising' with the pop attack of 'So Young'." Tom Doyle awarded the song "Best New Single" in the 16 February issue of Smash Hits, calling it "a rock ballad of epic proportions concerning itself with the wonders of love in the grim modern world of skyscrapers and motorway paths." He called it their "best single yet" and predicted it would be the band's first No. 1 single.

Martin Aston of Music Week also rated its commercial prospects, writing: "An eight-minute magnum opus, Stay Together is a medium-tempo swaggerer that builds to a frenetic climax, with even a Brett Andersen 'rap' in the middle: a perfect, alternative anthem for disaffected Valentine's Day lovers. A strong candidate for their first number one hit." Writing for The Guardian, Caroline Sullivan spoke favourably of Suede's new musical direction, saying that "Suede prematurely reach the eight-minute song stage of their career. But what could have been a pretentious misjudgement turns out to be one of their brightest moves." Writing for The Daily Telegraph, Tony Parsons said that the single "reveals the band growing into the singular talent they always threatened to become. All comparisons with Morrissey and Bowie, Suede's guardian angels, are now redundant." On "The Living Dead", he called it a "beautiful, badly bruised song about loving a heroin addict [...] It's not much fun but it's unforgettable."

In 2012, "Stay Together" was placed at No. 3 on NME's 100 Best Tracks of the Nineties. In 2015 NME also included the single in their list of 50 must-have EPs, where "Stay Together" was ranked at No. 25. In the decade after its release, the band largely disowned the song. Anderson considers the single and accompanying video the worst the band has released, stating, "I don't think the fuss about Stay Together was justified, I think that was just hype. [...] I just find it a bit bombastic. I don't think the lyrics are that good either. It's okay." However publicist Jane Savidge suggests that Anderson "can't believe he wrote it about that girl, Anick" (Brett's girlfriend at the time), which is why he has no feelings for it. However, the song has since been played live on occasion in more recent years. In September 1994, just as fellow Britpop band Oasis were gaining popularity, their lead guitarist Noel Gallagher made a comment on the song's lyrics, saying: "There's not enough humour in music. Look at Suede with all this 'together in the nuclear sky' bollocks. I'm sorry, but the Cold War is over, Brett. Let's talk about beer and fags and lasagne instead. Even Bowie had a sense of humour. He wrote the fuckin' Laughing Gnome, didn't he?"

== Live performances ==
This was the last song ever played at a live gig with Butler, at the Queen's Hall in Edinburgh, on 12 February 1994, although he and Anderson performed the B-sides, "The Living Dead" and "My Dark Star" on MTV's Most Wanted the following month. After its release, "Stay Together" was never performed live and has only in recent years been performed on special occasions. The band would omit it from their set list for almost ten years when they finally played it at the five-night ICA residency in September 2003. Playing it during the encore on the final night, the band played the truncated 7-inch edit format. It next featured at the three-night Brixton Academy "Classic Albums" residency in May 2011 where they performed the song on the second night. Suede played the full eight-minute version of "Stay Together" as the final encore of their Teenage Cancer Trust gig at the Royal Albert Hall, Sunday 30 March 2014, backed by a string and brass ensemble.

== Track listings ==
All songs were written by Brett Anderson and Bernard Butler.

- Standard CD single; Australian cassette EP
1. "Stay Together" (edit)
2. "The Living Dead"
3. "My Dark Star"
4. "Stay Together"
- UK 7-inch and cassette single; European CD single
1. "Stay Together" (edit) – 4:19
2. "The Living Dead" – 2:49
- UK 12-inch single

A1. "Stay Together"
B1. "The Living Dead"
B2. "My Dark Star"

- US CD and cassette EP
1. "Stay Together" (edit)
2. "The Living Dead"
3. "My Dark Star"
4. "Dolly"
5. "High Rising"
6. "Stay Together"

== Charts ==
=== Weekly charts ===
Weekly chart performance for "Stay Together"
Chart (1994)	Peak position
Australia (ARIA)	104
Europe (Eurochart Hot 100)	11
Ireland (IRMA)	18
Israel (IBA)	5
New Zealand (Recorded Music NZ)	47
Scottish Singles Sales (Official Charts)	11
Sweden (Sverigetopplistan)	10
UK Singles (Official Charts)	3
UK Airplay (Music Week)	18
UK Indie (Music Week)	1

=== Year-end charts ===
Year-end chart performance for "Stay Together"
Chart (1994)	Position
Sweden (Topplistan)	99
UK Singles (OCC)	115

== Release history ==
Release dates and formats for "Stay Together"
Region	Date	Format(s)	Label(s)	Ref.
United Kingdom	14 February 1994	7-inch vinyl; 12-inch vinyl; CD; cassette	Nude	
Japan	21 March 1994	CD	Nude	
Australia	28 March 1994	CD; cassette	Nude	
United States	26 April 1994	CD; cassette	Nude; Columbia	
