= Beautiful Ones =

1996 single by Suede

Single by Suede

from the album Coming Up
- B-side: "Young Men"; "Sound of the Streets"; "Money"; "Sam"; "By the Sea" (demo)
- Released: 14 October 1996
- Genre: Britpop
- Length: 3:50
- Label: Nude
- Songwriters: Brett Anderson; Richard Oakes
- Producer: Ed Buller

Suede singles chronology
"Trash" (1996)	"Beautiful Ones" (1996)	"Saturday Night" (1997)

"Beautiful Ones" is a song by English rock band Suede, released as the second single from their third album, Coming Up (1996), on 14 October 1996 through Nude Records. The song became a top-10 hit in the United Kingdom, peaking at number eight, and reached number one in Iceland for two weeks.

== Background ==
Featuring one of new guitarist Richard Oakes' first guitar riffs, "Beautiful Ones" became one of Suede's more popular singles. The song was originally titled "Dead Leg" after bassist Mat Osman jokingly threatened to give Oakes a dead leg if he was unable to write a top ten single. The song charted at number eight on the UK Singles Chart in October 1996, in an era when the top 10 consisted of an eclectic mix of pop, indie and dance music.

== Reception and legacy ==
Larry Flick from Billboard magazine wrote, "Like a fast-mangled Oasis song, The London Suede succeeded in making sounds of pop/rock that are definitely unique. The painfully true lyrics and vibrant sounds have already proved to be a hit in the U.K." Kevin Courtney from The Irish Times commented, "The Suede resurrection continues apace with this second single from the band's brilliant Coming Up album [...] Richard Oakes's crispy guitar intro sets the sordid scene, and Brett takes up the trashy torch with bum slapping gusto. As immediate and invigorating as, well, a good sniff of premium unleaded."

Music writer James Masterton said in his weekly UK chart commentary, that the band’s follow up to "Trash" "hits similar heights with a rather fine catchy melody that is by no means instant but gradually works its way into your consciousness with repeated listens." A reviewer from Music Week gave it four out of five, adding that "the familiar strains of Brett Anderson ride over this strong single". Alex Needham of Smash Hits was mixed, giving the song a rating of two out of five. He called it: "A jovial, if hardly life-changing, bit of fluff from the nation's favourite pop spooks [...] It gains extra points for the line 'shaking their bits to the hits', but ultimately falls rather flat. The terrible truth is that Suede used to be brilliant until their old guitarist/tunesmith Bernard Butler left, and now they're just pleasantly average."

In 2014, Paste listed the song at number 34 in its list of "The 50 Best Britpop Songs". Michael Danaher wrote: "The song is both simple and sophisticated, and it's a true Britpop gem that deserves much attention." In a Clash retrospective feature on Coming Up, Ricky Jones called the single "a jangly pop masterpiece with one of the most melancholic sing-a-long choruses Britpop would ever produce."

== Music video ==
The music video for the song was directed by Pedro Romhanyi, who had previously made the video for the band's third single, "Animal Nitrate" in early 1993. The video features the band shot in black and white performing the song, intercut with quick edits of conceptual segments illustrating the song's lyrics in a literal fashion.

== Track listings ==
All songs were written by Brett Anderson and Richard Oakes except where noted.

- UK CD1
1. "Beautiful Ones"
2. "Young Men"
3. "Sound of the Streets" (Anderson)
- UK CD2
1. "Beautiful Ones"
2. "Money"
3. "Sam" (Anderson)
- UK cassette single
1. "Beautiful Ones"
2. "By the Sea" (original demo) (Anderson)
- European CD single
1. "Beautiful Ones"
2. "Young Men"
- Japanese CD single
1. "Beautiful Ones"
2. "Sound of the Streets" (Anderson)
3. "Money"
4. "Sam" (Anderson)

== Charts ==
=== Weekly charts ===
Chart (1996)	Peak position
Europe (Eurochart Hot 100)	56
Finland (Suomen virallinen lista)	6
Iceland (Íslenski Listinn Topp 40)	1
Israel (IBA)	11
Scottish Singles Sales (Official Charts)	10
Sweden (Sverigetopplistan)	11
UK Singles (Official Charts)	8
UK Indie (Music Week)	1

=== Year-end charts ===
Chart (1996)	Position
Iceland (Íslenski Listinn Topp 40)	57

== Certifications ==
Region	Certification	Certified units/sales
United Kingdom (BPI)	Gold	400,000^{‡}
^{‡} Sales+streaming figures based on certification alone.

== Release history ==
Region	Date	Format(s)	Label(s)	Ref.
United Kingdom	14 October 1996	CD1; cassette	Nude	
United Kingdom	21 October 1996	CD2	Nude	
Japan	20 November 1996	CD	Nude	
United States	21 July 1997	Modern rock radio	Nude; Columbia	
