= Simon Gilbert (musician) =

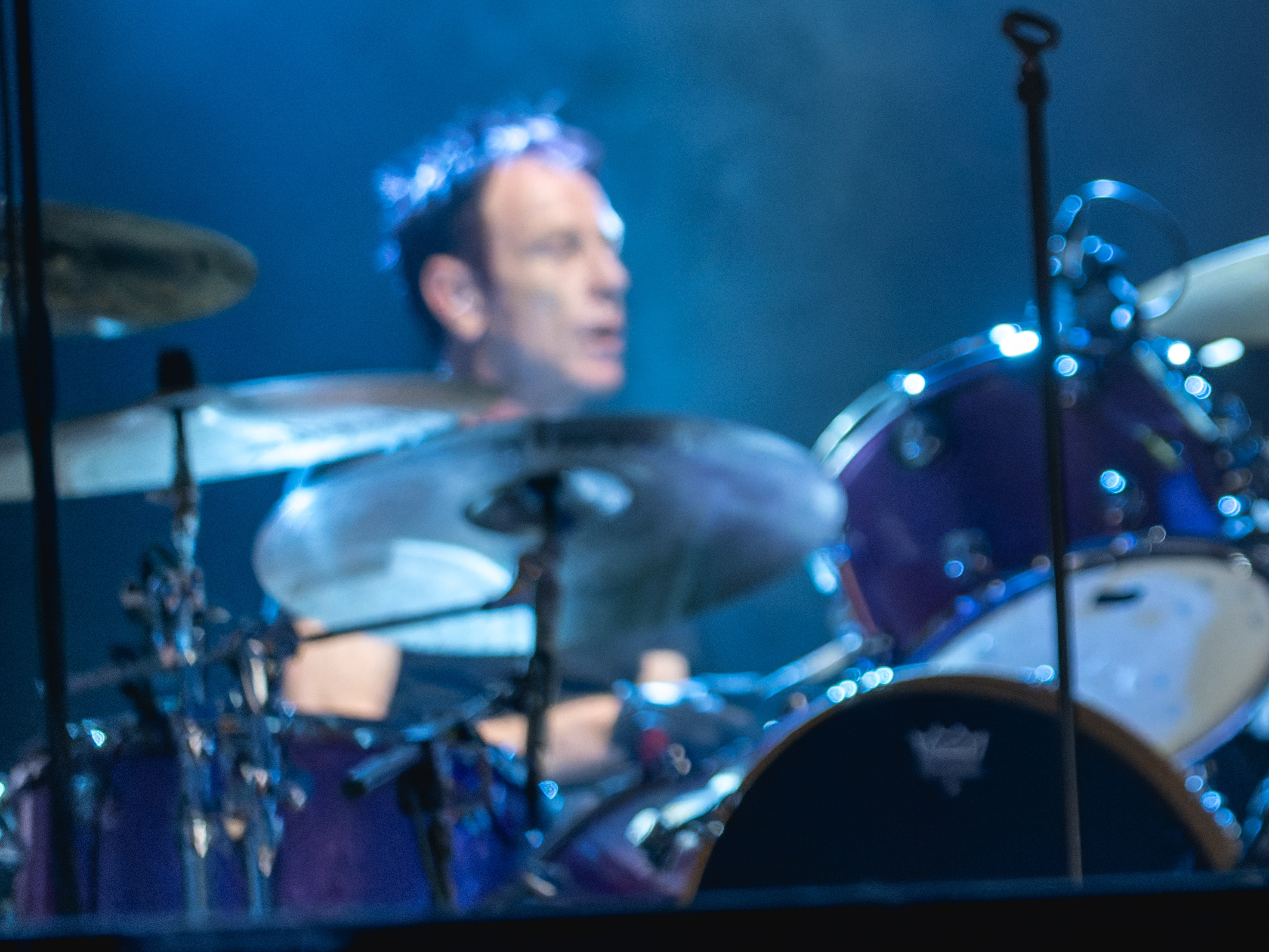
- Gilbert with Suede in 2024

Background information
- Born: 23 May 1965 (age 61)
- Genres: Britpop; alternative rock; indie rock; glam rock; art rock
- Instruments: Drums; percussion
- Years active: 1989–present
- Label: Drowned in Sound

Simon Gilbert (born 23 May 1965) is an English drummer and member of the English band Suede, one of the 'Big Four' Britpop bands of the 1990s with Oasis, Blur and Pulp. Gilbert is the third-longest-serving member of Suede, and, with founders Brett Anderson and Mat Osman, appears on every Suede album.

== Biography ==
Gilbert was initially drummer for English punk band Dead to the World. By June 1990 he was working at the University of London Union (ULU) alongside Ricky Gervais, who was also managing the then unknown and unsigned Suede. After Gervais played him a demo, Gilbert asked to audition as the band were relying on a drum machine at the time. After seeing the group perform at an NME show in January 1992, Saul Galpern approached the group with a view to signing to his independent record label Nude Records. In 1994, following the departure of Suede's guitarist Bernard Butler, Gilbert heard singer Brett Anderson playing through audition tapes and mistakenly believed one to be an early Suede demo. It turned out to be the work of 17-year-old Richard Oakes, who was subsequently hired as Butler's replacement. In January 1996 the band was joined by new member Neil Codling, a cousin of Gilbert who played keyboards and second guitar until early 2001.

Suede's last concert before their hiatus took place at the London Astoria on 13 December 2003 and was a two-and-a-half-hour marathon show, split into two parts plus encore, after which Gilbert became the drummer for a Bangkok band named Futon, with Into a Circle's Paul Hampshire.

Following persistent rumours, Saul Galpern officially announced on 15 January 2010 Suede would be playing together again at the Royal Albert Hall in London as part of the Teenage Cancer Trust shows on 24 March of that year. Planned as a 'one off', the reception to the band's reformation prompted several tours in Europe and Asia as well as five more albums.

Gilbert had collected a considerable amount of Suede footage spanning the band's career, much of which featured in a major definitive feature-documentary Suede: The Insatiable Ones. The film was directed by the acclaimed Mike Christie, whose film-making career began while working with Suede during the band's 1993 collaboration with Derek Jarman.

Aside from founders Brett Anderson and Mat Osman, Gilbert is the longest tenured member of Suede and has appeared on all the band's studio albums.

== Personal life ==
Simon Gilbert is gay; in a 1994 interview with Attitude where Brett Anderson described himself as "a bisexual man who's never had a homosexual experience", Gilbert replied with "I've called myself a bisexual person who's never had a heterosexual experience".

== Discography ==
=== With Suede ===
- Suede (1993)
- Dog Man Star (1994)
- Coming Up (1996)
- Head Music (1999)
- A New Morning (2002)
- Bloodsports (2013)
- Night Thoughts (2016)
- The Blue Hour (2018)
- Autofiction (2022)
- Antidepressants (2025)
