= Coming Up (album) =

Studio album by Suede
- Released: 2 September 1996
- Recorded: December 1995 – June 1996
- Genres: Britpop; glam rock; alternative rock
- Length: 42:27
- Label: Nude
- Producer: Ed Buller

Suede chronology
Dog Man Star (1994)	Coming Up (1996)	Sci-Fi Lullabies (1997)

Singles from Coming Up
- 1. "Trash" Released: 29 July 1996; 2. "Beautiful Ones" Released: 14 October 1996; 3. "Saturday Night" Released: 13 January 1997; 4. "Lazy" Released: 7 April 1997; 5. "Filmstar" Released: 11 August 1997

Coming Up is the third album by English alternative rock band Suede, released on 2 September 1996 through Nude Records. It was the band's first album since the departure of guitarist Bernard Butler, who was replaced by Richard Oakes. Also added to the band was keyboardist (and Simon Gilbert's cousin) Neil Codling. The album was nominated for the 1997 Mercury Prize. A commercial and critical success, Coming Up was the second by the band to reach no. 1 on the UK Albums Chart, producing five top ten singles and receiving a favourable reception at home and in the US. Coming Up was the album that introduced Suede to a worldwide audience, in places such as Europe, Canada and Asia.

== Background ==
After the departure of guitarist Bernard Butler and the lack of commercial success with Dog Man Star and its singles, Suede were being somewhat dismissed by the British music press with Oasis, Blur and Pulp taking the limelight. Determined to bring Suede back into the mainstream, frontman Brett Anderson decided that the sound of the new album would be the complete opposite of Dog Man Star. "I think the next album will be quite simple, actually. I'd really like to write a straightforward pop album. Just ten hits." The guitarist to replace Butler was the 17-year-old Richard Oakes, who beat 500 other applicants for the role. Instead of applying for the job like everyone else, Oakes was auditioned on the strength of an impromptu demo tape he sent to the Suede fan club. Despite Oakes' smooth integration into his new role and the band's rejuvenated spirit, Anderson was tired of touring and was keen to get back in the studio with his new songwriting partner. He recalled: "it was becoming really not much fun touring an album that wasn't made by the band." At the time Suede were fatigued with being on tour, which was reflected in the B-side, "Have You Ever Been This Low".

== Recording ==
After some hesitation over who was going to produce the album, the band decided to continue with long-time producer Ed Buller due to their strong working relationship over the years. Other candidates the band considered were Flood and Brian Eno, however they could not fit the band into their schedules. Buller had in fact welcomed a parting of the ways due to the fractious relationship between the band members during the recording of the last album. However, in friendly discussions with Anderson, Buller found that his ideas about a possible new Suede direction tallied almost exactly with the band's own: to write less complex, more immediate songs; to use heavier drum sounds, play fewer guitar solos and only employ string sections on a couple of songs such as "She" and "The Chemistry Between Us." The album was recorded between December 1995 and June 1996 at various locations. To prepare for its recording, the band had immersed themselves in T. Rex's 1972 album The Slider and its successor, Tanx; as Buller stated that his aspiration was to make "The Slider for the Nineties." T. Rex became the blueprint of the recording process, as the band spent a month at The Town House just working on drums.

Buller explained how the recording process worked: "Basically, what we did, is that every track started with acoustic guitar, bongos, tambourine and Brett [Anderson], so it all started life pretty much the same way that Marc Bolan recorded all of his stuff originally." Bass player Mat Osman recalls how Buller was keen on making the album simple. "He was really keen on using all those devices: the big repeated end, the handclaps, the straightforward chorus, make it big and obvious." In an interview on the eve of the album's release, Anderson stated: "I wanted it to be a complete turnover from the last album, which was very dark and dank ... I wanted it to be communicative and understandable." Two songs which made it onto Coming Up had already been written in the early days of Suede. "Lazy" and "By the Sea" were two of Anderson's own compositions. "By the Sea" was actually written when Suede were recording their first album, which is why the song's opening line is similar to "So Young". Unlike the tense and chaotic recording of Dog Man Star, which according to Anderson was mostly written "by post", in a shift-like format, the new material was far more celebratory in both its development and execution.

As opposed to the previous album which followed a stringent pattern of Butler composing music for Anderson's lyrics, Coming Up was a more collaborative project. Anderson stated: "Coming Up was more of a meritocracy – if something was good enough, it didn't matter what the source was." Songs such as "By the Sea" and "She" required the use of keyboards. Faced with the problem as to how to play them live, Suede recruited Simon Gilbert's cousin Neil Codling, who made his debut at a fan-club gig in January 1996. Buller has stated that the reason why the album has a much better sound than the previous albums is that he had minimal involvement in the mixing process, mixing only two songs. Buller credits much of the album's success to Dave Bascombe, who mixed the majority of the songs. According to Buller, having an outside observer mix the record with "fresh ears" enhances the overall production quality. Bascombe's input on "Trash" was crucial, as it was his idea to speed up the vocals. One of Suede's popular B-sides "Young Men" was left off the album, as Buller felt it was "too dark" and not as "poppy [and] in your face" as other songs on the record.

== Music ==
"It was a chance to do everything Dog Man Star didn't and make a bright, communicative album. It's like a pendulum: you go one way and then the other. I really wanted to make a straight-up pop record. We were listening to a lot of '60s pop at the time and were very much inspired by the classic three-and-a-half-minute singles."

— Brett Anderson reflecting on Coming Up.

The musical sound of Coming Up is more accessible than previous album Dog Man Star. Its singles were much more successful than those of their second LP, while the lyrical content concerns the band's disaffection at the mid-90s hedonistic, celebrity-obsessed culture; "Beautiful Ones" and "She" are caricatures of British yuppies, celebrities and heroin-chic models. "Beautiful Ones" was originally titled "Dead Leg" after Osman threatened to give Oakes a dead leg if he was unable to write a top ten single. According to Anderson, "The Chemistry Between Us" is about "the emptiness of it all", when it comes to taking drugs with strangers who have no common ground other than being high on drugs. The main refrain of the song is "Class A, Class B, is that the only chemistry between us."

== Critical reception ==
Professional ratings
Review scores
Source	Rating
AllMusic	4/5 stars
Entertainment Weekly	B+
The Guardian	4/5 stars
NME	8/10
The Philadelphia Inquirer	3/4 stars
Pitchfork	7.9/10
Q	4/5 stars
Rolling Stone	3/5 stars
Rolling Stone Album Guide	3.5/5 stars
Select	4/5
Spin	8/10

Reviews were generally positive and seemed to respect Suede's new poppy and direct sound. James Delingpole of The Daily Telegraph wrote: "Coming Up is their defiant reminder of what made Suede so special [...] If Dog Man Star was Diamond Dogs, then this is Suede's Ziggy Stardust – extravagant, steeped in glam and unashamedly poppy." Roy Wilkinson of Select called it: "a wondrous pop album, simultaneously immediate and full of scope, a lovely, charming mix of absolute beauty and the thrillingly awkward." Caroline Sullivan of The Guardian felt that even despite the album's simplistic composition of "vibrant three-minute howla-longs", it still manages to avoid being too mainstream and incomparable to rivals Oasis and Blur. Andy Gill of The Independent, however was a harsh critic of the album. In contrast to the band's earlier work, he wrote: "two albums and one guitarist later, they sound utterly mined out." He added: "in many ways, it's a step back from Dog Man Star – and their manner grows increasingly obnoxious."

Despite its success in the UK and Europe, Coming Up did not win an audience in America, partially because of its later release in April 1997 and partially because Suede only supported it with a three-city tour. Critical reception, however was generally positive stateside. Marc Savlov of The Austin Chronicle wrote: "Oakes more than fills the boots of his predecessor, and the new CD is a pure pop pleasure, thick and sinewy and terribly, cooly [sic] British." Keith Phipps of The A.V. Club had similar views, saying: "The London Suede should, by all laws of musical logic, have disappeared by now. However, after surviving a name change, the replacement of co-songwriter/guitarist Bernard Butler with an obscure 17-year old, and more than a few changes in musical fashion, the band has returned with a third album that's more consistent and accessible than anything it's produced before." James Hunter of Spin said that "the band pushes its case by ascending to heights of absolutely lucid songcraft that, in this often fuzzy era, feels exhilarating." Rolling Stone critic Elysa Gardner noted their "concise melodies and taut, brashly energetic arrangements".

Other critics were favourable, however with the caveat of highlighting the album's simplicity. In a retrospective review, Stephen Thomas Erlewine of AllMusic wrote: "The most striking thing about Coming Up is the simplicity [...] As a statement of purpose, Coming Up is unimpeachable. Though it doesn't break any new ground for the band — unless you count the new-found sense of optimism." With similar views, Kevin Courtney of The Irish Times wrote: "Sometimes the songs seem a little too simple and throwaway, but Anderson tosses them aside with such aplomb, you can't wait to pick up after him."

Suede embarked on a short tour of the US and Canada in May 1997 to support the album, but fell upon bad fortune when their equipment got stolen after playing a sold-out show in Boston, Massachusetts on 17 May.

== Commercial performance ==
Coming Up was a commercial success. It spawned five top 10 singles in the UK and charted at number one on the UK Albums Chart. The album was certified as platinum by the BPI in January 1997. It had sold 425,000 copies in the UK as of July 1997. Excluding the US, where Coming Up had a later release date, year-end worldwide sales were roughly 600,000, with the top markets being the UK, Scandinavia and Japan. Worldwide sales reached 1.5 million by 1998. The proportion of worldwide sales in the US, however was much lower than the sales of the first album. According to Nielsen SoundScan, Coming Up has sold about 40,000 copies in the US as of September 2008. The record sold well in Scandinavia, with "Trash" becoming the band's first overseas number one single, topping the charts in Finland. The album charted at number one in both Sweden and Denmark, and number three in Norway. The album was also certified as Gold in Norway and Platinum in Sweden. Anderson saw the funny side of their newfound popularity, saying: "They went mad for it in Scandinavia, maybe because they're all depressed sex maniacs or something."

== Legacy ==
In December 1996, The Face, Melody Maker, Q, Hot Press and Select listed Coming Up as one of the ten best albums of the year, while Mojo and NME ranked it 12th.

In 1997, the album was listed at number 83 in Virgin Megastores' "Chart of the Century" poll of the 100 greatest albums. The poll was compiled from votes cast by the UK public during August and September 1997. In 1998, Q readers voted Coming Up the 36th greatest album of all time. In the book, All Time Top 1000 Albums by Colin Larkin, Coming Up was ranked at number 195. In 1999, American music critic Ned Raggett, writing in Freaky Trigger, ranked Coming Up as the 42nd greatest album of the 1990s. The following year, Q ranked the album the 96th greatest British album ever. In 2014, The Village Voice ranked Coming Up at number 10 in its list of the 10 best Britpop albums.

To mark the album's 25th anniversary, the band played a UK tour in November 2021. Coming Up also featured in an episode of the Sky Arts documentary series Classic Albums on May 7, 2021.

== Track listing ==
All tracks are written by Brett Anderson and Richard Oakes, except where noted.

No.	Title	Writer(s)	Length
1.	"Trash"		4:06
2.	"Filmstar"		3:25
3.	"Lazy"	Anderson	3:19
4.	"By the Sea"	Anderson	4:15
5.	"She"		3:38
6.	"Beautiful Ones"		3:50
7.	"Starcrazy"	Anderson, Neil Codling	3:33
8.	"Picnic by the Motorway"		4:45
9.	"The Chemistry Between Us"	Anderson, Codling	7:04
10.	"Saturday Night"		4:32

Bonus track on the Japanese edition
No.	Title	Length
11.	"Young Men"	4:36

=== 2011 remastered and expanded version ===
Disc One: Demos
No.	Title	Length
11.	"She" (Greenhouse Demo)	2:49
12.	"Lazy" (Greenhouse Demo)	3:15
13.	"Dead Leg" (Beautiful Ones)	3:16
14.	"Filmstar" (Church Demo)	2:38
15.	"Pisspot" (Trash)	5:02
16.	"Ballad Idea" (Saturday Night Church Demo)	3:49
17.	"Tiswas" (Starcrazy)	3:20

B-sides
No.	Title	Writer(s)	Length
18.	"Asda Town"	Anderson	3:08
19.	"Together"		4:34
20.	"Bentswood Boys"		3:14

Disc Two: The B-Sides
No.	Title	Writer(s)	Length
1.	"Europe Is Our Playground" (original version)	Anderson, Mat Osman	4:39
2.	"Have You Ever Been This Low?"		3:56
3.	"Another No One"	Anderson	3:52
4.	"Every Monday Morning Comes"		4:29
5.	"Sound of the Streets"	Anderson	5:01
6.	"Young Men"		4:37
7.	"Sam"	Anderson	3:38
8.	"Money"		4:06
9.	"This Time"		5:47
10.	"W.S.D."	Anderson	4:40
11.	"Jumble Sale Mums"		4:17
12.	"These Are the Sad Songs"		6:22
13.	"Feel"	Anderson, Simon Gilbert, Osman, Oakes, Codling	5:05
14.	"Sadie"		5:26
15.	"Graffiti Women"	Anderson	4:51
16.	"Duchess"	Anderson, Codling	3:52

Extra track
No.	Title	Writer(s)	Length
17.	"Motown" (Previously unreleased rehearsal room recording)	Anderson, Codling	4:42

== Personnel ==
Suede

- Brett Anderson – vocals
- Richard Oakes – guitars
- Simon Gilbert – drums
- Mat Osman – bass guitar
- Neil Codling – keyboards

Production

- Ed Buller – production, engineering, mixing
- Gary Stout – engineering
- David Bascombe – mixing (except "Saturday Night")
- Craig Armstrong – string arrangement

Artwork

- Nick Knight – cover
- Peter Saville – cover
- Brett Anderson – cover
- Steve Seal – paintbox
- Lee, Leah and Paula – cover models
- Donald Christie – photography
- Howard Wakefield – design

== Charts and certifications ==
=== Weekly charts ===
Chart (1996)	Peak position
Australian Albums (ARIA)	35
Austrian Albums (Ö3 Austria)	39
Belgian Albums (Ultratop Flanders)	39
Belgian Albums (Ultratop Wallonia)	29
Danish Albums (Hitlisten)	1
Dutch Albums (Album Top 100)	65
Finnish Albums (Suomen virallinen lista)	4
French Albums (SNEP)	30
German Albums (Offizielle Top 100)	37
Japanese Albums (Oricon)	37
New Zealand Albums (RMNZ)	30
Norwegian Albums (VG-lista)	3
Swedish Albums (Sverigetopplistan)	1
UK Albums (Official Charts)	1
US Heatseekers Albums (Billboard)	17

=== Year-end charts ===
Chart (1996)	Position
Swedish Albums (Sverigetopplistan)	28
UK Albums (OCC)	53
Chart (1997)	Position
Swedish Albums Chart	75
UK Albums (OCC)	67

=== Certifications and sales ===
Region	Certification	Certified units/sales
Iceland	—	3,300
Norway (IFPI Norway)	Gold	25,000^{*}
Sweden (GLF)	Platinum	100,000^{^}
United Kingdom (BPI)	Platinum	300,000^{^}
^{*} Sales figures based on certification alone.^{^} Shipments figures based on certification alone.

== Bibliography ==
- Barnett, David. Love and Poison. Carlton Publishing Group, 2003. ISBN 0-233-00094-1
