= Neil Codling =

English musician

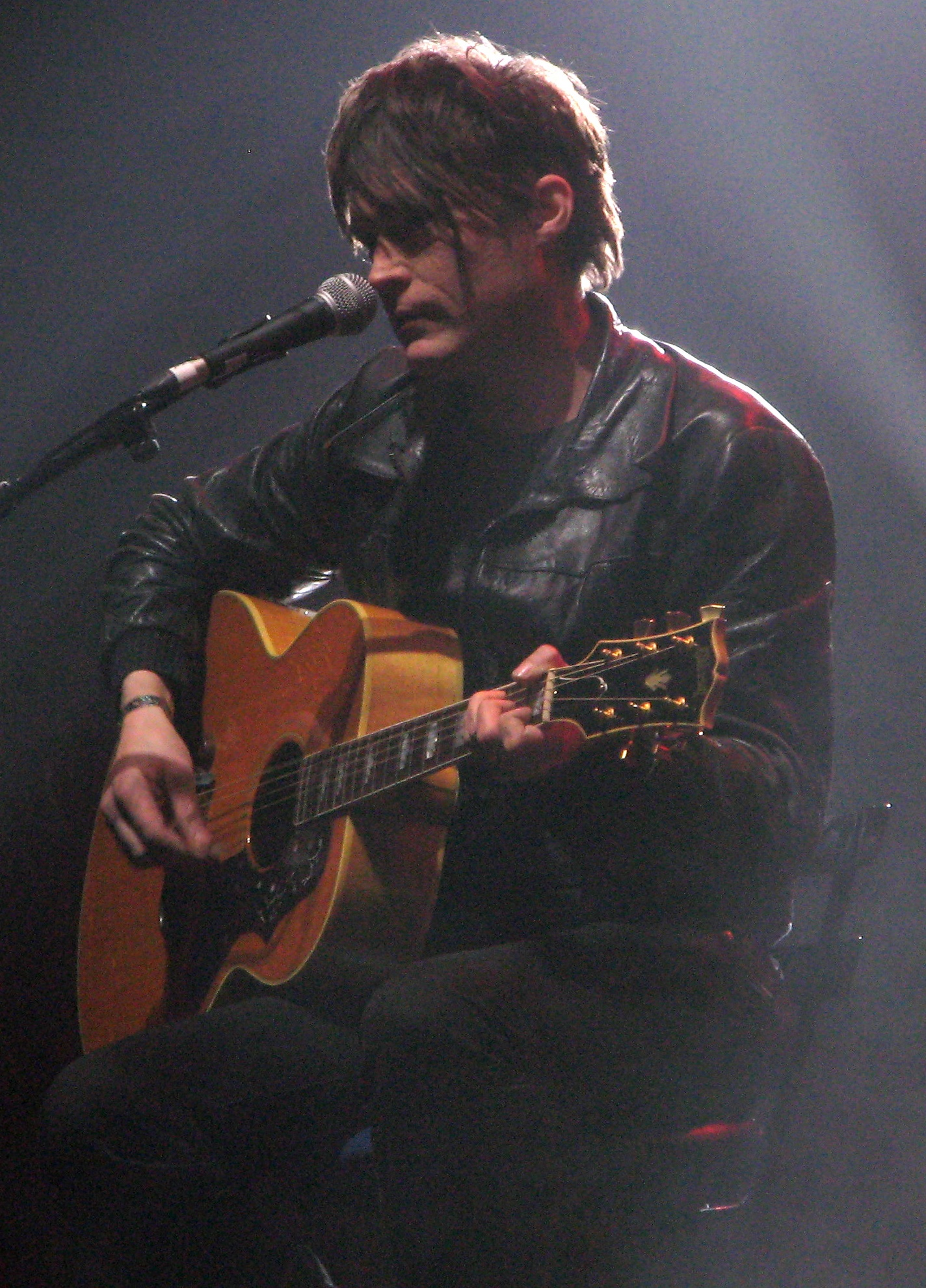
- Neil Codling in December 2010

Background information
- Born: Neil John Codling; 5 December 1973 (age 52)
- Origin: Tiddington, Warwickshire, England
- Genres: Britpop; alternative rock
- Occupation: Musician
- Instruments: Keyboards; vocals; guitar
- Years active: 1995–present

Neil John Codling (born 5 December 1973) is an English musician and songwriter, best known as the keyboardist, rhythm guitarist, and co-songwriter for the alternative rock band Suede.

== Early life ==
Neil Codling was raised in Stratford-upon-Avon Warwickshire, attended King Edward VI School, Stratford-upon-Avon and studied English and Drama at the University of Hull.

He and the drummer of Suede, Simon Gilbert, are cousins.

== Suede ==
In the autumn of 1995, Codling joined the band as a keyboardist and backing vocalist whilst recording their third album, Coming Up.

His first appearance for Suede took place in Hanover Grand, on a secret fanclub gig on 27 January 1996, while his first public performance with Suede was in September 1996.

For their 1999 album Head Music, his role became considerably larger within the band, co-writing many of the album's songs. Aside from singer Brett Anderson, Codling was the only member of Suede to receive sole writing credit on several of the group's songs, which included "Elephant Man", "Digging a Hole", "Waterloo" and "Weight of the World", and sang lead on the latter three songs, all B-sides. Codling also played some rhythm guitar during live shows while he was in the group. Together with Richard Oakes, Codling gave Suede's style a touch of pop and electricity, giving birth to two No. 1 albums in the UK: Coming Up and Head Music.

On 23 March 2001, it was announced that Codling had quit Suede, due to his chronic fatigue syndrome. In December 2004 he played a show featuring his musical project Barry O'Neil, which is a duo comprising him and Harriet Cawley.

Subsequently, Codling played keyboards on tour with the pop singer Natalie Imbruglia in 2005. In April 2007, it was announced that Codling would be playing keyboards for two Anderson solo concerts in Germany—the first time the pair would be re-united since he left Suede. In 2009, Codling joined Penguin Cafe and continues to play with the orchestra in the present day.

Codling joined his former bandmates for three UK Suede concerts in 2010, and the reunited band continued playing occasional gigs around the world throughout 2010 and 2011.

In 2013, Suede released Bloodsports, their first album in 10 years, and the first album in 14 years to featured Codling. Codling is credited with part-writing eight of its ten songs.

The Suede album Night Thoughts was released on 22 January 2016. Codling has eight writing credits of its twelve songs. He co-produced the album with Ed Buller.

A new Suede album The Blue Hour was released on 21 September 2018. Codling is co-credited with writing 9 songs in the album, as well as co-producing the album with Alan Moulder.

On 16 September 2022, Suede released Autofiction. Codling is credited with part-writing five of its eleven songs.
