= Ed Buller =

- Born: Edmund William Hector Buller
- Genres: Rock; Britpop
- Occupations: Music producer; musician
- Instrument: Keyboards
- Years active: 1977–present
- Website: edbuller.co.uk

Edmund Wilbur Hudson Buller is an English record producer and former musician. He has primarily worked with English bands including Suede, Pulp, the Raincoats and the Courteeners.

== Biography ==
Buller first became interested in music after his father, composer John Buller, took him to see Stravinsky's ballet, The Rite of Spring, at the age of 6.

As a teenager, after some early experience using a rarely-available synthesizer at Reading University while he was at Leighton Park School (he was able to operate it while the staff could not), he joined the Psychedelic Furs as a keyboard player and toured with them for several years. After leaving the band, he took up record production, moving his way up through London studios and eventually became the in-house engineer for Island Records. The first successful album that Buller produced was Suede's debut album in 1993 which peaked #1 on the UK Albums Chart as well as winning the Mercury Prize. During his career he participated in two other number one albums (Suede's Coming Up and White Lies's To Lose My Life...) and was nominated for a Brit Award for British Producer of the Year. In 1995, he worked with Flood, Gary Stout and Dave Bessell on Node; an analog-synth heavy project that produced a single album, Node (a follow-up was released in 2014: Node 2).

In 1998, Buller moved to California and studied composition and orchestration at the San Francisco Conservatory of Music. He has recently worked with British bands White Lies, the Courteeners, the Cheek and One Night Only, recording in Brussels, as well as Suede's comeback album Bloodsports in March 2013, and their seventh album Night Thoughts in January 2016.

== Selected production credits ==
- 2022: Suede - Autofiction (Producer)
- 2019: White Lies - Five (Producer & Engineer)
- 2016: Suede - Night Thoughts (Producer)
- 2013: White Lies - Big TV (Producer & Engineer)
- 2013: Suede - Bloodsports (Producer & Engineer)
- 2010: The Courteeners - Falcon (Producer)
- 2010: One Night Only - One Night Only (Producer & Engineer)
- 2009: White Lies - To Lose My Life... (Producer & Engineer)^{a}
- 2009: Blacklist - Midnight of the Century (Mixer & Keyboards)^{a}
- 2007: Martino Conspiracy - Hope in Isolation (Engineer)
- 2005: Alex Lloyd - Alex Lloyd (Producer, Engineer & Mixer)
- 2005: t.A.T.u. - Dangerous and Moving (Producer)
- 2003: Steve Burns - Songs for Dustmites (Producer & Engineer)
- 2001: Eskimo Joe - Girl (Producer & Engineer)
- 2001: Outerstar - Outerstar (Mixer & Engineer)
- 2001: Stabbing Westward - Stabbing Westward (Producer & Engineer)
- 2000: The Superjesus - Jet Age (Producer & Engineer)
- 2000: Tinfed - Tried + True (Producer & Engineer)
- 1999: Alex Lloyd - Black The Sun (Producer & Engineer)
- 1999: Ben Lee - Breathing Tornados (Producer & Engineer)
- 1999: Justin Clayton - Limb (Mixer)
- 1997: Closer - Don't Walk (Producer & Engineer)
- 1997: Gravity Kills - Manipulated (Mixer)
- 1996: Suede - Coming Up (Producer & Engineer)^{a}
- 1996: Raincoats - Looking in the Shadows (Producer & Engineer)
- 1994: Suede - Dog Man Star (Producer & Engineer)^{c}
- 1994: Pulp - His 'n' Hers (Producer & Mixer)
- 1993: Slowdive - Souvlaki (Mixer)
- 1993: Suede - Suede (Producer & Engineer)^{a}^{b}
- 1992: The Boo Radleys - Everything's Alright Forever (Producer & Engineer)
- 1991: The Primitives - Galore (Producer)
- 1990: Lush (band) - Sweetness and Light (EP) (Engineer)
- 1988: Jim Capaldi - Some Come Running (Engineer & Mixer)

== Notes ==
^a Peaked as number 1 on the UK Albums Chart.
^b Won a Mercury Prize award.
^c Nominated for a Brit Award for best producer.
