= Richard Oakes (guitarist) =

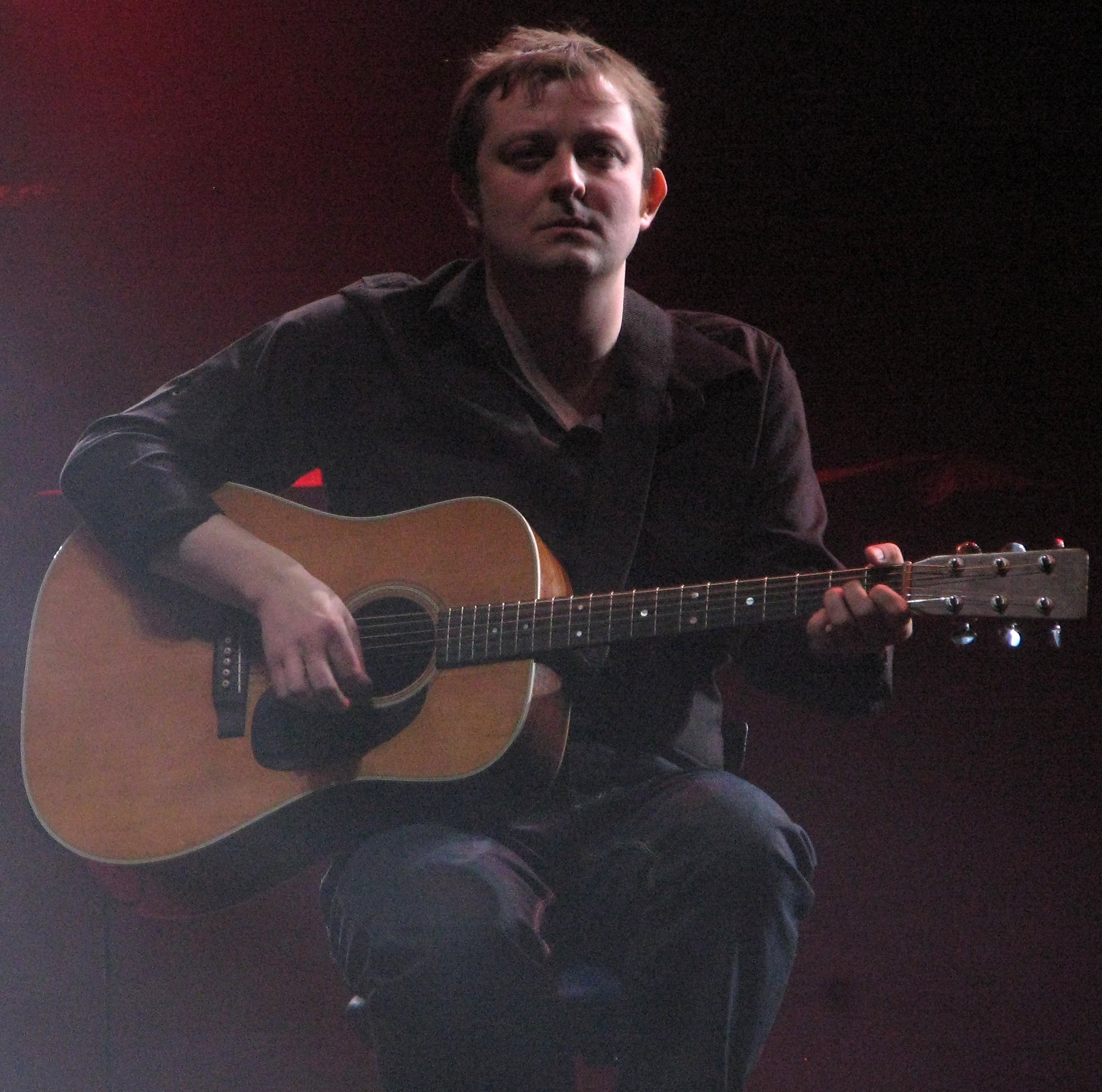
- Richard Oakes on stage with Suede London 2010

Background information
- Born: Richard John Oakes; 1 October 1976 (age 50); Perivale, London, England
- Origin: Poole, Dorset, England
- Genres: Alternative rock; Britpop
- Occupations: Musician; songwriter
- Instruments: Guitar; vocals; piano
- Years active: 1994–present

Richard John Oakes (born 1 October 1976) is an English musician and songwriter, best known as the guitarist, occasional pianist, backing vocalist and co-songwriter of the English band Suede.

== Early life ==
Richard Oakes was born in Perivale, West London, and grew up in the Parkstone area of Poole, Dorset in southwestern England. He first started playing when he came across a Spanish guitar that his sister owned. The album that initially influenced him to pursue a career in music was The Story of the Clash, Volume 1, which he heard when he was 12. Prior to joining Suede, Oakes played in a band called "TED" along with his friends Peter Field (vocals) and Colin Forbes (Rhythm guitar).

== Suede ==
The first gig Oakes attended was one of Suede's at the Poole Arts Centre in May 1993. Upon hearing that guitarist Bernard Butler had left the band and that the band were auditioning for a replacement, he recorded versions of Suede songs and some of his own material on a 4 track recorder, which he sent to the band's fanclub along with a note that read "Take me or leave me." When drummer Simon Gilbert heard Brett Anderson playing back the tape whilst going through audition tapes, he mistakenly believed it to be an early Suede demo. After the second audition Oakes was invited to join the band.

At the age of 17, and after beating approximately five hundred candidates, Oakes officially joined Suede on 17 September 1994 (2 weeks before his 18th birthday). Oakes first public appearance with the band was on Top of the Pops, while his first full live appearance was at a secret fan club gig at London's Raw Club on 10 October 1994. The first song he performed live, and the first video he appeared in, was "We are the Pigs".

His first co-writing credits were the B-sides of single "New Generation", "Together" and "Bentswood Boys". Oakes went on to co-write many songs with Anderson on subsequent albums and B-side material, several of which went on to become hit singles in the UK.

Oakes joined his former bandmates for three UK Suede concerts in 2010, followed by a concert at London's O2 Arena in December of that year, then festival appearances in Sweden, Hultsfredsfestivalen in July and Denmark and Norway in August. Suedes's reunion continued with their sixth album, Bloodsports, on which Oakes co-wrote all but two of the songs, released in March 2013.

Suede released their seventh album Night Thoughts on 22 January 2016 to widespread critical acclaim. Oakes co-wrote all but four of the songs. It was accompanied by a feature film, directed by Roger Sargent. During their 2016 tour the band performed the first half of their set from behind a screen onto which Sargent's film was projected.

== Artmagic ==
Artmagic is a duo formed by Oakes and producer/singer Sean McGhee in 2008. Their debut EP, I Keep on Walking, was released on 23 May 2011, followed by a single, "Forever in Negative" on 25 June 2012. Their debut album, Become The One You Love, was released on 2 July 2012. A further single, "Down in the River" followed on 21 October 2012.

A new song, "Sing For The Snowfall" was released on Christmas Day 2017. A single, "The Clean Room", was released on 27 April 2018. The duo's second album, The Songs of Other England, was released on 15 June 2018.

== Alison Moyet ==
Oakes played guitar on 6 songs on Alison Moyet's 2024 album Key and co-wrote the single "Such Small Ale". The album was released on 4 October 2024 and reached number eight on the UK album charts.

== Influences ==
Oakes's main influences are John McGeoch of Siouxsie and the Banshees, and Keith Levene.
