= Suede discography =

Discography of the English alternative rock band

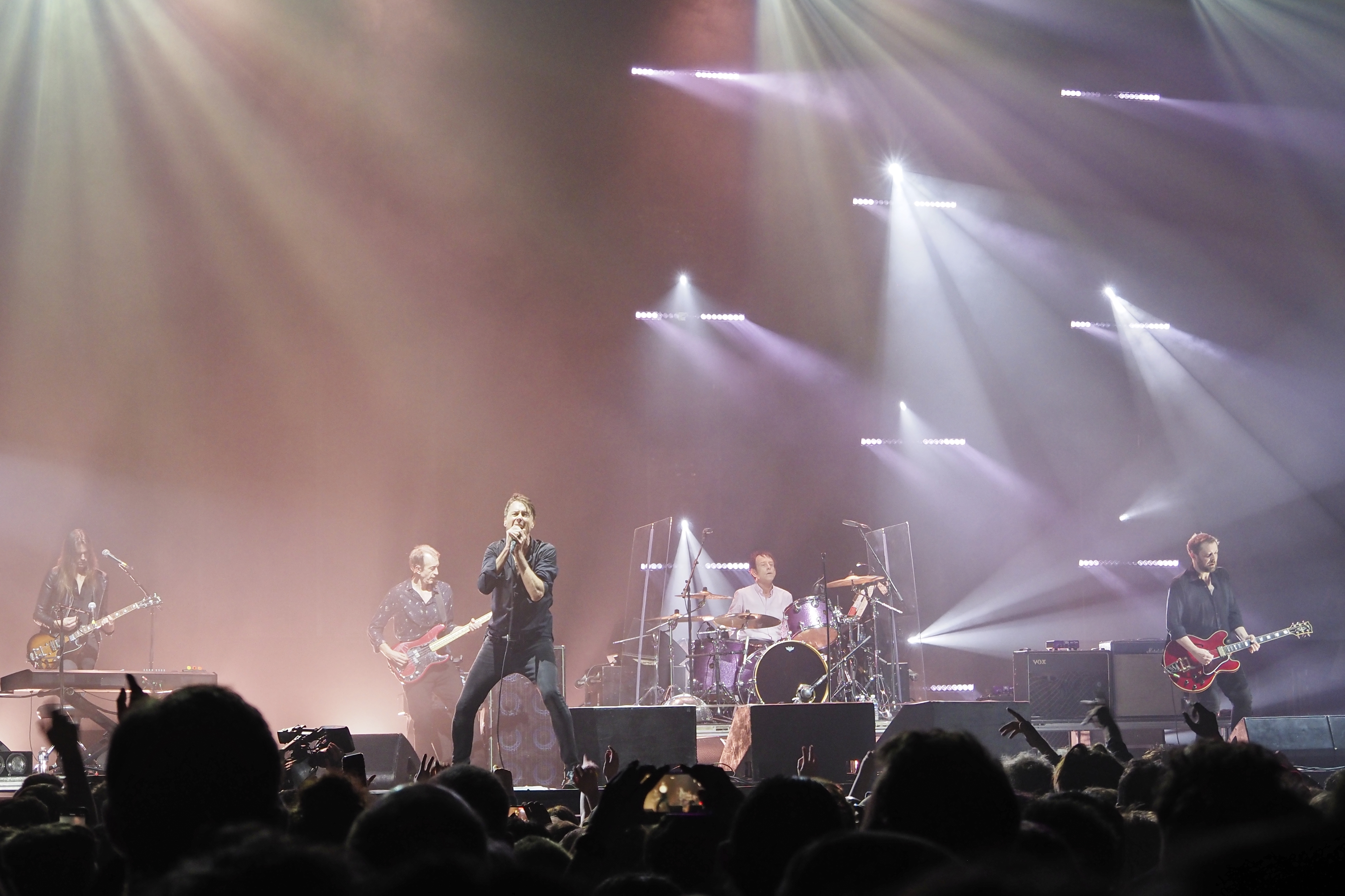
- Suede performing live at Ally Pally in 2021
- Studio albums: 10
- Compilation albums: 6
- Singles: 35
- Video albums: 5
- Music videos: 26

The discography of the English alternative rock band Suede consists of ten studio albums, four compilation albums, five video albums and over twenty singles. Suede were formed in 1989 by singer Brett Anderson, bassist Mat Osman and guitarist Justine Frischmann. Guitarist Bernard Butler later joined after the group responded to an ad in Melody Maker. The group played as a four-piece with a drum machine until drummer Simon Gilbert joined. Frischmann left before the group released any material.

Despite the media frenzy that surrounded the group, their 1992 debut single "The Drowners" only peaked at number 49 on the UK Singles Chart. It was not until the release of their third single, "Animal Nitrate", that Suede reached the top ten, with the song peaking at number seven following their performance of it at the 1993 BRIT Awards.

Suede became associated with the Britpop movement of the period and achieved commercial success in the United Kingdom, with three of the group's five studio albums charting at number one. Their popularity throughout the rest of the world varied, but they had several charting hits in Denmark, Finland, Norway and Sweden. Suede's commercial success in the United States was limited, and due to a lawsuit with an American singer with the same name, the group had to change its name for the American market to The London Suede. Despite the lack of commercial success in the US, the four studio albums released in America all charted on Billboard's Top Heatseekers chart, though the group never charted on the Billboard 200. Suede also had three minor hits in the US, with "Metal Mickey" peaking at number seven on the Modern Rock Tracks in 1993, "Everything Will Flow" charting at number 28 on the Hot Dance Music/Club Play chart in 1999 and "Hit Me" in 2013.

Butler left while the band were recording Dog Man Star and was soon replaced by Richard Oakes. Keyboardist Neil Codling joined the group for Dog Man Star's follow-up Coming Up. Following a commercial resurgence with Coming Up and 1999s Head Music, Codling left in 2001 due to complications with chronic fatigue syndrome and was replaced by former Strangelove keyboardist Alex Lee.

After a long and expensive recording span, A New Morning was released in 2002 and was a commercial and critical disappointment in the UK. The first single released from A New Morning, "Positivity", became the group's only single to chart in Canada, and peaked at number one in Denmark.

In November 2003, Suede released the compilation album Singles, which included all 19 of their previously released singles, plus two new songs, "Attitude" (itself released as a single along with the non-album "Golden Gun" to promote the album) and "Love the Way You Love Me". Following the release of Singles Suede announced they were disbanding at the end of 2003.

Reforming in 2010 to play a concert for the Teenage Cancer Trust Foundation, the band decided to start recording again. 2013 saw the release of Bloodsports. An even more successful album followed in 2016 with Night Thoughts.

== Albums ==
=== Studio albums ===
Title	Details	Peak chart positions										Sales	Certifications (sales thresholds)
Title	Details	UK	AUS	FIN	FRA	GER	JPN	NED	NOR	SWE	US Heat.	Sales	Certifications (sales thresholds)
Suede	Released: 29 March 1993; Label: Nude; Formats: CD, CS, DL, LP, MD	1	23	12	34	50	31	77	18	7	14	UK 301,000; US 105,000	BPI: Gold; GLF: Gold
Dog Man Star	Released: 10 October 1994; Label: Nude; Formats: CD, CS, DL, LP, MD	3	73	14	32	—	39	—	—	5	35	US 36,000	BPI: Gold
Coming Up	Released: 2 September 1996; Label: Nude; Formats: CD, CS, DL, LP, MD	1	35	4	30	37	27	65	3	1	17	UK 435,125; US 40,000	BPI: Platinum; GLF: Gold; IFPI NOR: Gold
Head Music	Released: 3 May 1999; Label: Nude; Formats: CD, CS, DL, LP, MD	1	26	3	39	26	29	56	1	1	25	US 26,000	BPI: Gold; GLF: Gold
A New Morning	Released: 30 September 2002; Label: Epic; Formats: CD, CS, DL, LP	24	57	9	68	74	59	81	6	19	—	UK: 40,000	
Bloodsports	Released: 18 March 2013; Label: Warner Music; Formats: CD, DL, LP	10 (Note: Also charted at No. 2 the UK Indie Chart.)	181	—	97	95	42	65	18	32	14		
Night Thoughts	Released: 22 January 2016; Label: Warner Music; Formats: CD, CD+DVD, DL, LP	6	134	—	64	31	34	23	25	37	10	UK: 29,117	
The Blue Hour	Released: 21 September 2018; Label: Warner Music; Formats: CD, CD+DVD, DL, LP	5	—	37	—	32	58	52	—	48	—	UK: 27,396	
Autofiction	Released: 16 September 2022; Label: BMG; Formats: CD, DL, LP	2	—	23	108	20	—	11	—	41	—	UK: 30,460	
Antidepressants	Released: 5 September 2025; Label: BMG; Formats: CD, CS, DL, LP	2	—	28	—	—	47	34	—	56	—	UK: 27,704	
"—" denotes a release that did not chart or was not issued in that region.

=== Compilation albums ===
Title	Details	Peak chart positions								Certifications (sales thresholds)
Title	Details	UK	AUS	DEN	FIN	IRE	JPN	NOR	SWE	Certifications (sales thresholds)
Sci-Fi Lullabies	Released: 6 October 1997; Label: Nude; Formats: CD, CS, DL, LP	9	—	11	12	—	—	22	16	
Singles	Released: 20 October 2003; Label: Sony Music UK; Formats: CD, CS, DL	31	123	9	35	47	67	14	—	BPI: Gold
See You in the Next Life...	Released: 12 February 2004; Label: Self-released; Formats: CD	—	—	—	—	—	—	—	—	
The Best of Suede	Released: 1 November 2010; Label: Universal UK; Formats: CD, DL	31	—	27	—	58	192	—	20	BPI: Silver
Beautiful Ones – An Introduction to Suede	Released: 27 May 2016; Label: Demon Music Group; Formats: DL	—	—	—	—	—	—	—	—	
Beautiful Ones: The Best of Suede 1992 – 2018	Released: 9 October 2020; Label: Demon Music Group; Formats: CD, LP, DL	16	—	—	—	—	—	—	—	BPI: Silver
"—" denotes a release that did not chart or was not issued in that region.

=== Live albums ===
Title	Details
Live in London	Released: 7 December 2010; Label: Simfy Live; Format: USB
Royal Albert Hall, 24 March 2010	Released: 2012; Label: Self-released; Format: CD+DVD, DL, LP
European Tour Live – O2 Academy, Leeds	Released: 26 October 2013; Label: Concert Live; Format: CD
European Tour Live – Ancienne Belgique, Brussels	Released: 1 November 2013; Label: Concert Live; Format: CD
Dog Man Star. 20th Anniversary Live. Royal Albert Hall.	Released: 18 April 2015; Label: Demon Music; Format: CD, DL, LP

=== Box sets ===
Title	Details	Peak chart positions
Title	Details	UK
The Vinyl Collection	Released: 21 October 2013; Label: Demon Music; Formats: 10×LP	—
7" Singles	Released: 14 April 2014; Label: Edsel; Formats: 24×7" vinyl	199
CD Singles	Released: 14 April 2014; Label: Edsel; Formats: 24×CD+DVD	—
The CD Album Box Set	Released: 26 May 2014; Label: Edsel; Formats: 8×CD	—
Studio Albums 93–16	Released: 8 November 2018; Label: Demon Music Group; Formats: 10×LP	—

== Singles ==
Title	Year	Peak chart positions										Certifications (sales thresholds)	Album
Title	Year	UK	AUS	DEN	FIN	GER	IRE	NOR	NZ	SWE	US Mod.	Certifications (sales thresholds)	Album
"The Drowners"	1992	49	39 (Note: "The Drowners" and "Metal Mickey" was released as a double-A sided single in Australia)	—	—	—	—	—	—	—	—		Suede
"Metal Mickey"	1992	17	39	—	—	—	—	—	—	33	7		Suede
"Animal Nitrate"	1993	7	89	—	—	—	11	—	11	21	—	BPI: Silver	Suede
"So Young"	1993	22	178	—	—	98	25	—	—	—	—		Suede
"Stay Together"	1994	3	104	—	15	—	18	—	47	10	—		Non-album single
"We Are the Pigs"	1994	18	—	—	—	—	—	—	—	34	—		Dog Man Star
"The Wild Ones"	1994	18	167	—	—	—	—	—	—	—	—		Dog Man Star
"New Generation"	1995	21	—	—	—	—	25	—	—	—	—		Dog Man Star
"Trash"	1996	3	119	3	1	—	19	12	—	5	—	BPI: Silver	Coming Up
"Beautiful Ones"	1996	8	—	14	6	—	—	—	—	11	—	BPI: Gold	Coming Up
"Saturday Night"	1997	6	—	4	7	—	—	—	—	11	—		Coming Up
"Lazy"	1997	9	156	9	10	—	—	—	—	19	—		Coming Up
"Filmstar"	1997	9	—	13	12	—	—	—	—	17	—		Coming Up
"Electricity"	1999	5	63	—	5	92	18	5	39	13	—		Head Music
"She's in Fashion"	1999	13	—	—	10	—	—	—	—	59	—		Head Music
"Everything Will Flow"	1999	24	—	—	20	—	—	—	—	55	— (Note: "Everything Will Flow" charted at number 28 on the US Hot Dance Music/Club Play chart.)		Head Music
"Can't Get Enough / Let Go"	1999	23	137	—	—	—	—	—	—	—	—		Head Music
"Let Go / Can't Get Enough" (Note: In Sweden "Let Go", originally the B-side to "Can't Get Enough", was released as the A-side of the single instead of "Can't Get Enough". Therefore, "Let Go" became the track played on Swedish radio and even charted as high as No. 5 on Swedish Radio (Sveriges Radio)'s Tracks-chart.)	2000	—	—	—	—	—	—	—	—	58	—		Non-album single
"Positivity"	2002	16	—	1	15	99	44	15	—	32	—		A New Morning
"Obsessions"	2002	29	—	—	—	—	—	—	—	—	—		A New Morning
"Attitude"/"Golden Gun"	2003	14	—	16	—	—	50	—	—	—	—		Singles
"Barriers"	2013	—	—	—	—	—	—	—	—	—	—		Bloodsports
"It Starts and Ends with You"	2013	—	—	—	—	—	—	—	—	—	—		Bloodsports
"Hit Me"	2013	—	—	—	—	—	—	—	—	—	—		Bloodsports
"For the Strangers"	2013	—	—	—	—	—	—	—	—	—	—		Bloodsports
"Outsiders"	2015	—	—	—	—	—	—	—	—	—	—		Night Thoughts
"Like Kids"	2015	—	—	—	—	—	—	—	—	—	—		Night Thoughts
"Pale Snow"	2016	—	—	—	—	—	—	—	—	—	—		Night Thoughts
"No Tomorrow"	2016	—	—	—	—	—	—	—	—	—	—		Night Thoughts
"What I'm Trying to Tell You"	2016	—	—	—	—	—	—	—	—	—	—		Night Thoughts
"The Invisibles"	2018	—	—	—	—	—	—	—	—	—	—		The Blue Hour
"Don't Be Afraid If Nobody Loves You"	2018	—	—	—	—	—	—	—	—	—	—		The Blue Hour
"Life Is Golden"	2018	—	—	—	—	—	—	—	—	—	—		The Blue Hour
"Flytipping"	2018	—	—	—	—	—	—	—	—	—	—		The Blue Hour
"Wastelands"	2018	—	—	—	—	—	—	—	—	—	—		The Blue Hour
"She Still Leads Me On"	2022	—	—	—	—	—	—	—	—	—	—		Autofiction
"15 Again"	2022	—	—	—	—	—	—	—	—	—	—		Autofiction
"That Boy on the Stage"	2022	—	—	—	—	—	—	—	—	—	—		Autofiction
"Disintegrate"	2025	—	—	—	—	—	—	—	—	—	—		Antidepressants
"Trance State"	2025	—	—	—	—	—	—	—	—	—	—		Antidepressants
"Dancing with the Europeans"	2025	—	—	—	—	—	—	—	—	—	—		Antidepressants
"—" denotes a release that did not chart or was not issued in that region.

== Other appearances ==
List of non-single guest appearances, showing year released and album name
Title	Year	Album
"Brass in Pocket"	1992	Ruby Trax: The NME's Roaring Forty
"My Insatiable One" (Live)	1993	Glastonbury 93: In a Field of Their Own Volume Two - Highlights From The NME Stage
"Shipbuilding"	1995	The Help Album
"The Drowners" (Session)	1996	Evening Session: Priority Tunes
"Heroine" (Live)	1996	...Later Volume One: Brit Beat
"Poor Little Rich Girl" (featuring Raissa)	1998	Twentieth-Century Blues: The Songs of Noël Coward
"Another No-One" (Live)	2001	NME Exclusives!
"Trash" (Live)	2014	Britpop at the BBC

== Video albums ==
Title	Details
Love and Poison	Released: 15 November 1993; Label: Sony/SMV Enterprises; Format: DVD, LD, VHS
Introducing the Band	Released: 16 September 1995; Label: Music Video Distributors; Format: DVD, VHS
Lost in T.V.	Released: 14 May 2002; Label: Sony International; Format: DVD, VHS
Royal Albert Hall, 24 March 2010	Released: 2012; Label: Self-released; Format: DVD
Night Thoughts – Film	Released: 22 January 2016; Label: Warner Music; Format: DVD
The Insatiable Ones	Released: 12 April 2019; Label: Self-released; Format: DVD

== Music videos ==
Title	Year	Director
"The Drowners"	1992	Lindy Heymann
"Metal Mickey"	1992	Lindy Heymann
"Animal Nitrate"	1993	Pedro Romhanyi
"So Young"	1993	David Lewis; Andy Crabb
"The Drowners" (US version)	1993	Matthew Amos
"Stay Together"	1994	Jon Klein
"We Are the Pigs"	1994	David Vital-Durand; Raphaël Vital-Durand
"The Wild Ones"	1994	Howard Greenhalgh
"New Generation"	1995	Richard Heslop
"Trash"	1996	David Mould
"Beautiful Ones"	1996	Pedro Romhanyi
"Saturday Night"	1997	Pedro Romhanyi
"Lazy"	1997	Pedro Romhanyi
"Filmstar"	1997	Zowie Broach
"Electricity"	1999	Mike Lipscombe
"She's in Fashion"	1999	Johan Renck
"Can't Get Enough" (Australian version)	1999	Simon Gilbert
"Everything Will Flow"	1999	Howard Greenhalgh
"Can't Get Enough"	1999	John Hillcoat
"Positivity"	2002	Julian Gibbs
"Obsessions"	2002	Grant Gee
"Attitude"	2003	Lindy Heymann
"It Starts and Ends with You"	2013	Giorgio Testi
"Hit Me"	2013	David Barnes
"For the Strangers"	2013	Ben Lankester
"Outsiders"	2015	Roger Sargent
"Like Kids"	2015	Roger Sargent
"Pale Snow"	2016	Roger Sargent
"No Tomorrow"	2016	Roger Sargent
"What I'm Trying to Tell You"	2016	Roger Sargent
"The Invisibles"	2018	Roger Sargent
"Life Is Golden"	2018	Mike Christie
"Wastelands"	2018	Giles Campbell Longley
