= Singles (Suede album) =

Compilation album by Suede
- Released: 20 October 2003
- Recorded: 1992–2003
- Genres: Britpop; alternative rock
- Length: 78:40
- Labels: Nude; Columbia
- Producers: Ed Buller; Steve Osborne; Stephen Street; John Leckie; Dave Eringa; Jim Abbiss; Tore Johansson; Mike Christie; Michael Ade

Suede chronology
A New Morning (2002)	Singles (2003)	See You in the Next Life... (2004)

Singles is a compilation album by English alternative rock band Suede, consisting of all of the band's singles over the course of their recording career from 1992 to 2003.

The album also contains two new songs: the single released from this compilation, "Attitude", and "Love the Way You Love". Also, the song "Trash" is an alternative version.

== Track listing ==
Professional ratings
Review scores
Source	Rating
The Age	4/5 stars
AllMusic	4.5/5 stars
Dotmusic	7/10
Drowned in Sound	3/5
entertainment.ie	4/5 stars
Irish Independent	4/5 stars
The New Zealand Herald	4/5 stars
NME	7/10
South China Morning Post	4/5 stars
The Times	3/5 stars

No.	Title	Writer(s)	Original album	Length
1.	"Beautiful Ones" (Edit)	Brett Anderson, Richard Oakes	Coming Up, 1996	3:34
2.	"Animal Nitrate" (Edit)	Anderson, Bernard Butler	Suede, 1993	3:09
3.	"Trash" (Alternative version)	Anderson, Oakes	Coming Up	3:48
4.	"Metal Mickey" (Edit)	Anderson, Butler	Suede	3:02
5.	"So Young"	Anderson, Butler	Suede	3:39
6.	"The Wild Ones" (Edit)	Anderson, Butler	Dog Man Star, 1994	4:17
7.	"Obsessions" (Edit)	Anderson, Oakes	A New Morning, 2002	3:44
8.	"Filmstar" (Edit)	Anderson, Oakes	Coming Up	3:14
9.	"Can't Get Enough"	Anderson, Neil Codling	Head Music, 1999	3:59
10.	"Everything Will Flow" (Edit)	Anderson, Oakes	Head Music	4:27
11.	"Stay Together" (Edit)	Anderson, Butler	Non-album single, 1994	3:55
12.	"Love the Way You Love"	Anderson	New song, 2003	3:37
13.	"The Drowners" (Edit)	Anderson, Butler	Suede	3:44
14.	"New Generation"	Anderson, Butler	Dog Man Star	4:36
15.	"Lazy"	Anderson	Coming Up	3:15
16.	"She's in Fashion" (Edit)	Anderson, Codling	Head Music	4:07
17.	"Attitude"	Anderson, Mat Osman	New song, 2003	3:05
18.	"Electricity" (Edit)	Anderson, Codling, Oakes	Head Music	4:25
19.	"We Are the Pigs" (Edit)	Anderson, Butler	Dog Man Star	3:56
20.	"Positivity"	Anderson, Oakes, Simon Gilbert, Osman, Codling	A New Morning	2:57
21.	"Saturday Night" (Edit)	Anderson, Oakes	Coming Up	3:59

=== Asian limited edition bonus VCD ===
Live performance recording from Suede's Up Close and Personal tour in Singapore on 15 August 2002.

1. "Positivity"
2. "The Wild Ones"
3. "Untitled"
4. "When the Rain Falls"
5. "Oceans"
6. "Trash"
7. "Lazy"
8. "The Power"
9. "She's in Fashion"

== Charts ==
Chart performance for Singles
Chart (2003)	Peak position
Australian Albums (ARIA)	123
Danish Albums (Hitlisten)	9
Finnish Albums (Suomen virallinen lista)	35
Irish Albums (IRMA)	47
Norwegian Albums (VG-lista)	14
Scottish Albums (Official Charts)	39
UK Albums (Official Charts)	31
