= See You in the Next Life... =

Compilation album by Suede
- Released: 12 February 2004
- Genre: Britpop
- Length: 52:29
- Label: Self-released; Demon (2020)

Suede chronology
Singles (2003)	See You in the Next Life... (2004)	The Best of Suede (2010)

See You in the Next Life... is a fan-club release album by the English alternative rock band Suede, released in 2004.

The album was limited to 2,000 copies and is mostly demos and remixes of previously released songs. "Elaine Paige" is an alternate version of "Another No One", a B-side on the "Trash" CD2 single. "La Puissance" is a live version of "The Power" (from Suede's Dog Man Star album) sung in French.

On 29 August 2020, the band and Demon Records released a red vinyl edition for Record Store Day, marking the first edition in this format.

== Artwork ==
The photo on the cover was taken from a 1981 photo book called Flash-back by Belgian artist Jean Pierre Muhlstein. The model on the photo is French pornstar Marilyn Jess.

== Track listing ==
1. "She" (strings) – 4:31
2. "Elaine Paige" – 3:23
3. "La Puissance" – 1:22
4. "Lazy" (demo) – 3:11
5. "By the Sea" (acoustic version) – 4:02
6. "Indian Strings" (Protocol demo) – 4:06
7. "She's in Fashion" (Protocol demo) – 6:22
8. "Simon" (demo) – 4:41
9. "Beautiful Loser" (Parkgate demo) – 3:51
10. "When the Rain Falls" (Stanbridge demo) – 4:30
11. "Untitled" (Stanbridge demo) – 3:35
12. "Attitude" (Mick Jones remix) – 3:36 / "Still Life" (strings) (hidden track) – 5:19
