= Le cool =

Publishing company based in Barcelona, Spain

le cool Publishing SL
- Company type: Limited
- Industry: Media, publishing
- Founded: 2003 - Closed
- Headquarters: Barcelona, Spain
- Key people: René Lönngren (founder, CEO), Andrew Losowsky (editorial director)
- Products: Online magazines, custom publishing, guidebooks
- Website: www.lecool.com

Le cool was an independent publishing company based in Barcelona, Spain.

Founded in 2003 by Swedish emigrant René Lönngren, the company publishes content concerning unusual events and places within European cities.

Its main products are weekly online magazines detailing cultural activities under the name le cool magazine and a series of Weird and Wonderful Guides to five cities in Europe. It also produces publications for clients, including the inflight magazine Ling for the Spanish airline Vueling, which won a gold medal in the 2008 awards of the American-based Society of Publication Designers.

Le cool sends weekly emails to around 200,000 subscribers in nine European cities (Barcelona, Budapest, Dublin, Istanbul, Lisbon, London, Madrid, Rome and Moscow) and published a guidebook to Barcelona in 2006 and to Amsterdam, Lisbon, London and Madrid in 2008.

Its guidebook series is unusual for the quality of its design, in particular for working with local designers in each city.

The editor of le cool's London email magazine and guidebook, Mat Osman, is the bass guitarist in Suede.

Le Cool has expanded to include the Le Cool Agency, a content agency that helps agencies and their clients to connect better with their customers through supporting their communication with great content.
