= A New Morning =

Studio album by Suede
- Released: 30 September 2002
- Recorded: 2000–2002
- Studios: Townhouse, London; RAK, London ("Positivity")
- Genre: Glam rock
- Length: 38:59
- Label: Epic
- Producers: Stephen Street, John Leckie

Suede chronology
Head Music (1999)	A New Morning (2002)	Singles (2003)

Singles from A New Morning
- 1. "Positivity" Released: 16 September 2002; 2. "Obsessions" Released: 18 November 2002

A New Morning is the fifth studio album by English alternative rock band Suede, released in September 2002. By the time the album was released, public interest in the band had waned, as shown by the poor charting of both the album and singles. Despite this, however, the album received moderate praise from critics. It is the only Suede album not to be released in the US. It was the last studio album released by the band before their seven-year hiatus and reunion in 2010. Before recording took place, keyboardist and guitarist Neil Codling left the band due to his health concern, and later was replaced by former Strangelove multi-instrumentalist, Alex Lee. As Codling returned to the band for their 2010 reunion, this is their only studio album to have featured Lee.

== Background ==
The creation of Suede's fifth studio album A New Morning, was long and costly. Following the release of their 1999 album Head Music and subsequent tour, keyboardist Neil Codling announced his departure from the group on 23 March 2001, citing problems with Chronic fatigue syndrome. Singer Brett Anderson was frustrated at Codling's decision, but understood the reasons behind his departure: "He couldn't help it, I know, but I did feel aggrieved. I felt let down. But more at the universe than at Neil." Codling was replaced by former Strangelove multi-instrumentalist Alex Lee.

Anderson also had become sober for this record, overcoming his crack addiction and claiming that A New Morning was "the first ever Suede record that wasn't influenced in its making by drugs." Anderson wrote lyrics isolated in a country house in Surrey away from the rest of the band, where he immersed himself in music and literature. He read Atomised by Michel Houellebecq and books by Albert Camus, Leonard Cohen and Paul Auster. Anderson says, "I created a deliberate vacuum so all these influences would flood in. I spent a lot of time walking in the countryside, sometimes for hours and hours, fascinated by nature and its battle with concrete and steel. I was living in Concrete Island by J. G. Ballard."

== Recording ==
"The fact that we made this album is one of the things that I regret most about Suede's career. The band would have been loved more if we had stopped making music before this. When we made it, we were very confused about what we wanted the band to be and where we wanted it to go. There was a part of me that wanted to make an electronic album and part of me that wanted to make a folk album. So we combined those elements and made a very confused record."

— Brett Anderson reflecting on his overall regret of the album in 2011.

The band began recording demos at Stanbridge Farm Studios in West Sussex in July 2000. In October the band took a break from writing to perform their only gig of the year, which took place in Reykjavík, Iceland, where they premiered nine new songs. The group originally began working with American producer Tony Hoffer in 2001, and anticipated having a single released by Autumn. Hoffer and Anderson had originally met in a toilet at Paisley Park in Minneapolis, Minnesota, where the two hit it off, finding several common musical interests. The meeting led to Anderson asking for Hoffer's input on some of the group's recent work.

In February 2001 the band took up residency at Rockfield Studios in Monmouth, Wales for a three-week trial run with Hoffer. The band were unimpressed with the trial run, especially Simon Gilbert and Richard Oakes, who both had strong opinions on the results. Nevertheless, the band decided to record the album with Hoffer and descended on Parkgate Studios, Hastings, in May with their new member Alex Lee, following Codling's departure. Although the group recorded ten songs with Hoffer that Anderson said were the "best we've written," most of the material recorded with him producing was scrapped. In September the group recorded two songs with ex The Stone Roses producer John Leckie. The versions of "Beautiful Loser" and "Positivity" were promising; however, Leckie had other commitments, forcing Suede to reconsider their options.

The group ultimately decided to work with Stephen Street, who was known for his collaborations with The Smiths and Blur. With Street, the band recorded most of the released material in two months. All the songs from the album were produced by Street, except "Positivity" which was produced by John Leckie, and "You Belong to Me" which was produced by Dave Eringa. Recording with Street began in January 2002, with the album finally being completed on 23 March 2002. Osman stated recording with Street took eight weeks, saying: "We started every day at 11am and didn't leave until one o'clock the following morning." Anderson had high praise for the producer, saying "Stephen has just turned this whole album around, he really has. Every song he's just taken and done something special with... From the millions of other sessions we've done for this album, there's just no comparison."

Overall, seven different recording studios and four producers were used during the two-year recording span for A New Morning, and costs estimated at around £1 million. Street stated that the album was a "return to classic song construction," and bassist Mat Osman said that lyrically A New Morning is "very positive and upbeat."

== Release and promotion ==
Promotion for the album began on 4 May 2002 with a secret fan-club show. Suede played to one hundred fans at their London rehearsal studio the Depot. The secret gig coincided with the tenth anniversary release of debut single "The Drowners", which was marked by an earlier club night at the Liquid Rooms in King's Cross. Fans were then transported to the rehearsals in two buses where the band performed fifteen songs, including eight new songs from the new album. The album was released 30 September 2002 and peaked at number 24, which is the lowest chart position of all the band's studio albums, and the only album not to chart in the top ten. The album remains the only studio album from Suede's catalogue not to be released in the US. The lead single for the album was "Positivity", which received a large amount of criticism from fans and the press. NME writer Julian Marshall wrote that "Positivity" was "[G]reeted with an apathetic shrug by everyone but the most devoted." Although it peaked at No. 16 on the charts and Anderson initially felt happy about the song, his feelings towards it would change in time. He later said of "Positivity" that "When I first wrote it I thought it was a masterpiece but soon realized that many people were genuinely offended by it." "Obsessions" was the second single released and despite being better received than "Positivity", the song charted at a lower position and was ultimately the final single released from the album. The album had first-week sales of 10,152 units, and went on to sell 21,943 units after 12 weeks.

== Critical reception ==
Professional ratings
Aggregate scores
Source	Rating
Metacritic	65/100
Review scores
Source	Rating
AllMusic	3.5/5 stars
The Gazette	3.5/5 stars
The Guardian	3/5 stars
The Independent	3/5 stars
NME	7/10
Pitchfork	7.0/10
Q	3/5 stars
The Scotsman	2/5 stars
The Sydney Morning Herald	3/5 stars
The Times	3/5 stars

Despite poor sales, the album satisfied press critics. At Metacritic, which assigns a normalised rating out of 100 to reviews from mainstream critics, A New Morning has an average score of 65 based on 8 reviews, indicating "generally favorable reviews". Stephen Thomas Erlewine of AllMusic felt that the album was a "solid, succinct collection of tuneful, stylish modern-day glam pop." He said it is not "a new beginning, nor does it take many risks, but it does find Suede in top form with good songs and an appealing record." Jason Fox of NME said that "A New Morning sees Suede show off their vulnerable side again. It won't attract any new admirers but old fans will love them more for it." The Guardian's Steve Poole said that "'Beautiful Loser' and 'Astrogirl' gesture at past glories like 'Heroine' or 'The Chemistry Between Us', but lack that assured melodic grandiosity." He did have positive praise for the album saying: "there are moments of beauty, in 'Untitled' and the delicate miniature 'Morning'." Gareth Grundy of Q magazine was somewhat mixed, writing: "The faithful will be overjoyed: despite the optimistic title, there's nothing new here, only a distillation of trace elements from previous outings." Much of the album's songs and lyrics were criticised, with the exception of "Obsessions", which he called "the album's one true belter, riding squeling harmonica and oddly compelling lyrics." He summed up, saying the band "seem wholly uninterested in attracting passing trade. They might have always lived in their own world but it used to at least slightly resemble the one outside. Not any more." Andy Gill of The Independent felt the band had little new to offer, saying: "It may seem like A New Morning to the band, but others may find it more like Groundhog Day."

As the only Suede album not to be released in the US, there were no reviews from any US media. However, the album was widely covered by the Canadian music press, where it was met with a mixed reception. Rob Bolton of Exclaim! wrote: "Unfortunately, the songs seem a little lacklustre, and Brett Anderson's voice struggles, at times, showing the signs of age and abuse." However, he felt that it was better than Head Music and that "there are tracks like 'Obsessions' and 'One Hit To The Body' that recall what made Suede the trend-setting band that they were." Mike Bell of Jam! was harshly critical, writing: "Gone are most of the theatrics. Gone, too, is the powerful whine in Anderson's voice, and all that's left are quite silly faux clever lyrics and debatable melodies." Lorraine Carpenter of the Montreal Mirror felt that the record "is tainted by tired lyrical refrains and vocal melodies." Instead, she recommended readers listen to Suede's first three albums, while leaving A New Morning for "discount-bin destiny".

== Aftermath ==
Suede released a compilation album Singles in 2003 which featured two new songs, "Love the Way You Love" and the single "Attitude". Shortly after the release of Singles the group issued a joint statement on 5 November explaining that outside of the remaining dates on their current tour, that Suede would not be working together for the foreseeable future: "Suede would like to announce that from next year (2004) they will be working on their own individual projects." The announcement confirmed rumours of the group splitting up since the release of A New Morning. Anderson later stated that he felt he had to break out of Suede as he was in an artistic dead end saying: "I need to do whatever it takes to get my demon back."

== Track listing ==
No.	Title	Writer(s)	Length
1.	"Positivity"	Brett Anderson; Mat Osman; Simon Gilbert; Richard Oakes; Neil Codling	2:56
2.	"Obsessions"	Anderson; Oakes	4:11
3.	"Lonely Girls"	Anderson; Codling	3:13
4.	"Lost in TV"	Anderson; Osman	3:40
5.	"Beautiful Loser"	Anderson; Alex Lee; Oakes	3:38
6.	"Streetlife"	Anderson; Lee	2:51
7.	"Astrogirl"	Anderson; Lee	4:35
8.	"Untitled" "... Morning"	Anderson; Oakes	3:45; 2:15
9.	"One Hit to the Body"	Anderson; Oakes; Codling	3:07
10.	"When the Rain Falls"	Anderson	4:30
Total length:			38:59

European bonus track
No.	Title	Writer(s)	Length
11.	"You Belong to Me" / "Oceans" (hidden track, begins at 13:30)	Anderson	17:29
Total length:			56:48

=== Another Morning? (alternate 2002 version) ===
Album
No.	Title	Writer(s)	Length
1.	"Positivity (Tony Hoffer Version)"	Brett Anderson; Mat Osman; Simon Gilbert; Richard Oakes; Neil Codling	3:05
2.	"Obsessions (2khz Version)"	Anderson; Oakes	3:55
3.	"Lonely Girls (2khz Version)"	Anderson; Codling	3:19
4.	"Lost in TV (Stanbridge Version)"	Anderson; Osman	3:49
5.	"Beautiful Loser (Tony Hoffer Version)"	Anderson; Alex Lee; Oakes	3:44
6.	"Streetlife (2khz Version)"	Anderson; Lee	2:53
7.	"Astrogirl (2khz Version)"	Anderson; Lee	4:40
8.	"Untitled (Tony Hoffer Version)"	Anderson; Oakes	4:31
9.	"...Morning (Demo Version)"	Anderson	2:12
10.	"One Hit to the Body (Tony Hoffer Version)"	Anderson; Oakes; Codling	3:25
11.	"When the Rain Falls (Tony Hoffer Version)"	Anderson	4:16

=== 2011 remastered and expanded version ===
Disc One: Album
No.	Title	Writer(s)	Length
1.	"Positivity"	Brett Anderson; Mat Osman; Simon Gilbert; Richard Oakes; Neil Codling	2:56
2.	"Obsessions"	Anderson; Oakes	4:11
3.	"Lonely Girls"	Anderson; Codling	3:13
4.	"Lost in TV"	Anderson; Osman	3:40
5.	"Beautiful Loser"	Anderson; Alex Lee; Oakes	3:38
6.	"Streetlife"	Anderson; Lee	2:51
7.	"Astrogirl"	Anderson; Lee	4:35
8.	"Untitled"	Anderson; Oakes	3:45
9.	"...Morning"	Anderson	2:15
10.	"One Hit to the Body"	Anderson; Oakes; Codling	3:07
11.	"When the Rain Falls"	Anderson	4:30
12.	"Oceans"	Anderson	4:13

Disc One: Demos
No.	Title	Writer(s)	Length
13.	"Obsessions" (2KHz Demo)	Anderson; Oakes	3:52
14.	"Positivity" (Hoffer Version)	Anderson; Osman; Gilbert; Oakes; Codling	3:01
15.	"Buckley (Simon)" (demo)	Anderson; Codling	4:29
16.	"Bony (Untitled)" (Stanbridge Demo)	Anderson; Oakes	3:54
17.	"Beautiful Loser" (Parkgate Demo)	Anderson; Lee; Oakes	3:50
18.	"Lost in TV" (Parkgate Demo)	Anderson; Osman	4:29
19.	"Lonely Girls" (Parkgate Demo)	Anderson; Codling	3:22
20.	"Cheap" (Four track demo)	Anderson; Oakes	4:45
21.	"When the Rain Falls" (Stanbridge Demo)	Anderson; Oakes	4:30

13 & 14 were taken from the download of the alternative version of the album, Another Morning?, made available from the now-defunct website at the link included on the original CD.

Disc Two: The B-Sides and more
No.	Title	Writer(s)	Length
1.	"Simon"	Anderson; Codling	4:34
2.	"Cheap"	Anderson; Oakes	4:42
3.	"One Love"	Anderson; Oakes; Osman; Tony Hoffer	4:01
4.	"Superstar"	Anderson; Oakes; Codling; Osman; Lee; Gilbert	4:11
5.	"Colours"	Anderson	3:30
6.	"Campfire Song"	Anderson; Codling	5:35
7.	"Cool Thing"	Anderson; Oakes; Osman	3:05
8.	"Instant Sunshine"	Anderson; Codling	3:49
9.	"UFO"	Anderson	3:28
10.	"Rainy Day Girl"	Anderson	4:13
11.	"Hard Candy"	Anderson	2:46
12.	"ABC Song"	Anderson; Oakes; Gilbert; Osman; Lee	4:01
13.	"You Belong to Me"	Anderson	3:24
14.	"Love the Way You Love"	Anderson	3:35
15.	"Attitude"	Anderson; Osman	3:04
16.	"Golden Gun"	Anderson; Osman	3:05
17.	"Oxygen"	Anderson; Oakes	4:05

Disc Two: Extra Tracks
No.	Title	Writer(s)	Length
18.	"Golden Gun" (Z One Demo)	Anderson; Osman	2:58
19.	"Love the Way You Love" (Brett's original 4 track demo)	Anderson	4:38
20.	"Refugees" (Previously unreleased)	Anderson; Lee	4:31

DVD: Singles Videos
No.	Title	Length
1.	"Positivity"	3:10
2.	"Obsessions"	3:50
3.	"Attitude (With Brett)"	3:29

DVD: Bonus Videos
No.	Title	Length
4.	"Simon ('Far From China' Opening Titles)"	4:38
5.	"Positivity (Early Recording Session)"	3:22
6.	"Attitude (Without Brett)"	3:28

DVD: Suede: Up Close and Personal (Live at Mediacorp Studio, Singapore, 15th August 2002) (42:14)
No.	Title	Length
7.	"Positivity"
8.	"The Wild Ones"
9.	"Untitled"
10.	"When the Rain Falls"
11.	"Oceans"
12.	"Trash"
13.	"Lazy"
14.	"The Power"
15.	"She's in Fashion"

DVD: Suede Live at FNAC, Madrid, 30th September 2002 (21:30)
No.	Title	Length
16.	"Positivity"
17.	"Obsessions"
18.	"Everything Will Flow"
19.	"Trash"
20.	"Beautiful Ones"

DVD: Bonus Feature
No.	Title	Length
21.	"Brett Anderson, Richard Oakes and Neil Codling 2011 Interview"	15:13

== Personnel ==
Suede

- Brett Anderson – vocals (all), percussion (except 7, 11B), acoustic guitar (8B)
- Simon Gilbert – drums (except 8B, 11B)
- Alex Lee – acoustic guitar (except 3, 4, 8, 11B; strummed: 3), keyboards (2, 5, 11), harmonica (2, 11A), Wurlitzer (4, 9), piano (7, 8A), Clavinet (1, 8B), organ (4, 8B), electric guitar (10; verse: 8A), synthesiser (4), Rhodes (6), Mellotron (7), Prophet synthesiser (9), backing vocals (4, 8A)
- Richard Oakes – electric guitar (except 3, 4, 8, 10, 11B; chorus: 8A), acoustic guitar (4, 8, 11B; picked: 3), piano (3, 4, 10), Rhodes (1), Clavinet (9), backing vocals (4, 6–8, 10, 11A)
- Neil Codling – keyboards (11B)
- Mat Osman – electric bass (except 8B, 11B), Hammond organ (11B)

Additional musicians

- Andrew Skeet – string arrangements
- Millennia Strings – strings
  - Everton Nelson – violins (1, 3, 7)
  - Gillon Cameron – violins (1, 3, 7)
  - Roy Theaker – violins (3, 7)
  - Lucy Wilkins – violins (3, 7)
  - Stephen Hussery – violins (3, 7)
  - Richard George – violins (1)
  - Frances Dewar – violins (1)
  - Chris George – violins (1)
  - Catherine Browning – violins (1)
  - Chris Worsey – cellos (1, 3, 7)
  - Ian Burdge – cellos (1, 3, 7)
- John Brandham – car horn (8B)

Technical

- Stephen Street – production (except 1), post-production (1), mixing
- Tom Stanley – engineering (except 1)
- John Leckie – production (1)
- Dan Grech-Marguerat – engineering (1)
- Gordon Vicary – mastering

Artwork

- Blue Source – art direction
- Kate Gibb – screenprints
- Henrik Bulow – photography (band except Alex Lee)
- Chris Lopez – photography (Alex Lee)

== Charts ==
Chart performance for A New Morning
Chart (2002)	Peak position
Australian Albums (ARIA)	57
Belgian Albums (Ultratop Flanders)	44
Belgian Albums (Ultratop Wallonia)	49
Danish Albums (Hitlisten)	4
Dutch Albums (Album Top 100)	81
Finnish Albums (Suomen virallinen lista)	9
French Albums (SNEP)	68
German Albums (Offizielle Top 100)	71
Irish Albums (IRMA)	46
Norwegian Albums (VG-lista)	6
Scottish Albums (Official Charts)	31
Singaporean Albums (RIAS)	8
Swedish Albums (Sverigetopplistan)	19
UK Albums (Official Charts)	24

== Bibliography ==
- Barnett, David (2003). Love and Poison. Carlton Publishing Group. ISBN 0-233-00094-1.
