= Positivity (Suede song) =

2002 single by Suede

Single by Suede

from the album A New Morning
- Released: 16 September 2002
- Length: 2:55
- Label: Epic
- Songwriter: Suede
- Producers: John Leckie; Stephen Street; Suede; Ken Thomas; Dick Meaney; Alex Silva

Suede singles chronology
"Can't Get Enough" (1999)	"Positivity" (2002)	"Obsessions" (2002)

"Positivity" is the first single from the album A New Morning by Suede, released on 16 September 2002 through Epic Records. Although it received mixed reviews from critics and fans, the song became one of the band's final hit singles, reaching number one in Denmark, number 12 in Spain, number 15 in Finland and Norway, and number 16 in their native United Kingdom.

== Background ==
The single is a significant departure from the sleazy rock characteristic of the previous two albums, and has a far more warm and acoustic sound to it. The single had various producers: "Positivity" was produced by John Leckie, "One Love", "Superstar" and "Colours" were produced by Stephen Street, "Simon" was produced by Suede and Ken Thomas, "Cheap" was produced by Suede and Dick Meaney while "Campfire Song" was produced by Suede and Alex Silva.

Initially Brett Anderson liked the song and considered it one of his favourites on the album prior to its release. However, his views on the song would later change, saying: "When I first wrote it I thought it was a masterpiece but soon realized that many people were genuinely offended by it." On the meaning of the song, Anderson said it's about "someone who's really close to me, who doesn't have much in life but manages to deal with it incredibly well." The video for the title song was directed by Julian Gibbs.

== Critical reception ==
The single garnered mixed reviews from critics. Paul McNamee of NME felt that the song lacked the "affected social commentary" of the songs from Coming Up and that Anderson's lyrics were of a lower standard. In conclusion, he offered the band the following advice: "For the love of God chaps, you still have fans. Go quietly now, and they'll remain true." Ben Gilbert of Dotmusic rated the song four out of ten. He wrote: "'Positivity' finds Anderson, who now looks more like a body builder than a smack-infested rock'n'roll poet, using credit card as a rather desperate metaphor for love. There is precious little here to suggest Suede have anything left in the tank, amidst a lame swathe of breezy strings." On the other hand, Music Week called it "a heartfelt song which sounds catchy enough for mainstream radio."

Despite the negativity surrounding the song, "Positivity" reached number 16 on the UK Singles Chart and number one in Denmark, making it the third European number-one single by the band after "Trash", which topped the Finnish Singles Chart in August 1996; and "Beautiful Ones", which topped the Icelandic Singles Chart in November 1996.

== Track listings ==
UK CD1

1. "Positivity" (Brett Anderson, Richard Oakes, Simon Gilbert, Mat Osman, Neil Codling) – 2:57
2. "One Love" (Anderson, Oakes, Osman, Tony Hoffer) – 4:03
3. "Simon" (Anderson, Codling) – 4:33
4. "Positivity" (video) (Anderson, Oakes, Gilbert, Osman, Codling) – 2:57

UK CD2

1. "Positivity" (Anderson, Oakes, Gilbert, Osman, Codling) – 2:57
2. "Superstar" (Anderson, Oakes, Codling, Gilbert, Osman, Alex Lee) – 4:11
3. "Cheap" (Anderson, Oakes) – 4:41

UK DVD single

1. "Positivity" (video) (Anderson, Oakes, Gilbert, Osman, Codling) – 2:57
2. "Colours" (Anderson) – 3:30
3. "Campfire Song" (Anderson, Codling) – 4:12
4. Extra feature (Suede secret gig—video version) – 2:00

European CD single

1. "Positivity" (Anderson, Oakes, Gilbert, Osman, Codling) – 2:57
2. "Simon" (Anderson, Codling) – 4:33

Canadian CD single

1. "Positivity" (Anderson, Oakes, Gilbert, Osman, Codling)
2. "One Love" (Anderson, Oakes, Osman, Hoffer)
3. "Simon" (Anderson, Codling)

Japanese CD single

1. "Positivity" (Anderson, Oakes, Gilbert, Osman, Codling)
2. "One Love" (Anderson, Oakes, Osman, Hoffer)
3. "Cheap" (Anderson, Oakes)

== Charts ==
Chart (2002)	Peak position
Canada (Nielsen SoundScan)	13
Denmark (Tracklisten)	1
Europe (Eurochart Hot 100)	42
Finland (Suomen virallinen lista)	15
Germany (GfK)	99
Ireland (IRMA)	44
Italy (FIMI)	24
Norway (VG-lista)	15
Scotland Singles (OCC)	23
Spain (PROMUSICAE)	12
Sweden (Sverigetopplistan)	32
UK Singles (OCC)	16

== Release history ==
Region	Date	Format(s)	Label(s)	Ref.
Denmark	16 September 2002	CD	Epic	
United Kingdom	16 September 2002	CD	Epic	
Japan	19 September 2002	CD	Epic	
