= Obsessions =

2002 single by Suede

Single by Suede

from the album A New Morning
- Released: 18 November 2002
- Length: 4:11
- Label: Epic
- Songwriters: Brett Anderson; Richard Oakes
- Producer: Stephen Street

Suede singles chronology
"Positivity" (2002)	"Obsessions" (2002)	"Attitude" / "Golden Gun" (2003)

"Obsessions" is the second single from English rock band Suede's fifth studio album, A New Morning (2002). It was released on 18 November 2002 through Epic Records, reaching number 29 on the UK Singles Chart and number 19 in Spain.

== Background ==
Though the single reached only number 29 on the UK Singles Chart, the song is considered a favourite from this era among fans. The single had various producers: "Obsessions", "Cool Thing" and "ABC Song" were produced by Stephen Street, "Instant Sunshine" was produced by Suede and Alex Silva, "UFO" was produced by Suede and Cameron Craig, "Rainy Day Girl" was produced by Suede and Sean Genockey while "Hard Candy" was produced by Tony Hoffer. The up-tempo song, whose lyrics focus on a relationship is somewhat reminiscent of Suede's biggest selling single "Trash".

"Obsessions" is a fan favourite of the later Suede and is notable as the only song from A New Morning that Suede performed at their 2010 reunion gigs. It was also the only addition from A New Morning to appear on the 2010 compilation The Best of Suede. The video for the title song was directed by Grant Gee. The lead guitarist's brother, Stephen Oakes, worked as a runner on this video too. Suede invited fans to appear in the video shoot, which took place at the Marquee Club, now known as the O2 Academy Islington.

== Critical reception ==
NME writer Julian Marshall appeared to be clairvoyant with the future of Suede's demise, stating in his 2002 review of the song: "The sad truth is that 'Obsessions' may be Suede's last half-decent single. Sounding like 'Trash' mark 2, it's the best pick from an album that remains about as troubling to the UK Top Ten as The Very Best of Echobelly. If Brett [Anderson] hasn’t made any resolutions for 2003 yet, let NME offer some advice - knock out the Greatest Hits and a final tour now, before everyone stops caring altogether." The Guardian's Pete Stanton was favourable, who wrote in his review: "Brett Anderson's vocals can often sound not unlike a cat complaining to be let inside, but on this track he's toned down his trademark wail from an 11 to about a seven. The song is a lot better for this decision and dips and soars in all the right places."

In a more mixed assessment, Gareth Dobson of Drowned in Sound rated the single six out of ten. He felt that Suede's music and lyrics offered nothing new. While praising it as one of "Anderson’s best vocal performances," he said that the band produced "another sublime chorus of glittered sadness. Nothing changes in Suede world."

== Track listings ==
UK CD1
No.	Title	Writer(s)	Length
1.	"Obsessions" (radio edit)	Brett Anderson, Richard Oakes	3:41
2.	"Cool Thing"	Anderson, Oakes, Mat Osman	3:08
3.	"Instant Sunshine"	Anderson, Neil Codling	3:51
4.	"Obsessions" (live video from the Marquee Club, London)

UK CD2
No.	Title	Writer(s)	Length
1.	"Obsessions" (album version)	Anderson, Oakes	4:10
2.	"UFO"	Anderson	3:29
3.	"Rainy Day Girl"	Anderson	4:14
4.	"Obsessions" (live video from the Scala, London)

UK DVD single
No.	Title	Writer(s)	Length
1.	"Obsessions" (video)
2.	"Hard Candy" (audio)	Anderson
3.	"ABC Song" (audio)	Anderson, Oakes, Simon Gilbert, Osman, Alex Lee
4.	"Extra Feature" (developing "Obsessions")

European CD single
No.	Title	Writer(s)	Length
1.	"Obsessions" (radio edit)	Anderson, Oakes	3:41
2.	"Cool Thing"	Anderson, Oakes, Osman	3:08

Canadian CD single
No.	Title	Writer(s)	Length
1.	"Obsessions" (radio edit)	Anderson, Oakes	3:41
2.	"Cool Thing"	Anderson, Oakes, Osman	3:08
3.	"Instant Sunshine"	Anderson, Codling	3:51

== Charts ==
Chart (2002)	Peak position
Scotland Singles (OCC)	40
Spain (PROMUSICAE)	19
UK Singles (OCC)	29

== Release history ==
Region	Date	Format(s)	Label(s)	Ref.
United Kingdom	18 November 2002	CD	Epic	
Denmark	25 November 2002	CD	Epic	
