= Dog Man Star =

Studio album by Suede
- Released: 10 October 1994
- Recorded: 22 March–26 July 1994
- Studios: Master Rock in London; CTS in London (orchestra)
- Genres: Art rock; glam rock; alternative rock; Britpop
- Length: 57:50
- Label: Nude
- Producer: Ed Buller

Suede chronology
Suede (1993)	Dog Man Star (1994)	Coming Up (1996)

Singles from Dog Man Star
- 1. "We Are the Pigs" Released: 12 September 1994; 2. "The Wild Ones" Released: 7 November 1994; 3. "New Generation" Released: 30 January 1995

Dog Man Star is the second album by English alternative rock band Suede, released in October 1994 on Nude Records. The album was recorded in London at Master Rock studios in early 1994, and was produced by Ed Buller. It was the last Suede album to feature guitarist Bernard Butler; growing tensions between him and singer Brett Anderson ended with Butler leaving the band before recording was complete. As a result, some tracks on the album had to be finished with the assistance of session musicians.

In contrast to their debut album Suede, which exhibited the influences of David Bowie and the Smiths, Dog Man Star exhibits a more varied aesthetic and draws from a wider range of influences. Although it did not sell on the same scale as its predecessor, it reached number three on the UK Albums Chart and was certified as gold by the BPI in November 1994. Described by Rolling Stone as "one of the most pretentious albums ever released by a major label," the record was released in a different UK musical climate to their hitherto discography. Out-of-step with the mainstream music scene, it featured the band diverting away from the "Britpop pack" of bands.

While Dog Man Star was acclaimed by many reviewers as a masterpiece, the trend towards "lad pop" saw its chart and sales success obscured. It was generally overlooked at the time, and it polarised American critics, some labelling it as pretentious. The album has over time garnered wider acclaim from critics. In the decade between Suede's 2003 separation and the release of Bloodsports, Dog Man Star steadily gained a strong following as a classic rock record. In October 2013, NME magazine placed the album at number 31 in its list of the 500 greatest albums of all time.

== Background ==
In early 1994, when Suede were about to release the standalone single "Stay Together", the morale within the group was at an all-time low. Butler's father had died just as the band were about to begin their second American tour. The first week of the tour was cancelled, and Suede flew back to London from New York. When the tour did resume, Butler—not only recently bereaved but now engaged to his fiancée Elisa—distanced himself from the rest of the band far more than before. According to Butler, "they got really resentful of the fact that they were on tour with someone who didn't want to party". He even travelled separately, either alone, by taxi, or on the tour bus of support act the Cranberries. Then, in Atlanta, Suede suffered the ignominy of having to open for the Cranberries, who had become a bigger draw, thanks to their recent hit "Linger". The band agreed to let the Cranberries go on last in three places, given that they were picking up airplay; Anderson said the "whole rivalry thing was blown out of all proportion." By the time of their arrival in New York, Suede had enough, and the last few dates were cancelled. According to drummer Simon Gilbert, Butler was becoming intolerable and impossible to work with, and the band could not function together any longer. To record Suede's next album Anderson moved to Highgate, north London, and began to write lyrics while living in a secluded flat; a time which is detailed in the band biography Love and Poison.

The album was later described by writer Nick Duerden as "the most pompous, overblown British rock record of the decade". Anderson has said that its overblown sound was down to his use of psychedelic drugs: "I was doing an awful lot of acid at the time, and I think it was this that gave us the confidence to push boundaries." He has also said that he thrived on the surreal environment he lived in at the time; next door were a sect known as the Mennonites, who would often sing hymns during Anderson's drug binges. After the success of their debut album, Suede were hailed as the inventors of Britpop, something they were proud of for a short while. However, Britpop started to be dominated by the other bands, notably Blur, Oasis and Pulp. This disgusted Anderson, who called Britpop "a musical Carry On film." Fearing he was on a collision course of becoming a celebrity, Anderson deliberately distanced himself from the scene, which prompted his relocation to Highgate. "We could not have been more uninterested in that whole boozy, cartoon-like, fake working-class thing", the singer said in 2008. "As soon as we became aware of it, we went away and wrote Dog Man Star. You could not find a less Britpop record. It's tortured, epic, extremely sexual and personal. None of those things apply to Britpop."

== Recording and production ==
The album was recorded between 22 March and 26 July 1994 at Master Rock Studios, Kilburn, London. The rehearsals were very tense and would inevitably split the band into two separate camps. Butler had his own agenda, and he frequently clashed with the rest of the band and producer Ed Buller, over whom he had concerns during the recording of the first album. According to Buller, Butler and the rest of the band were not in the studio together once during recording, perhaps only for a matter of hours.

Buller has stated that the recording process had some "happy accidents" during recording. Butler recorded separately from the rest of the band in a purpose-built lounge. There was a TV in the lounge and Butler can be heard tuning the TV at the beginning of "The Asphalt World". At the end of the song, Butler can be heard changing channels and picking up a section of dialogue from Lauren Bacall from the film Woman's World. Buller also talked of the impromptu recording of Butler playing the intro to "The Wild Ones" on a dobro outside as he sat on the roof of his car.

Butler seemed to antagonise his bandmates when he appeared on the front cover of Vox magazine under the tag line "Brett drives me insane." In a rare interview, in that he only ever would do press interviews on the pretext it was about guitars, he said of Anderson: "He's not a musician at all. It's very difficult for him to get around anything that isn't ABC." A despondent Anderson remembers reading the article the same morning he was recording the vocals for "The Asphalt World": "I remember trying to channel all this hurt that I was feeling and the iciness I was feeling into the vocal." Butler later apologised to Anderson over the incident.

Musical differences arose over "The Asphalt World". The final version on the album has a duration of 9:25, edited from a much longer recording. According to bass player Mat Osman, Butler's initial creation was a 25-minute piece with an eight-minute guitar solo. However, according to Anderson, the composition was 18 minutes long, and was a pre-production recording featuring only guitar and drums, that was intended to be edited down.

At the time, Butler had been writing additional complex arrangements, was interested in progressive rock, and appeared in a BBC programme about Pink Floyd. The extended "The Asphalt World" and the experimental ending for "The Wild Ones" were borne out of this affinity.

Osman later expressed he felt Butler's compositions were too experimental: "Lots of the musical ideas were too much. They were being rude to the listener: it was expecting too much of people to listen to them." The arguments over "The Asphalt World" spilled over on to the rest of the album, as Butler became progressively more dissatisfied with Ed Buller's production. In a 2005 interview, the guitarist maintained his position on the matter, stating that Buller "made a terrible shoddy job of it". Butler wanted Buller dismissed, allowing him to produce the record by himself.

It was later revealed that Butler had recommended Chris Thomas as their producer. Thomas was more experienced and had previously worked with punk rock bands The Pretenders and the Sex Pistols; however, Suede's label Nude Records dismissed the idea, saying he was too expensive. Nude's owner Saul Galpern claimed that the guitarist became impossible to reason with, and also made threats to him and Buller. Buller claims he received phone calls where he heard something akin to scratching knives.

Butler issued the band and their management an ultimatum: either they sacked Buller, or he would walk out. The rest of the band refused to comply with Butler's demands, and decided to let him walk out before the record was finished. Butler insisted he was kicked out of the band, for he turned up to the studio one day to find he was not allowed in. He went back the next day to pick up his guitar, and was told through the intercom that his guitar would be left in the street for him (Buller disputes this, stating that the guitars were left at the studio reception desk for collection). Suede's manager Charlie Charlton made a final attempt to reach consensus between the two parties; however, during a tense phone conversation the final words Butler uttered to Anderson were along the lines of "you're a fucking cunt".

Butler left the sessions on 8 July, leaving Dog Man Star some distance from completion. Anderson had recorded little more than a string of guide vocals; several songs did not have titles; much of the music was still to be completed with overdubs. Butler had exited before recording his guitar part for "The Power"; a session guitarist was invited to record the part, replicating Butler's demo recording. Anderson offered to play acoustic guitar.

Buller and the remaining members succeeded in completing the record. Butler did finish some of his guitar parts; however, he refused to do it at Master Rock and instead used another studio where he could work on his own. This is where he made a contractual contribution to "Black or Blue". Anderson discovered a covert backing vocal on the song, which he recalled: "I can't remember the exact words but it sounded vaguely threatening."

As recorded with Butler, "The Wild Ones" originally featured a four-minute extended coda. This was cut from the final version and the ending reworked. Extended mixes of both this and The Asphalt World, restoring cut sections of the original recordings, were eventually released on the 2011 expanded edition.

Butler became a harsh critic of the album's production and overall musicianship. He cites lack of commitment in the studio and the band's unwillingness to embrace his elaborate ideas as his main criticism: "I just heard too many times, 'No, you can't do that'. I was sick to death of it. I think it's a good record, but it could have been much better."

Butler also later criticised the final orchestral arrangement for "Still Life". Osman and Buller share similar views on the final album. Buller described "Still Life" as being "over-the-top"; he said "New Generation" was in the wrong key, and that its drums and mix were "appalling". Osman stated that he regretted the addition of the orchestra on "Still Life" but understood the appeal of it; and he criticised the production of "New Generation", saying the song "suffers from the murkiness of the mix".

== Influences and themes ==
"We were competing with the great records of the past; that's what we had to prove with it. I was trying to write without any boundaries. I was living in a bizarre house in north London, taking lots and lots of hallucinogenic drugs, and writing in a stream of consciousness about anything I wanted and pushing myself as an artist. Dog Man Star is a real testament to what you can create when you want to push yourself as far as you can go."

— Brett Anderson reflecting on Dog Man Star in 2011.

Writing for The New York Times, Neil Strauss said: "Dog Man Star looks back to the era when glam-rock met art rock, with meticulously arranged songs sung with a flamboyance reminiscent of David Bowie and accompanied by anything from a 40-piece orchestra to an old Moog synthesizer." The Bowie influence was still omnipresent, however, unlike their debut, Suede focused on a darker and more melodramatic sound. Some critics compared the record to Diamond Dogs. With many noting "The Power" as the most obvious ode to Bowie. David Byrne of the Irish Independent noted the similarity in the song's outro to Bowie's "Starman". Anderson stated that a lot of the album's sexuality was inspired by Prince. He also drew inspiration from Scott Walker. In his book The Last Party, John Harris opined that the influence of Walker was prevalent throughout the album, highlighting the songs "Still Life" and "Black or Blue". Other influences were Kate Bush's Hounds of Love and Berlin by Lou Reed; which Anderson described as "albums with a musical journey and stories of sadness and darkness." Butler drew inspiration from The Smiths' The Queen is Dead, Joy Division's Closer, Marc and the Mambas' Torment and Toreros and The Righteous Brothers' "You've Lost That Lovin' Feeling".

In retrospect, aside from being a collection of songs, there is a perception among some that the album tells a story; that its structure consists of a beginning, middle and end. One critic opined: "There is a proper introduction, a rousing orchestral finale, and arguably a coherent narrative of love, sex, drugs and loss." Anderson was highly influenced by cinema, and admitted that during his self-imposed exile living in Highgate he watched Performance every night. Critics have noted the album's cinematic influence, with Simon Price writing that Anderson used the city as a "cinematic backdrop to the tragic heroism of his own life." Likewise, on the subject of Suede's familiar lyrical themes, the Radio Times wrote that "He [Anderson] would replace it with something deeper and timeless, drawing on old Hollywood and tragic, quotidian love stories." Critics have likened the album to having an aura of claustrophobia. While Spin gave a figurative description of the record as "the work of a man cautiously opening the bedroom door and reeling from the discovery that other people have lives." Other themes the album explores are solitude, paranoia and self-loathing. On the darker side the album depicts tragedy, failed relationships and doomed romances; however, within this dark setting, Anderson allowed positive statements of ambition and social mobility, reflected in "The Power". As Q's David Sinclair noted, a recurring theme is "the overwhelming desire to escape from the humdrum."

== Music and lyrics ==
Elements of Anderson's lyrics were influenced by his drug use, citing William Blake as a big influence on his writing style. He became fascinated with his use of visions and trance-like states as a means of creation, and claimed that much of the "fragmented imagery" on "Introducing the Band" was the result of letting his subconscious take over. The song was a mantra he wrote after visiting a Buddhist temple in Japan. The uncharacteristic single-chord opening song's style and lyrics baffled critics; some were unimpressed, while Stuart Maconie felt the song had a "cryptic, disclocated [sic?] ambience that makes it an ideal opener". Lewis Carroll was an influence on the lyrics, who Anderson was reading at the time. There was also an Orwellian tone, which permeated into the second song and lead single "We Are the Pigs", which depicts Anderson's visions of Armageddon and riots in the streets. The song also features horns reminiscent of those used in the theme music from Peter Gunn. Anderson's lyrical subjects became exclusively tragic figures, such as the addicted teenager in "Heroine", and James Dean in "Daddy's Speeding".

Both songs, according to Anderson, introduce the themes of isolation where the obsession is forming relationships with fantasy figures, as opposed to real people. "Heroine", with the refrain, I'm aching to see my heroine, has a celebrity influence, paying homage to Marilyn Monroe, while borrowing from Lord Byron. "She Walks in Beauty like the night", the song's opening line, is the first line of a Byron poem. Anderson wrote the eulogy "Daddy's Speeding", about a dream involving taking drugs with the late American actor James Dean. The slow-tempo song culminates with a build-up of feedback and white noise, depicting a car crash. Osman stated that this was an effort to replicate the sound of machinery using guitars. The turbine-like noise at the end, followed by an explosion was done on a Moog synthesizer. The recurring theme of self-loathing is reflected in the ballad "The Wild Ones", which tells of a dying relationship. Anderson considers this song to be his favourite single moment in Suede's history. Pitchfork agreed, saying it "might be Suede's best single, its sweeping orchestration, vocals, and guitar parts coming together in fragile but perfect balance." The main refrain was partly inspired by Jacques Brel's "Ne me quitte pas". Here, Anderson alternates between tenor and falsetto.

"Black or Blue" is a song about racial intolerance and tells the story of a doomed interracial romance. Critics have likened the song to West Side Story. "This Hollywood Life" is one of the few rockers on the album. A standard rock song, it features a guitar riff throughout the verses and a guitar solo. John Harris of NME wrote: "a record so couched in earth-shaking drama probably needs at least one spittle-flecked tantrum." Anderson states that the song is about the "seedier side of the music business," where people are forced to debase themselves somewhat to succeed. "New Generation" is an up-tempo song, considered the most upbeat song on the album and a moment of "sleek rock'n'roll." One writer noted that Anderson sounds more like Bowie in "New Generation" than he did in previous songs that drew similar comparisons. "The Asphalt World" is the longest song on the album and considered its centrepiece. It is a slow-tempo rock ballad partly influenced by Pink Floyd, with one of Butler's longest guitar solos. Its lyrics convey deviancy and sexual jealousy as Anderson revealed the song's lyrics could have been lifted entirely from his own diary. The song uses one of Anderson's familiar lyrical themes of hired/rented cars.

The piano ballad "The 2 of Us", according to Anderson, is about loneliness against the backdrop of wealth and fame; a professional couple incapable of relating to one another emotionally. It features Anderson's favourite lyrics on the album: the snow might fall and write the line on the silent page. A tap dancer was originally heard over the middle eight section. This was removed and replaced with a flute player. Echoing "Sleeping Pills" from Suede, "The 2 of Us" and "Still Life" are considered to be written from the viewpoint of a bored or lonely housewife. An early concept that was originally planned for Suede, "Still Life" features the 40-piece Sinfonia of London orchestra. The song is a tale of someone waiting for their lover to come home, gazing out the window. Anderson also agreed with Buller and Osman that the orchestral coda was over-the-top but defended it saying: "it was conceived very much with the album's journey in mind and as such provided an eloquent end point." Alexis Petridis called it a "suitably overblown finale to an overblown album."

== Title and artwork ==
The back cover of the album featuring the photograph "Lost Dreams".

Anderson spoke of the album's title as a kind of shorthand Darwinism reflecting his own journey from the gutter to the stars. David Bowie biographers Nicholas Pegg and David Buckley posited that the title was a tribute to the musician's 1970s material. Fans, meanwhile, noted the similarity to experimental film-maker Stan Brakhage's 1964 film, Dog Star Man. According to Anderson, the film had no influence on the title. He claims that the three words are featured in almost all the songs in some form. The title is intended as a proud summation of Suede's evolution. "It was meant to be a record about ambition; what could you make yourself into."

An original cover design had been a still from Pasolini's Salò. Eventually, the band settled on a photo lifted from one of Anderson's old photo books, featuring a naked man sprawled on a bed. The photo was taken from a 1972 book called Frontiers Of Photography. Taken by American photographer Joanne Leonard in 1971, the front cover picture was originally titled "Sad Dreams on Cold Mornings" and the rear photo "Lost Dreams". Anderson says, "I just liked the image, really, of the bloke on the bed in the room. It's quite sort of sad and sexual, I think, like the songs on the album."

== Release and promotion ==
Promotion for the album took place in a somewhat lukewarm atmosphere. With the departure of one half of the song-writing partnership, fans and the music press had assumed that the band were finished. Anderson and the remaining members were determined to continue on as normal and conducted press interviews to get the message across that the band were looking for a new guitarist; and that they were staying together, as Suede was the only thing they ever truly believed in. Promotion for the album started one month before its scheduled release with the band conducting interviews with the UK and American music press. The band recruited new guitarist Richard Oakes mid-September after hearing a tape of him playing "My Insatiable One" that he had sent to the band's fanclub. Lead single "We Are the Pigs" was released 12 September peaking at 18 in the UK. The choice of lead single had been a subject of debate, with Sony pressuring Anderson to release "New Generation" first for commercial reasons. He was unwavering on the matter, putting his artistic beliefs ahead of business sense as he felt "We Are the Pigs" had the "drama and power" that represented the album's message. He recalled: "I'd mis-read people's perception of the song. I'd lost my perspective on reality." Bassist Mat Osman felt "The Wild Ones" should have been the first single, and said releasing "We Are the Pigs" was "commercial suicide." The single was performed 22 September on Top of the Pops where Oakes made his first TV performance. The band played three dates in Paris early October, with Oakes making his live debut there before making his official UK debut at a secret fanclub show at Raw Club in London 10 October.

Dog Man Star was released in the UK 10 October 1994 on double gatefold vinyl, MC and CD. It entered the UK Albums Chart at no. 3. However, it slid to no. 12 the following week, and by the end of the year it was outside the top 75. Anderson felt it did not get the commercial momentum he had expected, saying: "I think a lot of people thought the band had split up because Bernard had left." "The Wild Ones" was the second single released 14 November and although more targeted at the mainstream, it also peaked at no. 18. The album was released in the US on Columbia two weeks later 25 October. The album and its singles did not receive the same level of promotion and radio play as the previous album in the US. This was due to the difficult climate surrounding the time of release. Such difficulties were the aforementioned departure of guitarist Bernard Butler; a name change to the London Suede, as a little-known singer from Maryland has had rights to the name Suede in America for fifteen years; and what Billboard magazine described as an "anti-Anglo sentiment" at American modern rock radio. "The Wild Ones" was chosen as the first single in the US going on modern rock radio 4 October. It was also the first single chosen for the European market. The US and Japanese release contained the bonus track "Modern Boys", b-side to "The Wild Ones". The album charted at no. 35 on Billboard's Heatseekers Albums chart 12 November. And also charted on the European Top 100 Albums chart at no. 10. "New Generation" was the last single released from the album charting at no. 21 early 1995.

=== Commercial performance ===
Although the album is often considered a commercial disappointment, its actual UK sales were still relatively strong. By August 1996, it had sold 235,000 copies, without all the hype and media exposure of the debut which sold 275,000. However, at the same time, US sales were only one tenth of UK sales, shifting 23,000. According to Nielsen SoundScan, as of September 2008, it has sold 36,000. By comparison, this is about a third of the sales of Suede. It was certified as gold by the British Phonographic Industry November 1994.

=== Reissues ===
In June 2011, a remastered and expanded edition of Dog Man Star was released along with Suede's first five albums. Additional bonus material includes demos, the b-sides to the singles "Stay Together", "We Are the Pigs" and "The Wild Ones". Also included are six extra tracks; notable releases include the original versions of "The Wild Ones" and "The Asphalt World", and "La Puissance", a version of "The Power" sung in French. The b-sides to "New Generation" were not included as these were recorded in later sessions with new guitarist Richard Oakes.

The DVD features song-films which were specially created for the Dog Man Star tour and previously-unseen footage of the band playing at the Casino de Paris and at the Fnac, Les Halles in Paris on 27 November 1993. The bonus DVD material features a 2011 interview with Anderson and Butler including contemporary film inserts from Simon Gilbert. The booklet contains all the lyrics, hand-written lyric drafts and previously unpublished photos of the band. There is also a specially-written note by Anderson; in it he says: "If I could choose to be remembered for just one musical document it would be this." The reissue charted at no. 63 in the UK Albums Chart.

For the album's 20th anniversary, a limited edition box set was released in October 2014. The special edition included High Fidelity Pure Audio Blu-ray of the album and b-sides; 2 CDs in mini gatefold sleeve and a cassette of entire album with the original 1994 inlay; DVD footage and previously unseen video interviews with the band from July 2013; 1994 performances from Top of the Pops and The O-Zone, Dog Man Star tour films and the "Stay Together" promo video; vinyl 12″ singles of "We Are the Pigs" and "The Wild Ones" and a 7" reproduction of the NME flexi disc in original picture sleeve; 60 page hardback book with notes by Brett Anderson, photos, handwritten lyrics and ephemera; a 48-page sheet music book with five songs; plastic carrier bag with an exclusive design; an A2 poster and a 12″ x 12″ print. There are two versions of the box set packaging artwork. One is identical to the original artwork. The other design, which is the Collector's Limited Edition comes in an alternative colour treatment of an orange tint, which was limited to five hundred units. This version also included a vinyl 12″ "Stay Together" single.

== Critical reception ==
Professional ratings
Review scores
Source	Rating
AllMusic	4.5/5 stars
Chicago Tribune	3/4 stars
Entertainment Weekly	B
The Guardian	4/5 stars
The Irish Times	4/5 stars
NME	9/10
Pitchfork	8.9/10
Q	5/5 stars
The Rolling Stone Album Guide	3.5/5 stars
Select	4/5

Writing in 2011, Brian Boyd of The Irish Times spoke of how the record drew "mass confusion" among critics, with words such as overblown and pompous in many reviews. In the UK, while some admitted it was not without its flaws, critics unanimously spoke favourably of the record's experimental arrangements. John Harris of NME called it "a startling record: an album surrounded by the white heat of something close to genius." He added: "the songs of Dog Man Star are grand designs, enacted against grandiose backdrops." David Sinclair of Q magazine wrote: "With Dog Man Star the group has vindicated just about every claim that was ever made on their behalf. A long, sprawling and not entirely flawless album, it will be hailed in years to come as the crowning achievement of a line-up that reinvented English, guitar-band rock'n'roll for the 1990s." Nicholas Barber of The Independent called it a "blend of pop hooks and theatrical gestures.” He added: "At times Dog Man Star is messy and preposterous. But no record collection is complete without it." Stuart Maconie of Select called it a "great record; at least as good as their debut and probably better when viewed through the reversed telescope of history." David Cavanagh of Mojo praised the record, with particular praise for the last two songs; calling it a collection of "exquisite piano songs and swash-buckling rock numbers... before climaxing with probably the best 15 minutes of any record this year." Outside the London press, Ireland's Hot Press, the Irish Independent, and Scotland's List magazine published positive reviews.

In the US, Suede never matched the moderate success of their first album. This was principally due to the mix-up over the band's name and because Dog Man Star "was one of the most pretentious albums ever released by a major label," according to music journalist Rob Sheffield. In contrast to the positive reception at home, the album had a mixed reception in the US, with many comparing it unfavourably to their first album. Mark Jenkins of The Washington Post felt that the band had fashioned the record for the rock-opera house; with "bombastic" lyrics and "grandiose" musical settings. He wrote: "its ostentatious arrangements merely disguise the lack of hooks that distinguished the band's earlier music." Likewise, Entertainment Weekly were less enthused. Chuck Eddy said: "on ornate gothic ballads, the band that used to be Suede comes off affected and dull." Steve Hochman of the Los Angeles Times expressed similar views, saying: "Suede's 1993 debut held promise, but this one looks backward instead of forward."

However, on the contrary some viewed the album as a step forward with the band breaking out of its comfort zone. Simon Reynolds of The New York Times felt that the band "soars to new heights of swoony hysteria," in contrast to the glam rock showcased on the first album. He added: "Dog Man Star deserves attention, if only for its absurd ambition." Echoing feelings of pushing boundaries, Jonathan Bernstein of Spin concluded his positive review stating: "this is a group capable of far surpassing its perceived limitations." Barry Walters of The Advocate called it “an ambitious beast of an album;” and recognised the polarised opinion it may generate, saying: “For some Dog Man Star will be simply too intense. For others this will be rock album of the year.” Dog Man Star featured in many end-of-year lists with Spin, Vox, NME, Rockdelux and Select including it in their top ten.

== Legacy and influence ==
The album featured in best-of lists throughout the 1990s and 2000s. Critics would designate it as a masterpiece into the new century, although it was somewhat overlooked around the time of release, and in the years that followed; NME said it was "stealthily erased from history."

In September 2003, shortly before Suede disbanded, the album featured in Stylus Magazine's 'On Second Thought' feature, which takes a fresh look at unjustly ignored or misunderstood albums. Jon Monks wrote, "Suede will never make a record this good again, whether it is because Butler left or merely it was a such a perfect time for Brett to be writing, they have failed to make anything nearly so encompassing as this." In a 2006 retrospective review, Michael Furman of Tiny Mix Tapes compared Suede to Radiohead, Oasis and Manic Street Preachers – all of whom issued popular records around this time – and wrote: "It is Suede's Dog Man Star, however, that often slips through the recollections of this period." Similarly, in 2008, Jason Parkes wrote in Head Heritage: "Dog Man Star remains an interesting record and quite odd and too rich for the mainstream at the time."

When Suede reunited in 2010, American magazine Crawdaddy! reappraised the album, saying: "Despite the challenges Suede faced, Anderson achieved the anti-Britpop album he wanted in Dog Man Star, to the kudos of the hipper critical circle, and the detriment of the band's mainstream appeal. For all its indulgence and Bowie-esque melodrama, it's more literate, more tortured, and more ambitious than its peers. More substantive than a "woo-hoo", brighter than any champagne supernova, Dog Man Star's origins, theatrics, and sense of rebellion are the stuff of rock'n'roll legend."

With the release of the band's sixth album Bloodsports in March 2013, Dog Man Star became a talking point among critics and garnered more retrospective attention. In 2013, NME placed the album at number 31 in its list of the 500 greatest albums of all time. In 2014, Mike Diver of Clash singled it out as a key record of the Britpop era: "Listening today, the record feels as weighty as it did at the time, its production carefully pointing distress through the noise, setting beauty against the bleak." Matthew Lindsay of The Quietus contended that Dog Man Star anticipated the prominence of ambitious British rock with dark and lonely themes in the years that followed, citing bands like Pulp, Radiohead and Spiritualized.

The album has been cited as an influence on British indie rock. Bloc Party frontman Kele Okereke said it was "the first record I fell in love with. It made me aware of the power of music." Dog Man Star was the first album Okereke bought. "I got it on tape when I was 12," he recalled. "I wanted to take it back after a week, but found myself listening to it obsessively. I was hearing new things in it every time I played it."

Dougie Payne of Scottish band Travis included the album among his nine favourites: "As far as I'm concerned, the Britpop wars were won by Suede and Pulp. They were the most interesting and adventurous people in the movement. Suede had a depth that the things that followed didn't have. Dog Man Star is a band chucking absolutely everything at a record and it's superb!"

The late Greg Gilbert of English band Delays spoke of his admiration for the record in 2004, describing how the band wrote music having grown up in Southampton: "I'm a big fan of Dog Man Star. It's such a fantastic statement. It's very English, that element is part of where we're coming from, looking for that romance and drama, because Southampton is home but it's a very normal place."

In September 2003, Suede played five nights at London's Institute of Contemporary Arts, dedicating each night to one of their five albums and playing through an entire album a night. Tickets sold fastest for Tuesday's Dog Man Star night, and were selling for over a £1,000 a pair on eBay. By comparison, tickets for A New Morning went for up to £100. In March 2014, Suede made their second appearance at the Royal Albert Hall in aid of the Teenage Cancer Trust's annual series of gigs. The band performed Dog Man Star in its entirety to mark the album's 20th anniversary.

=== Accolades ===
Publication	Country	Accolade	Year	Rank
Alternative Press	US	The 90 Greatest Albums of the 90's	1998	37
Robert Dimery	UK	1001 Albums You Must Hear Before You Die	2005	*
The Guardian	UK	1000 Albums to Hear Before You Die	2007	*
Guitar World	US	Superunknown: 50 Iconic Albums That Defined 1994	2014	*
Colin Larkin	UK	All Time Top 1000 Albums	1998	62
Melody Maker	UK	All Time Top 100 Albums	2000	16
Metro Weekly	US	50 Best Alternative Albums of the '90s	2014	17
NME	UK	100 Best Albums	2003	78
NME	UK	The 100 Greatest British Albums Ever	2006	58
NME	UK	The 500 Greatest Albums of All Time	2013	31
Pitchfork	US	The 50 Best Britpop Albums	2017	5
Q	UK	In Our Lifetime: Q's 100 Best Albums	1995	*
Q	UK	Readers' All Time Top 100 Albums	1998	35
Q	UK	250 Best Albums of Q's Lifetime	2011	81
Rockdelux	Spain	150 Best Albums from the 90s	2000	67
Select	UK	The 100 Best Albums of the 90's	1996	17

(*) designates unordered lists.

== Track listing ==
All tracks are written by Brett Anderson and Bernard Butler.

No.	Title	Length
1.	"Introducing the Band"	2:38
2.	"We Are the Pigs"	4:19
3.	"Heroine"	3:22
4.	"The Wild Ones"	4:50
5.	"Daddy's Speeding"	5:22
6.	"The Power"	4:31
7.	"New Generation"	4:37
8.	"This Hollywood Life"	3:50
9.	"The 2 of Us"	5:45
10.	"Black or Blue"	3:48
11.	"The Asphalt World"	9:25
12.	"Still Life"	5:23
Total length:		57:50

=== 2011 remastered and expanded version ===
Disc One: Demos
No.	Title	Length
13.	"Squidgy Bun (Introducing The Band)" (Four Track Demo)	2:37
14.	"Ken (The Wild Ones)" (Four Track Demo)	5:40
15.	"A Man's Song (Heroine)" (Four Track Demo)	2:55
16.	"Banana Youth (The Power)" (Four Track Demo)	4:02
17.	"The 2 Of Us" (Four Track Demo)	6:40

Disc Two: The B-Sides (And An A-Side)
No.	Title	Length
1.	"My Dark Star"	4:27
2.	"The Living Dead"	2:55
3.	"Stay Together" (Long Version)	7:26
4.	"Killing Of A Flash Boy"	4:07
5.	"Whipsnade"	4:21
6.	"This World Needs A Father"	3:55
7.	"Modern Boys"	4:09
8.	"Eno's Introducing The Band"	16:05

Extra tracks
No.	Title	Length
9.	"La Puissance (The Power)"	1:24
10.	"The Living Dead" (Piano Version)	2:47
11.	"We Believe In Showbiz" (Previously Unreleased)	3:47
12.	"Still Life" (Orchestral Version)	5:15
13.	"The Wild Ones" (Original Unedited Version)	7:17
14.	"The Asphalt World" (Original Unedited Version)	11:27

== Personnel ==
Suede

- Brett Anderson – vocals
- Bernard Butler – guitars, piano, additional instrumentation (credited as "things")
- Simon Gilbert – drums
- Mat Osman – bass guitar

Production

- Ed Buller – production, engineering
- Gary Stout – engineering
- Tracii Sherman – assistance
- Bob Ludwig – mastering

Additional musicians

- Phil Overhead – percussion
- Simon Clarke – trumpet
- Roddy Lorimer – saxophone, flute
- Richard Edwards – trombone
- Andrew Cronshaw – cimbalon, ba-wu flute
- Tessa Niles – additional vocals
- Sinfonia of London – orchestra
  - Brian Gascoigne – arrangements, conducting
- The Tricycle Theatre Workshop – children vocals

Design

- Brett Anderson – sleeve concept, art direction
- Brian Cannon – sleeve design
- Karen Davies – sleeve co-ordination
- Joanne Leonard – sleeve photography
- Jo Spence and Terry Dennett – additional photography
- Karlheinz Poll – additional photography
- David Loehr – additional photography
- Philip Jones Griffiths – additional photography
- Della Grace – additional photography
- Christian Vogt – additional photography

== Charts ==
Chart performance for Dog Man Star
Chart (1994)	Peak position
Australian Albums (ARIA)	73
European Top 100 Albums	10
The Official Finnish Charts	14
French Albums Chart	32
Japanese Albums Chart	39
Swedish Albums Chart	5
UK Albums Chart	3
US Heatseekers Albums Chart	35

== Certifications ==
Certifications for Dog Man Star
Region	Certification	Certified units/sales
United Kingdom (BPI)	Gold	100,000^{^}
^{^} Shipments figures based on certification alone.

== See also ==
- People Move On – the 1998 debut solo album by Butler
