= Attitude (Suede song) =

2003 single by Suede

Single by Suede

from the album Singles
- Released: 6 October 2003
- Length: 3:06
- Label: Columbia
- Songwriters: Brett Anderson, Mat Osman
- Producers: Suede, Jim Abbiss, Ed Buller, Michael Ade

Suede singles chronology
"Obsessions" (2002)	"Attitude" / "Golden Gun" (2003)	"It Starts and Ends with You" (2013)

"Attitude" is a song by Suede, released on 6 October 2003 through Columbia Records. It would be the group's final single before disbanding in late 2003. "Attitude" peaked at number 14 on the UK Singles Chart as a double A-side with "Golden Gun", becoming the group's highest-charting single since "She's in Fashion" in 1999. It also reached the top 20 in Denmark and Spain and peaked at number 50 in Ireland. Some critics viewed the single as an improvement from the group's 2002 album A New Morning. It was announced that a new album was to follow, but this was cancelled when the band announced their break-up only weeks after the single’s release.

== Critical reception ==
The song was better received than the previous year’s singles from A New Morning. John Murphy of musicOMH wrote that "'Attitude' is one of their best tunes for years. A colder, more electronic sound has worked wonders and Brett Anderson's voice is as unmistakeable as ever as he warbles lyrics about a 'dangerous doctor in a leopard print skirt'. The truly nagging chorus haunts you for hours afterwards too." Simon Donohue of the Manchester Evening News contrasted the song with the band's popular "sing-a-long" singles "Beautiful Ones" and "Animal Nitrate", writing: "This on the other hand is vaguely experimental and almost retro in its approach. But as ever, Anderson's dulcet tones are unmistakable." Chris Heath of Dotmusic rated the song seven out of ten, saying: "the staccato bass-heavy rumblings - which might have found a slot on Coming Up - are far preferable to some of the band's weaker moments. Worth enjoying if only for the fact that you don't have to suffer the usual sub-standard album dressed around it." On the other hand, Phil Udell of Hot Press was less enthused, writing: "Those that had Suede down as a mere flash in the pan have been proven wrong, but 'Attitude' does nothing to add to the canon."

== Music videos ==
Two versions of a video were made for "Attitude", directed by Lindy Heymann. The first edit contains no footage of Suede, but instead features actor John Hurt performing the song to an empty amphitheater in drag. The second cut features additional scenes of singer Brett Anderson watching Hurt from the back of the darkened theatre. "Golden Gun" is used as the theme tune for Channel 4's comedy panel show You Have Been Watching, presented by Charlie Brooker.

== Track listings ==
CD1
No.	Title	Writer(s)	Length
1.	"Attitude"	Brett Anderson, Mat Osman	3:06
2.	"Golden Gun"	Anderson, Osman	3:07
3.	"Oxygen"	Anderson, Richard Oakes	4:05
4.	"Attitude" (Video)	Anderson, Osman	3:06

CD2
No.	Title	Writer(s)	Length
1.	"Attitude" (Demo)	Anderson, Osman	3:06
2.	"Just a Girl"	Anderson	2:42
3.	"Heroin"	Anderson	2:54

DVD
No.	Title	Writer(s)	Length
1.	"Attitude" (video)	Anderson, Osman
2.	"We're So Disco"	Anderson
3.	"Head Music" (Arthur Baker Remix)	Anderson

== Charts ==
Chart (2003)	Peak position
Denmark (Tracklisten)	16
Ireland (IRMA)	50
Scotland Singles (OCC) with "Golden Gun"	27
Spain (PROMUSICAE)	18
UK Singles (OCC) with "Golden Gun"	14
