= Suede (band) =

English rock band

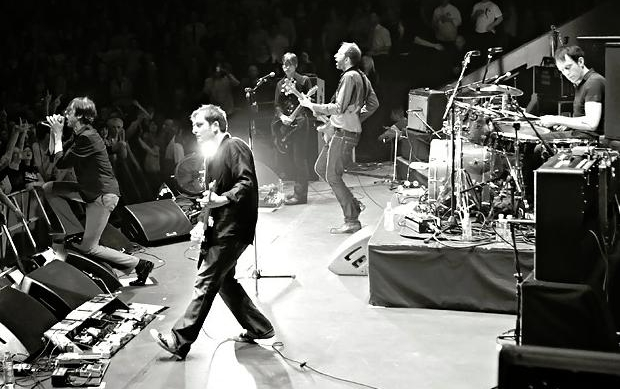
- Suede performing at the Royal Albert Hall, March 2010; From left to right: Brett Anderson, Richard Oakes, Neil Codling, Mat Osman and Simon Gilbert.

Background information
- Also known as: The Perfect (early); The London Suede (US)
- Origin: London, England
- Genres: Britpop; alternative rock; glam rock; art rock
- Works: Suede discography
- Years active: 1989–2003; 2010–present
- Labels: Nude; Columbia; Warner Music; BMG
- Spinoffs: Elastica; The Tears
- Members: Brett Anderson; Mat Osman; Simon Gilbert; Richard Oakes; Neil Codling
- Past members: Justine Frischmann; Justin Welch; Bernard Butler; Alex Lee
- Website: suede.co.uk

Suede (known as the London Suede in the United States) are an English rock band formed in London in 1989 by singer Brett Anderson, guitarist Justine Frischmann, and bassist Mat Osman. Drawing from glam rock and post-punk, Suede were labeled "The Best New Band in Britain" by Melody Maker in 1992, attracting significant attention from the British music press. The following year, their debut album, Suede, reached number one on the UK Albums Chart, becoming the fastest-selling debut album in nearly a decade. It won the Mercury Music Prize and helped propel Britpop as a musical era, though the band distanced themselves from the label.

The recording sessions for their second album, Dog Man Star, were tumultuous, ending with guitarist and songwriter Bernard Butler leaving after conflicts with the other members. Guitarist and songwriter Richard Oakes replaced him and joined the band just before the accompanying tour. Though a commercial disappointment at the time, the album received generally enthusiastic reviews upon release and has since been celebrated as one of rock music's great albums. In 1994, Suede became part of Britpop's "big four," alongside Oasis, Blur, and Pulp.

In 1996, following the addition of keyboardist Neil Codling, Suede achieved greater commercial success with Coming Up. The album reached number one in the UK, produced five top ten singles, and became Suede's best-selling album worldwide. Despite internal issues, Suede's fourth album, Head Music (1999), topped the British charts. Heavily promoted, the album received substantial media attention upon release; however, fan and critical responses were less enthusiastic than for previous records. Codling left the band in 2001, citing chronic fatigue syndrome, and was replaced by Alex Lee. The band's fifth album, A New Morning (2002), their first after the collapse of Nude Records, was a commercial and critical disappointment, leading to the band's disbandment the following year. In 2004, Anderson briefly reunited with Butler to form The Tears before beginning a solo career two years later.

After much speculation, Suede reunited in 2010 for a series of concerts. Three years after their reunion performances, Suede released their sixth album, Bloodsports. It was well received by critics and returned the band to the UK top ten. Their seventh album, Night Thoughts, followed in 2016, achieving even greater critical and commercial success than its predecessor. Their eighth studio album, The Blue Hour, was released in September 2018, becoming the group's first top-five record since Head Music. Their ninth studio album, Autofiction, was released in September 2022. They released their tenth studio album Antidepressants in September 2025.

== History ==
=== 1989–1991: Formation and early years ===
Brett Anderson and Justine Frischmann met in 1988 while studying at University College London and became a couple soon afterward. the original name for their group was The Perfect. Together with Anderson's childhood friend Mat Osman, they believed they had the foundation for a band and spent hours daily playing songs by Roxy Music, The Smiths, David Bowie, and The Cure. After concluding that neither Anderson nor Frischmann had the skills to be a lead guitarist, the band placed an ad in NME in the magazine's 28 October 1989 issue seeking to fill the position: "Young guitar player needed by London-based band. Smiths, Commotions, Bowie, Pet Shop Boys. No Musos. Some things are more important than ability. Call Brett." The ad attracted nineteen-year-old Bernard Butler, who soon auditioned to join the band. With the addition of Butler they changed their name to Suede. Initially lacking a drummer, the band used a drum machine. Despite Frischmann's efforts as the band's de facto manager, they primarily played small-scale gigs around Camden Town in London.

Suede's first breakthrough came with their second demo, Specially Suede, which they sent to compete in Demo Clash, a radio show on Greater London Radio hosted by DJ Gary Crowley. "Wonderful Sometimes" won Demo Clash for five consecutive Sundays in 1990, leading to a recording contract with the Brighton-based indie label RML. The song appeared on a cassette compilation in April 1990, representing Suede's first official release. After a series of performances with an unreliable drum machine, Suede decided to recruit a full-time drummer. Justin Welch briefly filled the role, though he lasted only six weeks before joining the Crawley band Spitfire. However, he remained long enough to record two songs with the band, which were set to be released as the "Be My God"/"Art" single on RML Records. The band was dissatisfied with the result, and most of the 500 copies pressed were destroyed. Suede placed another ad seeking a replacement. To their surprise, it was answered by former Smiths drummer Mike Joyce. Ultimately, he declined the job, feeling Suede still needed to forge their own identity and that his presence might hinder them due to their similarities to the Smiths. In June 1990, Suede found a permanent drummer, Simon Gilbert, through Ricky Gervais, who initially worked in the music industry and managed the band before turning to comedy. Both worked at the University of London Union (ULU). After hearing the demo and realizing the band lacked a drummer, Gilbert asked to audition.

By spring 1991, Anderson and Frischmann had broken up. Frischmann began dating Blur frontman Damon Albarn. She believed the band could adapt to the new situation. However, tensions grew. Butler recalled, "She'd turn up late for rehearsals and say the worst thing in the world – 'I've been on a Blur video shoot.' That was when it ended, really. I think it was the day after she said that Brett phoned me up and said, 'I've kicked her out.'" After Frischmann's departure, the character of the group shifted. "If Justine hadn't left the band," Anderson remarked, "I don't think we'd have got anywhere. It was a combination of being personally motivated and the chemistry being right once she'd left." Anderson and Butler became close friends and started writing several new songs together. Still, the band's music remained out of step with the prevailing sounds of London's music scene and the American grunge movement. Anderson noted, "For the whole of 1991, A&R men wouldn't give us a second look."

Through late 1991 and early 1992, Suede received a number of favorable mentions in the music press, landing slots at shows hosted by NME and attended by prominent figures, including former Smiths singer Morrissey. A gig at the ULU in October 1991, which caught the media's attention, marked Frischmann's final performance with the band. NME journalist John Mulvey, the first to write about Suede, attended the show. He noted, "They had charm, aggression, and... if not exactly eroticism, then something a little bit dangerous and exciting."

=== 1992–1993: Signing and early success ===
After seeing the band perform at an NME show in January 1992, Saul Galpern approached them about signing to his independent record label, Nude Records. Suede eventually signed a two-single deal with Nude in February 1992 for £3,132. Following Nude's offer, Suede attracted further interest from Island Records and East West Records, both of which were eager to sign the band for a long-term deal. Suede were being hailed as "the next big thing" and, prior to the release of their first single, Melody Maker featured the band on the cover of its 25 April issue with the headline "Suede: The Best New Band in Britain". The band's first single, "The Drowners", attracted attention for its sharp contrast to the fading Madchester scene and the US grunge sound of the time. A moderate hit, "The Drowners" reached number 49 on the UK Singles Chart in May. The band was then approached by Geffen Records, and although the Geffen deal was very attractive (Galpern described it as "insane"), the band still had other offers to consider. In September 1992, Suede released their second single, "Metal Mickey", which reached number 17 on the charts. It was the only Suede single to enter the US Modern Rock top 10, peaking at number 7. Shortly after the release of "Metal Mickey," Suede signed with Nude/Sony. Galpern was determined to sign the band for the long term and struck a deal with Sony, making the label a small independent with major company backing. The contract gave Suede creative control over aspects such as the artwork for their releases.

Anderson soon became notorious for causing controversy, such as his infamous quote that resurfaced in interviews and articles in subsequent years: he was "a bisexual man who never had a homosexual experience." In February 1993, Suede transitioned from a highly touted indie band to major chart contenders with their third single, "Animal Nitrate," which entered the UK top ten. The single earned them a last-minute invitation to perform at that year's Brit Awards ceremony. Writing in 2005, The Times' Victoria Segal reflected on the band's early career, noting that Suede's "sexually fluid lyrics made them a rallying point for the alienated, one of the few British bands since the Smiths who united as much as they divided." Comparisons were drawn to David Bowie, though Suede's sound was unlike anything else at the time, and they soon became associated with a new movement that critics quickly labeled. Anderson recalled, "I had always been fascinated by suburbia, and I liked to throw these twisted references to small-town British life into songs. This was before we had that horrible term Britpop."

Before Suede had released an album, they dominated the music press on the strength of just three singles, setting high expectations for the forthcoming album. Suede entered the British charts at number one, registering the biggest initial sales for a debut album since Frankie Goes to Hollywood's Welcome to the Pleasuredome a decade earlier. It sold over 100,000 copies in its first week of release, going gold on its second day. At the time, it was hailed as "the most eagerly awaited debut since Never Mind The Bollocks by the Sex Pistols." A notable moment in the press at the time was the front cover of the April 1993 issue of Select, which is regarded by many as the start of Britpop. The album won the 1993 Mercury Prize. The band donated the entire £25,000 in prize money to Cancer Research. This was the only album released in the US under the name "Suede," where it remains the band's highest-selling release.

Following the success of the album, the band toured extensively across Europe, receiving major coverage from MTV. In July, Suede held a benefit concert for the Red Hot Organization at "The Grand" in London, inviting Siouxsie Sioux to perform a version of Lou Reed's "Caroline Says" with Butler. Suede then prepared for an American tour in the summer of 1993. During the tour, tensions began to develop between Butler and the rest of the band. Tensions peaked on the first American tour in Los Angeles, when Butler disappeared during a soundcheck. The gig proceeded, but for the remainder of the tour, the two parties barely spoke. The tensions worsened on the second American tour, largely due to the death of Butler's father, which forced Suede to cancel the tour prematurely. Butler was dissatisfied with the band's indulgence during his bereavement, leading to his alienation from the group. He even traveled separately from them. Suede's American success was limited, as they had already begun to be overshadowed by their opening act, The Cranberries, who received the MTV support that Suede lacked. On several occasions, Butler left the stage during Suede's performances and persuaded a member of The Cranberries to fill in for him. Furthermore, a lounge singer's lawsuit forced the band to stop using the trademarked American name "Suede." For subsequent releases and shows in the United States, the band used the name "The London Suede." Anderson was not pleased about having to change the band's name for the U.S. market, stating, "The London Suede is not the name I chose for the band, I didn't change it happily, and I'm not going to pretend I did."

=== 1994–1995: Butler's exit and Dog Man Star ===
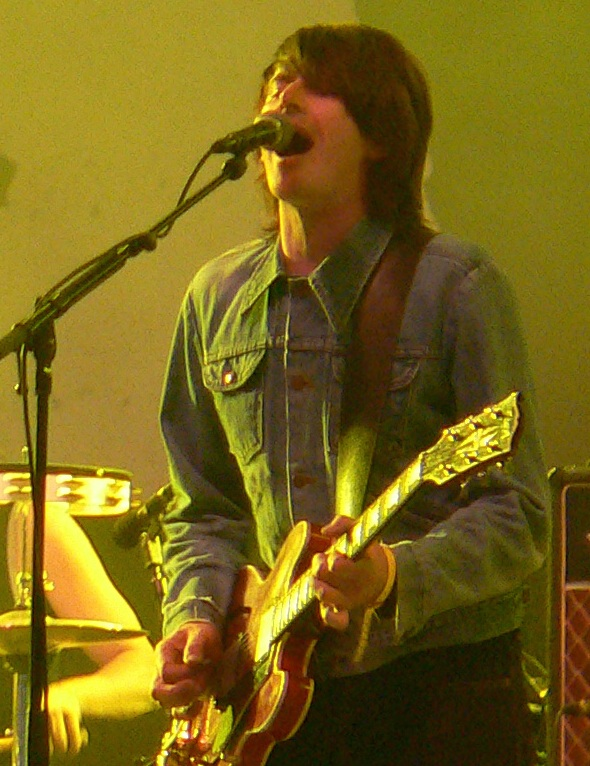
Bernard Butler (shown here during a live performance with the Tears in 2005), left Suede in 1994 due to growing tensions between him and lead vocalist Brett Anderson, with whom he finally made amends in 2003

In February 1994, the band released the stand-alone single "Stay Together", which became their highest-charting single at the time, reaching number three in the UK. The single was backed by a collection of strong B-sides. However, the new expansive sound fractured the band and led to the departure of Butler. Despite the success of the single, the band has since distanced itself entirely from the song, an aversion usually attributed to issues with Butler at the time. In the aftermath of "Stay Together," Anderson isolated himself in a house in Highgate and began writing songs for Suede's next album. It was during this time that Anderson distanced himself from what was dubbed the "laddish Britpop movement", even as he was considered one of it leading figures. Bands such as Blur, Oasis, and Pulp began to dominate the music scene, while Suede became more experimental and introverted. Tensions worsened during the recording of the album when Butler criticized Anderson in a rare interview, claiming that Anderson worked too slowly and was too concerned with rock stardom. Of Anderson, he said, "He's not a musician at all. It's very difficult for him to get around anything that isn't ABC."

Around this time, journalist Neil Strauss wrote that Suede were a band "unafraid to be out of step with its peers." The band began recording excessively lengthy songs at the behest of Butler. Osman stated that he, Anderson, and Gilbert often felt these tracks were the result of Butler trying to provoke them. Anderson recalled that Butler had largely recorded his parts separately from the rest of the band. This was usually done in shifts, with Anderson coming to the studio in the evenings after Butler had recorded his guitar parts during the day. Tensions reached a breaking point when Butler clashed with the producer Ed Buller, who he insisted should be fired, as he wanted to produce the record himself. Butler then gave Anderson an ultimatum, demanding that the producer be fired or he would leave. "I called his bluff," said Anderson. Days after his wedding, Butler returned to the studio to find he was not being allowed in, and his guitars were left out on the street. According to John Harris's Britpop history, The Last Party, the last words Butler uttered to Anderson were "you're a fucking cunt." Butler left the band with a quarter of the recording still to be completed. In the band's first interview as a three-piece, Anderson had foreseen the scenario, telling NME's Steve Sutherland: "I saw it coming two years ago. It was no shock, I don't think he ever really wanted to be in the band or anything that goes with it."

Led by the single "We Are the Pigs", Suede's second album, Dog Man Star, was released in October 1994. The album was very well received by critics in the UK, who praised the band's new experimental direction. It entered the UK Albums Chart at number three, but quickly slid down the charts. The singles from the album performed poorly. Reviews in the US were more mixed, with some critics comparing it unfavorably to the singles from the first album and several labeling it as pretentious and using other synonyms to that effect. Rolling Stone described it as "one of the most pretentious albums ever released by a major label." Nevertheless, despite not gaining mass exposure at the time, it steadily developed a legacy throughout the decade and beyond as one of rock music's great albums. In September 1994, Suede announced that 17-year-old Richard Oakes was to be the new guitarist. After reading about Butler's departure, he sent a demo tape to the band's fanclub. When Gilbert heard Anderson playing back the tape while going through audition tapes, he mistakenly believed it to be an early Suede demo. Oakes' first official duty as a member of Suede was an appearance in the "We Are the Pigs" video. He then co-wrote his first music with Suede, the B-sides for the "New Generation" single, "Together" and "Bentswood Boys". Suede embarked on a long international tour during late 1994 and spring 1995, before disappearing to work on their third album. In 1995, the band contributed a track to The Help Album charity compilation, covering Elvis Costello's "Shipbuilding".

=== 1996–2000: New line up and continuing success ===
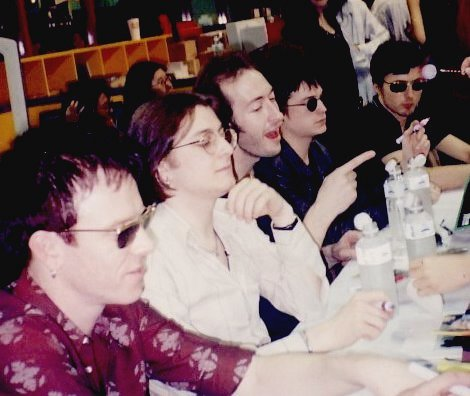
Suede in Thailand, 1997. Left to right: Simon Gilbert, Richard Oakes, Mat Osman, Neil Codling, and Brett Anderson

In the autumn of 1995, the band was joined by new member Neil Codling, a cousin of Gilbert who played keyboards and second guitar. His first appearance was at a fanclub gig at the Hanover Grand on 27 January 1996, which turned out to be one of Suede's most important performances. A short set, devoid of Butler's songs, was well received by critics. "A set that says, 'No need,'" observed Steve Sutherland in NME. Even before Dog Man Star was released, bassist Mat Osman told Select magazine in September 1994 that he wanted to move on from the regimented recording process and expansive, multi-layered guitar sounds of that era and focus on more radio-friendly pop music, citing "Losing My Religion" by R.E.M. as a song that "doesn't show off in the slightest and is still brilliant." Anderson shared a similar outlook, saying that, in contrast to the band's previous albums, which he felt "suffered at certain times from being quite obscure," he intended the forthcoming album to be "almost like a 'greatest hits.'" Suede's third album, Coming Up, was released in September 1996 and was preceded by the successful lead single, "Trash", in July. The single was popular and tied with "Stay Together" as the band's highest-charting UK single, reaching number three. The album would become the band's biggest mainstream success, earning five straight top-10 singles and becoming a hit throughout Europe, Asia, and Canada. Coming Up never did find a significant audience in America, partly because it appeared nearly a year after its initial release and partly because Suede only supported it with a three-city tour. The tour was further complicated by problems in Boston, Massachusetts, where the band's music equipment was stolen, forcing them to play the remaining shows with acoustic guitars. Nevertheless, the album topped the UK chart and became the band's biggest-selling release, setting expectations high for the follow-up. With the success of the album, Suede secured top billing at the 1997 Reading Festival. Suede's next release was Sci-Fi Lullabies, a collection of B-sides, which reached number nine on the UK Album Chart. The compilation was well-received, with disc one of two being described by critics as the band's strongest collection of songs.

By the time the compilation was released in 1997, the Britpop movement was clearly losing momentum, and the band had chosen to part ways with their longtime producer, Ed Buller, before beginning work on the follow-up to Coming Up. Prior to focusing on their next album, the band recorded a version of "Poor Little Rich Girl" for Twentieth-Century Blues: The Songs of Noël Coward in 1998. Despite being backed by their second-highest-charting single, "Electricity", Suede's fourth album, Head Music, failed to generate the same critical and listener enthusiasm as their previous records, though it once again topped the UK Albums Chart. A synthesizer-driven album that placed less emphasis on guitar riffs and more on keyboards, it was produced by Steve Osborne, who had worked with Happy Mondays and New Order. While the album received heavy promotion and substantial financial backing, and garnered near-universal critical acclaim from the UK music press, the consensus among people close to the band was a feeling that things were not quite right. Richard Oakes was aware of the fans' disapproval of the album, as well as Anderson's more gaunt-like appearance and Oakes' own admission of spending two years "being pissed out [his] face and being out of shape." Moreover, many critics felt the record's lyrics were too shallow and lacking in substance. Though others praised the album, feeling that the band were again taking a different direction and charting new territory.

The next three singles released from the album failed to enter the top 10, breaking a streak that had lasted since the 1996 single "Trash". Anderson also faced increasing criticism from fans for his frequent use of redundant vocabulary and limited lyrical themes. The track that received the most attention and criticism was "Savoir Faire". Some critics linked the album's lyricism to Anderson's heavy drug use at the time, particularly after he later admitted that he "was a crack addict for ages". Speaking of his addiction, which plagued him for two and a half years, Anderson said, "Anyone who has ever tried crack will know exactly why I took it. It's the scariest drug in the world because the hit you get from it is so, so seductive. I wanted to experience that, and I did – repeatedly." Suede headlined the Roskilde and V Festivals in July and August 1999, respectively. During 2000, there was press speculation that Suede were on the verge of disbanding, which was not helped by Codling's absence from some European gigs. Anderson denied these claims and insisted that Codling was healthy and that they were eager to record the next album. For the entirety of 2000, Suede retreated from the public eye, playing only one gig in Reykjavík, Iceland. The band premiered several new songs that would eventually appear on the final album.

=== 2001–2003: Commercial disappointment and break-up ===
Not long after the release of Head Music, Nude Records effectively ceased to exist. Like many of their labelmates, Suede ended up signing to Nude's parent company/distributor Sony to record the band's fifth album, A New Morning. Between the release of Head Music and A New Morning, Suede wrote and recorded "Simon" as the title theme for the film Far From China. The long and troubled gestation of the new album saw keyboard player Codling leave the band, citing chronic fatigue syndrome, to be replaced by Alex Lee, formerly of Strangelove. In concert, Lee played keyboards, second guitar, backing vocals, and occasionally harmonica. The album title, according to Anderson, referred to "a fresh start, a new band, and a new fresh outlook" – the singer had been addicted to heroin and crack cocaine, which was having an increasingly deleterious effect on his health. Anderson claimed that A New Morning "was the first-ever Suede record that wasn't influenced in its making by drugs".

Although the band initially worked with Tony Hoffer as the producer, the album was ultimately produced by Stephen Street (The Smiths, Blur). A total of seven different recording studios and four producers were involved in the two-year recording process for A New Morning, with the costs estimated at £1 million. The album was a commercial disappointment, failing to chart in the top 20 and never being released in the United States. A New Morning sharply divided the band's fanbase, even more so than Head Music, and the critical response was decidedly lukewarm. Additionally, mainstream public interest had long since faded. Only two singles, "Positivity" and "Obsessions", were released—the fewest singles from any of the band's albums—and neither performed particularly well on the charts. Anderson has since expressed his disappointment with the record, stating, "We made one Suede album too many. 'A New Morning' is the only one I don't believe in as much as the other Suede records, and I totally believed in the first four, even 'Head Music', which divided the fans." Mat Osman told journalist Jon Cronshaw in October 2013, "It sounded like a Suede album that had been made by a committee—it was quite bland. We're all quite ashamed of it." Anderson further criticized the album in 2016, saying, "It's a poor record, and we should never have released it."

In September 2003, Suede played five nights at the Institute of Contemporary Arts in London, dedicating each night to one of their five albums and performing an entire album per night in chronological order, with B-sides and rarities as encores. In October 2003, Suede released a second compilation album, Singles, along with the accompanying single "Attitude", which charted at number 14 in the UK. The band had also begun work on a follow-up album to A New Morning, which was planned for release after the Singles compilation. Anderson stated, "Most of the new material is more aggressive and less song-based than A New Morning." He added, "We're spending a lot of time working on tracks that sound nothing like traditional Suede." The planned album was never released.

On 28 October 2003, Anderson made the decision to call it a day. The same day, Suede were booked to perform "Beautiful Ones" on V Graham Norton to promote the Singles compilation. Jeremy Allen was the last person to interview the band just before the Norton appearance. Allen would later see the band again some six weeks later at the aftershow party following their final gig at the London Astoria in December. At the aftershow, Osman revealed to Allen that they had decided to call it quits less than a minute after their last interview. As they walked down the corridor to the studio set, Anderson whispered into Osman's ear, "Let's not do this anymore." Less than a week after the decision to call an end to Suede, the band's biography, Love and Poison, was released on 3 November. On 5 November, the band announced there would be no more projects under the Suede name for the foreseeable future—effectively announcing the end of the band, as stated on their website: "There will not be a new studio album until the band feel that the moment is artistically right to make one." Anderson also made a personal statement, saying, "There has been speculation about record sales and chart positions, but the bottom line is I need to do whatever it takes to get my demon back." Suede's last concert at the London Astoria on 13 December 2003 was a two-and-a-half-hour marathon show, split into two parts plus encore. Anderson made an announcement, saying, "I just want you to know. There will be another Suede record. But not yet."

=== 2010–2013: Reunion and Bloodsports ===
Following persistent rumors, Saul Galpern, the boss of the band's former label, Nude Records, officially announced on 15 January 2010 that Suede would be playing together again. "It's a one-off gig," he explained about the show, which featured the band's second incarnation. The band performed at the Royal Albert Hall in London as part of the 2010 Teenage Cancer Trust shows on 24 March 2010. Anderson described the comeback show as his favorite gig and the pinnacle of his 20-year career. Despite the gig initially being billed as a one-night-only reformation, when questioned on the German radio station MotorFM in early February, Anderson refused to confirm that the band would not continue. The band subsequently announced two UK "warm-up" gigs prior to the Royal Albert Hall show, at the 100 Club in London and The Ritz in Manchester. The three gigs were well received by critics from various newspapers.

In August, the band performed at the Skanderborg Festival in Denmark and Parkenfestivalen in Bodø, Norway. In September, the band announced that they would release The Best of Suede on 1 November 2010. The two-disc compilation, put together by Anderson, featured 18 of the band's 20 singles on disc one and a mix of album tracks and popular B-sides on disc two. Shortly after the release, Suede embarked on a short European tour from late November into December, covering Spain, France, Belgium, Sweden, the Netherlands, and Germany. The band concluded the tour on 7 December at the O2 Arena in London.

After their largest show at the O2 Arena in London, Brett Anderson confirmed that Suede was eager to continue performing in 2011. The band went on to perform at several festivals in 2011, including their first appearance at the SOS 4.8 Festival in Murcia, Spain in May. Other notable events included the Blackberry Live & Rockin' Festival at the Jakarta International Expo in Indonesia in March 2011, and the Coachella Valley Music and Arts Festival in April 2011, marking their first American performance since 1997.

The band also performed at the Latitude Festival in Suffolk on 17 July 2011, with their final performance of the year at the Berlin Festival on 9 September 2011, following their August tour of Asia.

In June 2011, capitalizing on the success of their compilation album, the band released remastered and expanded editions of all five of their studio albums. In May 2011, they performed their first three albums—Suede, Dog Man Star, and Coming Up—in full across three nights at the O2 Brixton Academy in London on 19, 20, and 21 May, followed by similar performances at the Olympia Theatre, Dublin on 24, 25, and 26 May.

Suede also performed at the Lokerse Festival in Belgium in 2012.

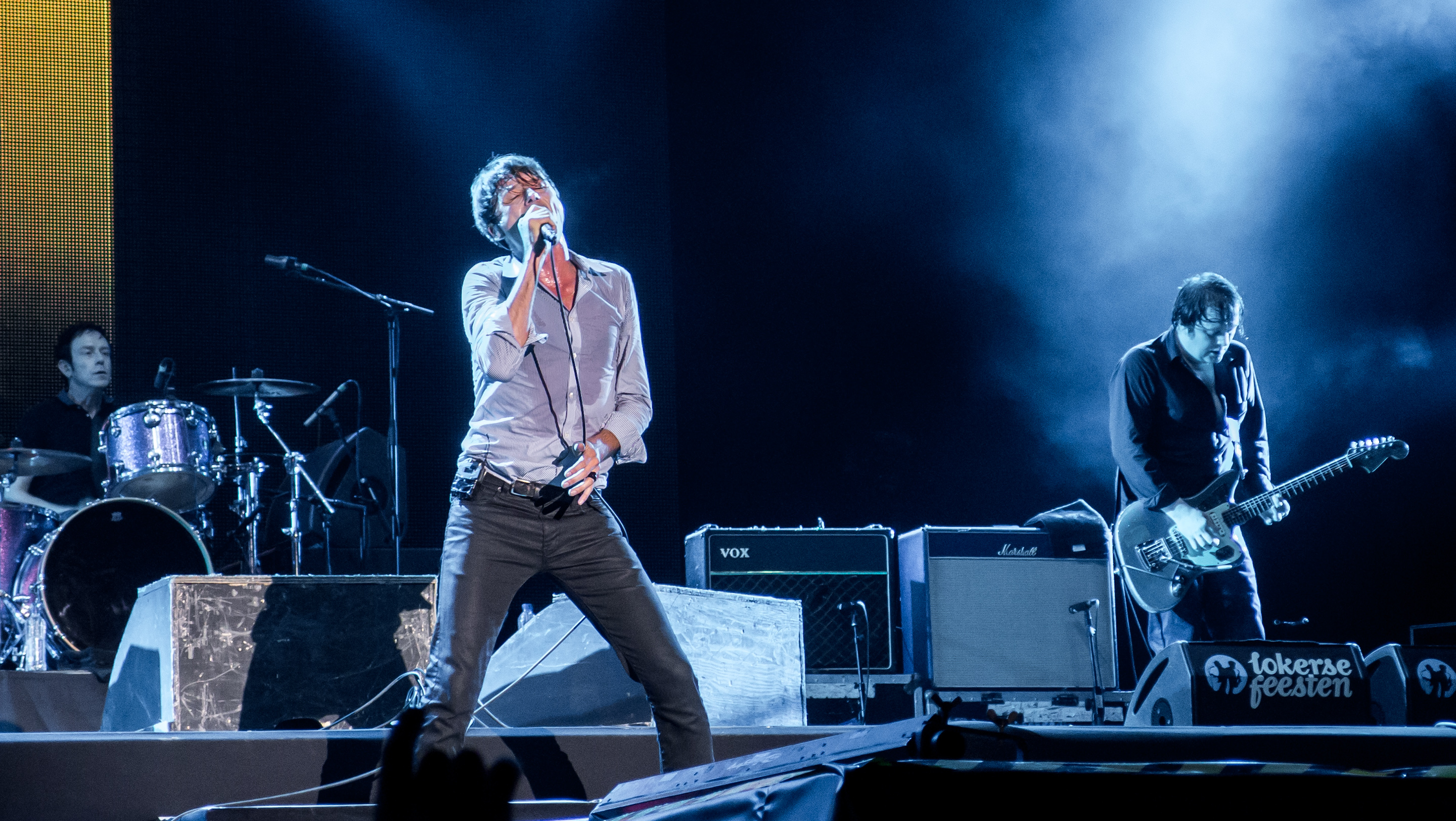
Suede performing at the Lokerse Feesten in Belgium in 2012

Suede embarked on a full Asian tour, which began in late July at the Jisan, South Korea, and concluded at the Summer Sonic festival in Tokyo, Japan, on 14 August 2011. The band performed in Athens on 11 September 2011, and wrapped up their touring commitments in Russia on 16 and 18 December 2011, where they showcased new songs such as "Falling Planes," "The Only," "Someone Better," "I Don't Know Why," "Cold War," "Future Nightmare," and "Sabotage." In 2012, Suede began recording a new album with Ed Buller, and Brett Anderson stated that of the songs showcased in Russia, only "Sabotage" was under consideration at that point. On 7 January 2013, the band announced that their sixth studio album, Bloodsports, would be released in March. The announcement was accompanied by "Barriers," a song from the album, available as a free download. The band released their first single in a decade, "It Starts and Ends with You," on 4 February. Bloodsports was well received by critics and became their best-reviewed album since the band's 1996 album Coming Up. On 12 April, Suede announced the dates for their upcoming European tour on their website. The tour began on 26 October 2013 at the Leeds O2 Academy and ended on 23 November at the Paradiso in Amsterdam. The band later added three more shows at the beginning of the tour, playing additional dates in Southampton, Southend, and Bristol on 22, 23, and 24 October.

=== 2014–2016: Night Thoughts ===
In late January 2014, Anderson announced that Suede were working on a new album and estimated that it would be released in 2015, as the band were still in the writing stage for the album. On 7 September 2015, the band announced that their new album, Night Thoughts, would be released on 22 January 2016, alongside a feature film directed by photographer Roger Sargent. On 24 September, the first single from the album, "Outsiders," was released. The band performed the album in full on 13 and 14 November at the London Roundhouse. The album was released as a standalone CD, as a double pack with the movie on DVD, and as a limited numbered edition featuring the CD, DVD, and a book. Anderson noted that, unlike previous albums, for the first time the band had the freedom to do their own thing. Without the pressure to aim for the mainstream, the band deliberately avoided writing any radio hits. Night Thoughts was well received by both fans and critics, receiving widespread press coverage upon its release. Following the success of Bloodsports, Night Thoughts charted at No. 6 in the UK. A series of concert dates in the UK and Europe followed to support the album. The first half of each show featured the band playing the album tracks in sequence, with the movie projected onto a gauze screen behind them. The second half included a mix of back-catalogue material, including several b-sides and obscure songs. The band also held a number of in-store acoustic appearances in HMV stores to promote the release, including Q&A sessions and movie screenings.

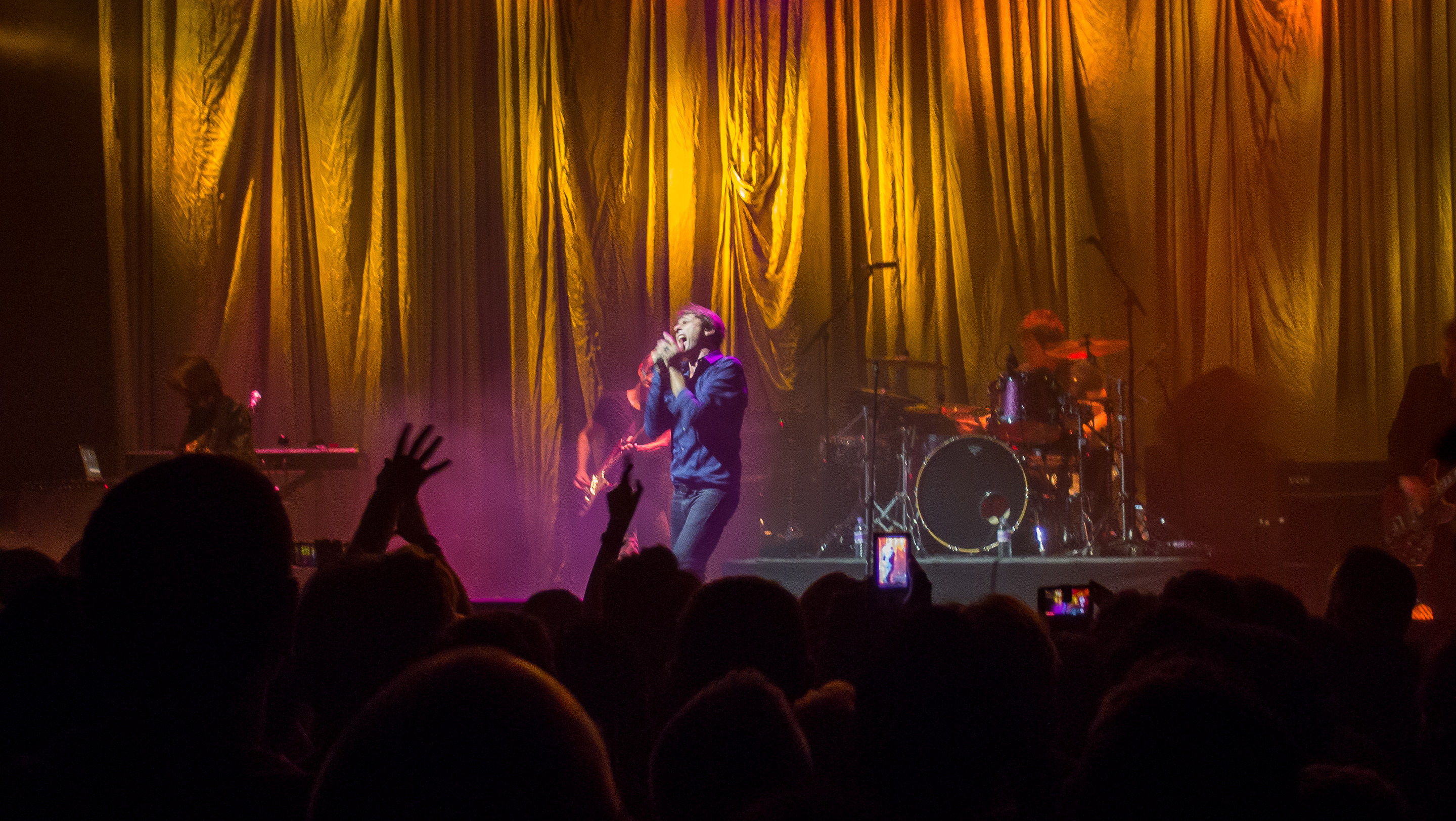
Suede performing at the Roundhouse in London in 2015

During the period when the band wrote and toured Night Thoughts, they also commemorated some of their earlier releases. Once again, the band performed as part of the Teenage Cancer Trust charity at the Royal Albert Hall on 30 March 2014. This time, the band performed Dog Man Star in full to mark its 20th anniversary. The set was followed by b-sides from that era, and then a greatest hits finale, which included the new song "I Don't Know How to Reach You". Additionally, to celebrate the actual 20th anniversary release of the album, Suede released a limited edition box set in October 2014. A similar 20th anniversary reissue was released for Coming Up in September 2016.

=== 2018–2020: The Blue Hour ===
On 28 April 2018, Suede announced their upcoming eighth studio album. Two days later, on 30 April 2018, they officially revealed the title, The Blue Hour, which was released on 21 September 2018. On 4 May 2018, Suede announced the dates for their European tour, which were scheduled to begin shortly after the album's launch. The tour started on 29 September in Berlin, at the Columbiahalle, and finished on 13 October at the Eventim Apollo in London. A final show was added to the tour on 14 October at the Bord Gáis Energy Theatre in Dublin. On 5 June 2018, the band shared the first single from the album, "The Invisibles," along with an accompanying video. Five singles were released from the album, matching the number of singles from Night Thoughts, with the latest single, "Wastelands," released on 29 October. The album was met with generally favorable reception and became their highest-charting album since Head Music in 1999. Suede announced their first 2019 show as Friday night headliners at Pennfest, Penn, Buckinghamshire. In November 2018, the band released a documentary titled Suede – The Insatiable Ones, directed by Mike Christie. The feature-length documentary delves into the highs and lows of Suede's career, offering unprecedented access, new interviews, and unseen footage from the band's archive. It aired as part of a 'Suede Night' on 24 November on Sky Arts, along with the band's 2010 comeback gig at the Royal Albert Hall. On 10 December, the band announced new dates for their 2019 UK tour. The tour began at Newcastle's O2 Academy on 15 April and concluded on 28 April at the Corn Exchange in Cambridge.

=== 2020–2023: Autofiction ===
In November 2020, an announcement on the official Suede Facebook page revealed that the band was currently recording a new album. The post also invited fans to contribute vocals for some as-yet-untitled tracks. In a BBC interview, Anderson suggested that the record would be "nasty, brutish and short." On 9 July 2021, Music Week reported that Suede had signed with the BMG label for the release of their next album, although no release date had been confirmed.

On 23 May 2022, eighteen months after the band first announced they were recording a new album, Suede revealed the title of their ninth studio album as Autofiction, which was released via BMG on 16 September. On the same day, the band unveiled the name of their lead single, "She Still Leads Me On", and premiered it at a concert at the Cirque Royal in Brussels. The song is inspired by Anderson's late mother. Speaking about the new album, Anderson said: "Autofiction is our punk record. No whistles and bells. Just the five of us in a room with all the glitches and fuck-ups revealed; the band themselves exposed in all their primal mess". In an interview with Billboard, Anderson further explained: "Our intention was also to recover certain aesthetic lines in the sound ... [the] post-punk sound is back very strongly in the limelight".

Two additional singles, "15 Again" and "That Boy on the Stage", were released before the album. According to Anderson, the former is "a song about falling in love with life for the first time." The latter, he explained, "[is] about persona. It's about the people we become." On 12 September, the band announced the dates for a March 2023 UK tour. The 2023 tour was scheduled to begin at Bath's Forum on 3 March, concluding at O2 Academy Brixton on 25 March, marking 30 years since the band made their debut performance at the London venue in May 1993. On 13 September, the band announced their first United States concert tour since 1997, a co-headlining North American tour with Manic Street Preachers. Both bands were scheduled to play ten shows in the US and two shows in Canada throughout November. Suede also performed at the 2022 Formula 1 Singapore Grand Prix.

=== 2024–present: Antidepressants ===
In 2024, Suede and the Manic Street Preachers performed a series of double-header concerts in the UK, alternating who performed first. During these gigs, Anderson announced that Suede was working on a new album, with the working title *X*. On 19 May 2025, they announced Antidepressants as the official title for their tenth studio album. The band revealed that they took some inspiration in the post-punk genre once again. Oakes explained: "My teenage influences – Keith Levene [of Public Image Ltd], John McGeoch [of Siouxsie and the Banshees], the Fall, Wire – didn't really have a place in the writing in the early years" but "suddenly I felt it did have a place" in Autofiction and Antidepressants. Preceded by the singles "Disintegrate", "Trance State", and "Dancing with the Europeans", Antidepressants was released on 5 September 2025 through BMG, subsequently reaching number two in the UK Albums Chart. The following year, the album was shortlisted for the Mercury Prize, their third nomination overall after their debut and Coming Up.

== Legacy and influence ==
A significant part of Suede's legacy lies in their role in kickstarting the Britpop scene, which eventually overshadowed the band's own achievements in the public mind. Alexis Petridis wrote in 2005, "These days, rock historians tend to depict Suede's success as a kind of amuse bouche (appetizer) before the earth-shattering arrival of Britpop's main course." In an article about the British music press's "ferocious one-upmanship campaign" of the mid-1990s, Caroline Sullivan, writing for The Guardian in February 1996, noted Suede's appearance on the cover of Melody Maker before the release of their first single as a pivotal moment in the history of Britpop:

Suede appeared on Melody Maker's cover before they had a record out... The exposure got them a record deal, brought a bunch of like-minded acts to the public's attention, and helped create Britpop. It was the best thing to happen to music in years, and it mightn't have happened without that Suede cover.

The year following the Melody Maker cover saw Suede captivate the pop scene with a phenomenon of critical praise and hype. Not since the dawn of the Smiths had a British band caused such excitement with the release of just a few singles. A March 1993 article in The Independent stated, "Suede have had more hype than anybody since the Smiths, or possibly even the Sex Pistols. The reviews are florid, poetic, half-crazed; they express the almost lascivious delight of journalists hungry for something to pin their hopes on." Suede are regarded by many as the first British band to break into the mainstream from the new wave of alternative rock in the '90s. With their glam rock style and musical references to urban Britain, Suede paved the way for acts such as Oasis, Blur, and Pulp to enter the British mainstream. They were influential in returning some of the creative impetus to English guitar music in a scene increasingly dominated by Madchester, grunge, and shoegaze. Even beyond their own shores, American heavy metal personality Eric Greif declared that Suede "reinvented and repackaged glam in a creative way, and how refreshing that was as a counterpoint to the drab grunge of the time."

Suede's laurels would remain intact through their early career until Butler's departure, which the press signaled as the end of the band. As new rock bands emerged on the scene, British pop culture was shifting towards lad culture, and the same critics who had championed Suede were now plotting to extinguish them. In February 1995, music critic J.D. Considine stated that the band "quickly fell victim to the build-'em-up-then-knock-'em-down mentality of the English music press." On the eve of the release of Coming Up, Neil McCormick of The Telegraph wrote: "Cast in the classic mold of the androgynous rock star, Anderson appears curiously anachronistic in a British rock scene polarized between the laddishness of Oasis and the suburbiana of Blur and Pulp." In a 2007 article in The Telegraph, Bernadette McNulty wrote that while the frontmen of those bands "are all being bestowed with reverential status, Brett Anderson has become the lost boy of Britpop".

Since the Britpop movement ceased to exist, Suede's popularity sharply declined, like many bands associated with it. As one writer put it toward the end of Suede's career, "Suede slid from zeitgeist into a smaller, pocket-sized cult band." In the same article, Anderson spoke about their legacy:

"It's not in my nature to be bitter. We may have been overlooked somewhat, but all you need to do is listen to the music. Our legacy speaks for itself." He added, "...Fate dealt us this card, and I don't think we've done particularly badly with it. Music today seems so very worthy, so very dull. Nobody wants to stick their neck out anymore, and I think that is a great pity. We did, and we left our mark."

"Still one of the great British bands of the '90s," David Bowie told Select in 1996. "They have the enviable knack of taking the rather pathetic fumble of a quick fuck under the pier and extracting those few golden moments that many years later convince oneself that, for one brief flickering moment, one was as inspired as Romeo or, in some cases, Juliet. The poor things are bound to be an institution by the year 2000. Dame Brett, anybody?"

At the 2010 Q Awards, Suede were honored with the "Inspiration Award." Suede were honored with the "Godlike Genius Award" at the 2015 NME Awards. New Order frontman Bernard Sumner presented the award to the band, following a video introduction of the "fantastic" and "brilliant" Suede by comedian and Suede fan Ricky Gervais.

=== Influence on other artists ===
Multiple artists have cited the band as an influence. Kele Okereke, lead singer of the London band Bloc Party, said he started making music because of Suede's Dog Man Star, calling it "the first record [he] fell in love with". Kate Jackson, lead singer of the English indie rock band The Long Blondes, has spoken in interviews about her admiration for Suede. In 2007, she admitted that Suede got her into music, saying: "Suede's debut album was unlike anything I'd heard before. It was the opposite of grunge, which I hated, and my escape from Bury St Edmunds." Christopher Owens of the Californian indie pop group Girls named Suede as one of his major influences, and his vocal style has been compared to that of Anderson. Paul Banks of the US rock band Interpol said, "As for my favorite songs, 'Animal Nitrate' was my joint when I was a teen. Kudos to Suede," while in the same NME feature, Martin Noble of Sea Power added, "Learning to play Suede songs was part of my education...They made me think that it was possible to achieve something artful, peculiar, and great". The band has also influenced acts such as Sons and Daughters, Dum Dum Girls, and Drowners, who took their name from the similarly titled Suede song. Canadian rock band Destroyer named their 2017 album Ken after the original title for "The Wild Ones".

Additionally, Suede's songs have been covered by other artists. "My Insatiable One" was performed by Morrissey during his Your Arsenal tour in 1992. "The Drowners" was recorded by the Manic Street Preachers as a b-side. "Animal Nitrate" was covered by the Libertines in concert during their reunion tour in 2015: A cover version of the same song was also recorded by Basement for the Further Sky EP. "Beautiful Ones" was recorded by Kim Wilde on her cover album Snapshots in 2011. Apoptygma Berzerk recorded a cover version of "Trash" on their Rocket Science album.

== Awards and nominations ==
Award	Year	Category	Nominee(s)	Result	Ref.
Abilu Music Awards	2016	International Rock Album of the Year	Night Thoughts	Won	
Brit Awards	1994	British Breakthrough Act	Themselves	Nominated	
Brit Awards	1994	British Group	Themselves	Nominated	
Brit Awards	1994	British Album of the Year	Suede	Nominated	
Brit Awards	1994	British Single of the Year	"Animal Nitrate"	Nominated	
Brit Awards	1994	British Video of the Year	"Animal Nitrate"	Nominated	
Brit Awards	1995	British Video of the Year	"The Wild Ones"	Nominated	
GAFFA Awards (Denmark)	1993	Best Foreign Album	Suede	Nominated	
GAFFA Awards (Denmark)	1993	Best Foreign New Act	Themselves	Nominated	
GAFFA Awards (Denmark)	1994	Best Foreign Group	Themselves	Nominated	
GAFFA Awards (Denmark)	1994	Best Foreign Live Act	Themselves	Nominated	
GAFFA Awards (Denmark)	1994	Best Foreign Album	Dog Man Star	Nominated	
GAFFA Awards (Denmark)	1996	Best Foreign Album	Coming Up	Won	
GAFFA Awards (Denmark)	1996	Best Foreign Hit	"Trash"	Won	
GAFFA Awards (Denmark)	1996	Best Foreign Band	Themselves	Won	
GAFFA Awards (Denmark)	1999	Best Foreign Band	Themselves	Won	
GAFFA Awards (Denmark)	1999	Best Foreign Live Act	Themselves	Won	
GAFFA Awards (Denmark)	1999	Best Foreign 90's Act	Themselves	Nominated	
GAFFA Awards (Denmark)	1999	Best Foreign Album	Head Music	Nominated	
GAFFA Awards (Denmark)	1999	Best Foreign Hit	"Electricity"	Nominated	
Mercury Prize	1993	Album of the Year	Suede	Won	
Mercury Prize	1997	Album of the Year	Coming Up	Nominated	
Mercury Prize	2026	Album of the Year	Antidepressants	Nominated	
NME Awards	1993	Best New Band	Themselves	Won	
NME Awards	1993	Best Single	"The Drowners"	Won	
NME Awards	1994	Best Band	Themselves	Won	
NME Awards	1996	Best Band	Themselves	Nominated	
NME Awards	1997	Best Band	Themselves	Nominated	
NME Awards	1997	Best LP	Coming Up	Nominated	
NME Awards	1997	Best Single	"Trash"	Nominated	
NME Awards	1997	Best Single	"Beautiful Ones"	Nominated	
NME Awards	1998	Radio 1 Evening Session of the Year	Themselves	Won	
NME Awards	2000	Best Album Ever	Dog Man Star	Nominated	
NME Awards	2000	Best Album	Head Music	Nominated	
NME Awards	2015	Godlike Genius Award	Themselves	Won	
Q Awards	1993	Best New Act	Themselves	Won	
Q Awards	1999	Best Live Act	Themselves	Nominated	
Q Awards	2010	Inspiration Award	Themselves	Won	
Q Awards	2013	Icon Award	Themselves	Won	
Rober Awards Music Prize	2013	Comeback of the Year	Themselves	Nominated	
Smash Hits Poll Winners Party	1994	Best Alternative/Indie Type Band	Themselves	Nominated	
Smash Hits Poll Winners Party	1996	Best Alternative/Indie Type Band	Themselves	Nominated	
Smash Hits Poll Winners Party	1996	Best Rock Outfit	Themselves	Nominated	
Smash Hits Poll Winners Party	1996	Best Album Cover	Coming Up	Nominated	

== Members ==
Current members

- Brett Anderson – lead vocals, percussion (1989–2003, 2010–present)
- Mat Osman – bass (1989–2003, 2010–present)
- Simon Gilbert – drums (1990–2003, 2010–present)
- Richard Oakes – guitar (1994–2003, 2010–present), piano, backing vocals (2002–2003)
- Neil Codling – keyboards, synthesizer, piano, guitar, backing vocals (1995–2001, 2010–present)

Former members

- Justine Frischmann – guitar, backing vocals (1989–1991)
- Bernard Butler – guitar, keyboards, piano (1989–1994)
- Justin Welch – drums (1990; substitute for Simon Gilbert 2013)
- Alex Lee – keyboards, piano, guitar, harmonica, backing vocals (2001–2003)

== Discography ==
- Suede (1993)
- Dog Man Star (1994)
- Coming Up (1996)
- Head Music (1999)
- A New Morning (2002)
- Bloodsports (2013)
- Night Thoughts (2016)
- The Blue Hour (2018)
- Autofiction (2022)
- Antidepressants (2025)
