= Love and Poison (book) =

- Author: David Barnett
- Language: English
- Genre: Autobiography
- Publisher: Carlton Publishing Group
- Publication date: 3 November 2003
- Publication place: United Kingdom
- Media type: Print (Hardback)
- Pages: 304
- ISBN: 0-233-00094-1

Love and Poison is the official biography of the English alternative rock band Suede. The book, written by long-time band associate David Barnett, reveals the real stories behind singer Brett Anderson's battle with drugs, his relationship with Elastica's Justine Frischmann and the subsequent feud with Blur after she started stepping out with Damon Albarn.

Also covered in great detail is Bernard Butler's departure from the group, which includes accurate diary entries from drummer Simon Gilbert. The recruitment of 17-year-old schoolboy Richard Oakes, as well as keyboard player Neil Codling's struggle with illness and the band's final years are explained thoroughly. One writer wrote that: "The story of why their last two albums were such a mess, for instance, is far more interesting than either record."

Compiled from hours of interviews with the band members and also featuring Frischmann, Mike Joyce and Ricky Gervais, the book also contains previously unpublished photographs. Butler was interviewed for the book, but chose not to have his quotes included.

The book was awarded 'Book of the Month' by The Observer's Music Monthly magazine.

In light of the band's 2013 reunion, Barnett released a revised edition of the book, adding extensive footnotes as new content.
