= Mat Osman =

English guitarist and writer (born 1967)

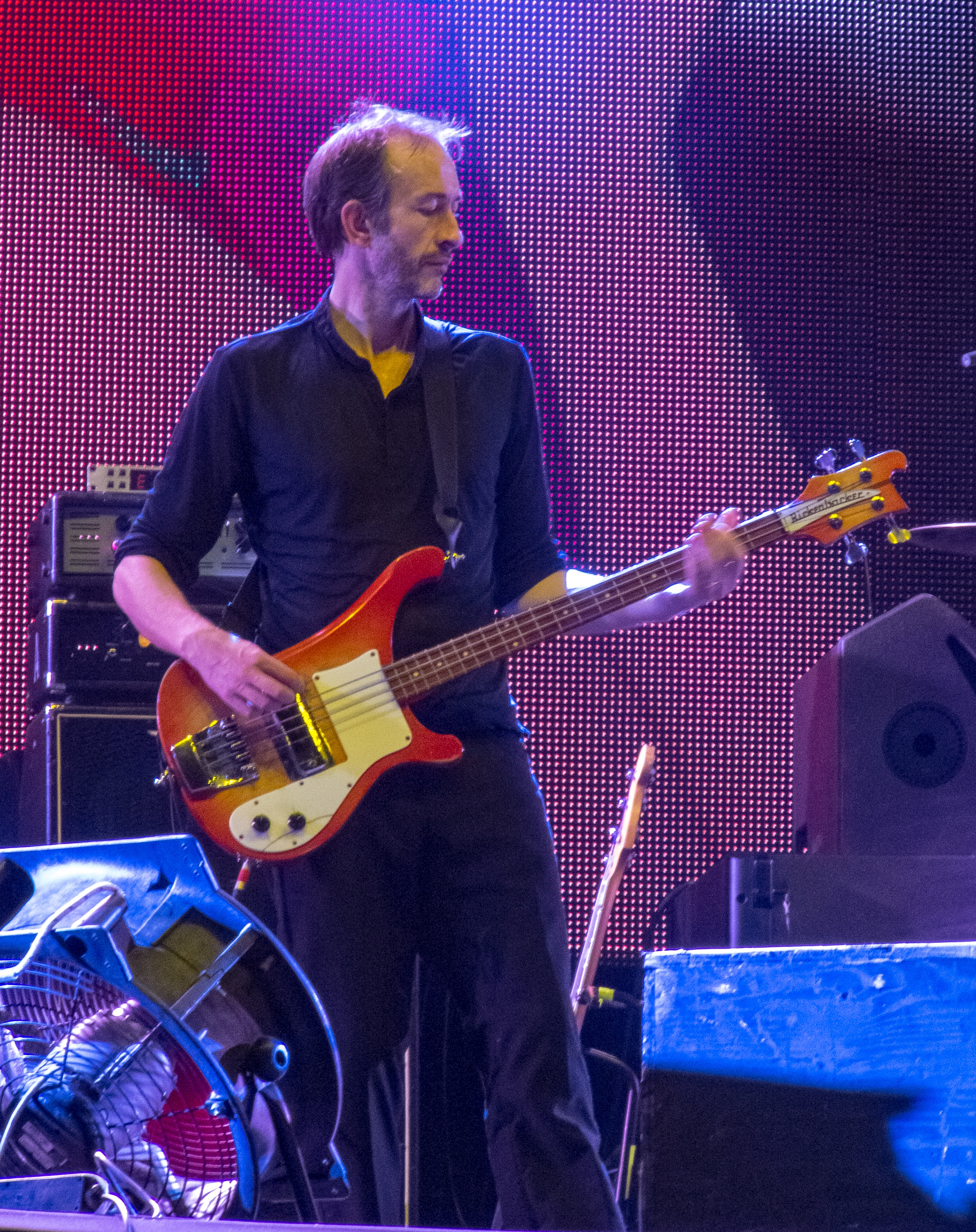
- Osman performing with Suede at Lokerse Feesten in Lokeren, Belgium in 2012

Background information
- Born: Mathew David Osman; 9 October 1967 (age 59); Welwyn Garden City, Hertfordshire, England
- Genres: Alternative rock; Britpop
- Occupations: Musician; songwriter; author; journalist
- Instrument: Bass guitar
- Years active: 1989–present
- Member of: Suede
- Website: suede.co.uk
- Height: 6 ft 5 in (1.96 m)
- Relatives: Richard Osman (brother)

Mathew David Osman (born 9 October 1967) is an English musician and author, best known as the bassist in the rock band Suede. Osman and singer Brett Anderson are the only remaining founding members left in Suede and, along with drummer Simon Gilbert, have appeared on every Suede album. Osman is also a writer: he has written two novels and contributed to various publications. Osman's younger brother by three years is the TV presenter and author Richard Osman.

== Biography ==
Osman was born in Welwyn Garden City, Hertfordshire. The family relocated to Billericay, Essex, and, when his parents separated, Osman, his mother Brenda (née Wright) and his brother moved to Haywards Heath, West Sussex.

In 1986 he gained A-levels in economics, sociology and political studies. He studied at the London School of Economics, where in 1989 he achieved a BSc in politics.

Osman met future Suede lead singer Brett Anderson in Haywards Heath, and they played together in early garage bands such as The Pigs and Suave And Elegant. Osman co-wrote some of Suede's songs, including "Lost in TV", "Europe Is Our Playground", "Attitude" and "Golden Gun". After Suede broke up in 2003, Osman provided music for television programmes, such as 8 Out of 10 Cats, The Marriage Ref and You Have Been Watching. He returned to perform with Suede when the band reformed in 2010.

Osman was the London editor of the email magazine le cool and the editor of its London guidebook, published in summer 2008. His writing has also been published in British magazines and newspapers including The Guardian, The Independent and The Observer.

Osman's first novel, The Ruins, was published in February 2020 by Repeater Books and his second, The Ghost Theatre, was published by Bloomsbury Publishing in 2023. He co-wrote the book England on Fire with Stephen Ellcock.

== Discography ==
=== With Suede ===
- Suede (1993)
- Dog Man Star (1994)
- Coming Up (1996)
- Head Music (1999)
- A New Morning (2002)
- Bloodsports (2013)
- Night Thoughts (2016)
- The Blue Hour (2018)
- Autofiction (2022)
- Antidepressants (2025)
