= Alex Lee (musician) =

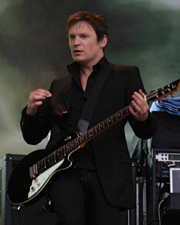
- Alex Lee performing with Placebo for a televised performance in 2007

Background information
- Born: Bristol, England
- Genres: Alternative rock; electronica
- Occupation: Musician
- Instruments: Guitar; keyboards; bass; mandolin; harmonica; glockenspiel; musical saw
- Years active: 1989–present

Alex Lee is an English musician. He has played guitar and keyboards for Goldfrapp, Massive Attack, Suede, Placebo, Strangelove and The Blue Aeroplanes amongst others. He has worked as musical director with Florence And The Machine and Marina & The Diamonds and for the Royal Shakespeare Company as well as composing regularly for film and television.

== Biography ==
Lee joined The Blue Aeroplanes in 1989, around the time that they signed to Ensign Records. He played on the 1990 album Swagger and the 1995 album Rough Music.
