= Love and Poison =

Video by Suede
- Released: 15 November 1993
- Recorded: 16 May 1993
- Length: 57 minutes
- Label: Sony/SMV Enterprises
- Director: W.I.Z.

Suede chronology
'''Love and Poison''' (1993)	'Introducing The Band' (1995)

Love and Poison (released 1993) is a live concert video of Suede's show at the Brixton Academy venue on 16 May 1993, notable for performances of songs from their debut album Suede and early B-sides. It was originally released on VHS and later on DVD for a deluxe re-issue of their debut album. In September 2020, a higher-quality remaster of the video by James Wong from the original tapes premiered on YouTube.

== Track listing ==
All songs written by Brett Anderson and Bernard Butler.

1. "The Next Life"
2. "Moving"
3. "Animal Nitrate"
4. "My Insatiable One"
5. "Metal Mickey"
6. "Pantomime Horse"
7. "He's Dead"
8. "The Drowners"
9. "Painted People"
10. "She's Not Dead"
11. "To the Birds"
12. "Sleeping Pills"
13. "So Young"
