= Weather Underground (disambiguation) =

Weather Underground was an American radical left political organization.

Weather Underground may also refer to:

- The Weather Underground (film), a 2002 documentary film about the militant group
- Weather Underground (album), an album by the rock band Geneva
- Heligoland (album), an album by the trip-hop group Massive Attack that had the working title Weather Underground
- Weather Underground (now referred to as Weather Unfiltered), an American weeknight show that airs on evenings on The Weather Channel
- Weather Underground (weather service), a San Francisco, California-based commercial weather forecasting service

== See also ==
- Weatherman (disambiguation)
