= Everything Picture =

Studio album by Ultrasound
- Released: 19 April 1999
- Length: 1:42:31
- Label: Nude

Ultrasound chronology
| Everything Picture (1999) | Play for Today (2012) |

Professional ratings
Review scores
| Source | Rating |
|---|---|
| Allmusic | 4/5 stars |
| NME | 6/10 stars |
| Select | 3/5 |

Everything Picture was the debut album by the English indie rock band Ultrasound. It was released on Nude Records, the label of Suede and Geneva, in April 1999 and reached #23 in the UK albums chart. It was released over two compact discs due to its extraordinary length; the final song alone lasted over 39 minutes.

The album spawned three singles; "Same Band", "Stay Young" and "Floodlit World". A fourth single, "Aire & Calder", was announced but was not released.

In October 2011, NME placed "Stay Young" at number 109 on its list "150 Best Tracks of the Past 15 Years".

== Track listing ==
=== CD1 ===
| No. | Title | Length |
|---|---|---|
| 1. | "Cross My Heart" | 6:58 |
| 2. | "Same Band" | 4:09 |
| 3. | "Stay Young" | 7:02 |
| 4. | "Suckle" | 7:28 |
| 5. | "Fame Thing" | 4:18 |
| 6. | "Happy Times (Are Coming)" | 8:30 |
| Total length: | | 38:25 |

=== CD2 ===
| No. | Title | Length |
|---|---|---|
| 1. | "Aire & Calder" | 6:36 |
| 2. | "Sentimental Song" | 5:40 |
| 3. | "Floodlit World" | 5:12 |
| 4. | "My Imposible Dream" | 7:26 |
| 5. | "Everything Picture" (followed by "Best Wishes") | 39:12 |
| Total length: | | 1:04:06 |
