= Boy for You =

Boy For You

Studio album by Astrid Williamson
- Released: 10 August 1998
- Length: 46:01
- Label: Nude Records

Astrid Williamson chronology
Boy For You (1998)	Carnation \ Astrid Williamson (2003)

Professional ratings
Review scores
Source	Rating
Q	4/5 stars
Melody Maker	3/5 stars

Boy for You is the first solo album recorded by Astrid Williamson and her Goya Dress colleagues Terry de Castro and Simon Pearson on bass and drums. Following record company pressure, Goya Dress broke up and the album was released under the name 'Astrid' in 1998.

The album was produced by Malcolm Burn, who has previously worked with Daniel Lanois, The Neville Brothers, Iggy Pop, Peter Gabriel, Patti Smith, Midnight Oil, and Shaun Colvin. Originally released on Nude Records, the album was reissued on One Little Indian/Incantation Records in 2006.

The song "If I Loved You" was featured on the soundtrack to Gregory's Two Girls, the 1999 sequel to Bill Forsyth's cult 1981 classic Gregory's Girl. The track was also recorded by Abra Moore, retitled 'Someone Else's Mess' and featured on the 'Serving Sara' film soundtrack.

== Critical reception ==
Melody Maker gave the album 3 out of 5 stars, writing that the album "doesn't always work" but that there were "moments of glory".

== Track listing ==
1. I Am The Boy For You
2. Everyone's Waiting
3. What Do You ...
4. World At Your Feet
5. Sing For Me
6. Someone
7. Hozanna
8. If I Loved You
9. Outside
10. Say What You Mean

== Personnel ==
- Vocals – Astrid Williamson
- Bass – Terry de Castro
- Drums – Simon Pearson
- 12 string Guitar on 'If I Loved You' – Bill Dillon
- Trumpet – Gerard Presencer
- Assistant Engineer – Zak Boulos
- Produced, engineered, additional instrumentation & mixed by Malcolm Burn
- Cover photography by Rick Guest
- All songs written by Astrid Williamson except 'Outside' by Malcolm Burn
