= Wreckage (album) =

Studio album by Overseer
- Released: 26 August 2003
- Studio: Pravda Studios (Leeds)
- Genre: Electronic; big beat
- Length: 1:16:43
- Label: Columbia
- Producer: Overseer; Dave Creffield

Robert Howes chronology
Wreckage (2003)	Offshore Breaks (2018)

Singles from Wreckage
- 1. "Coldrock / Supermoves" Released: 2002; 2. "Horndog" Released: 2003; 3. "Horndog / Doomsday" Released: 2005

Professional ratings
Review scores
Source	Rating
AllMusic	3/5 stars

Wreckage is the debut full-length studio album by British DJ/producer Robert Howes a.k.a. Overseer. It was released on 26 August 2003 via Columbia Records. Most of its tracks have been featured in advertisements, films, video games, trailers and television shows.

== Track listing ==
Wreckage (Columbia, 2003)
No.	Title	Writer(s)	Length
1.	"Slayed" (featuring Zak Speakerfreak)	Robert Howes; Zak Avery; Neville Holder; James Lea	4:47
2.	"Stompbox"	Robert Howes	3:53
3.	"Supermoves"	Robert Howes	4:47
4.	"Velocity Shift" (featuring Chris Live)	Robert Howes	2:08
5.	"Horndog" (featuring MC Nick Life & Zak Speakerfreak)	Robert Howes; Zak Avery; Claydes Smith; Dennis Thomas; George Brown; John Bowman; Mark James; Mark Jones; Richard Westfield; Robert Bell; Robert Mickens; Ronald Bell	3:31
6.	"Meteorology" (featuring Sandra Pehrsson)	Robert Howes	5:32
7.	"Aquaplane" (featuring Andrew Montgomery)	Robert Howes; Andrew Montgomery	5:14
8.	"Doomsday" (featuring MC Nick Life)	Robert Howes; Nick Life	3:14
9.	"Basstrap" (featuring Chris Live & Zak Speakerfreak)	Robert Howes; Zak Avery; Arthur Neville; Joseph Modeliste; Leo Nocentelli	4:03
10.	"Sparks" (featuring Rachel Gray)	Robert Howes; Rachel Gray	6:02
11.	"Never" (featuring Jakk Frost & Sandra Pehrsson)	Robert Howes; Tyrone Starks; Nick Hodgson	6:36
12.	"Heligoland" (featuring Brian Perkins)	Robert Howes	26:56
Total length:			1:16:43

Sample credits

- "Slayed" contains elements from "We'll Bring the House Down" by Slade
- "Velocity Shift" contains elements from "In the Morning Time" by Tramaine
- "Horndog" contains elements from "Let Me Clear My Throat" by DJ Kool
- "Basstrap" contains elements from "Just Kissed My Baby" by The Meters

== Singles ==
=== Horndog ===
The track "Horndog" was released as a single from this album. The song contains a sample from DJ Kool's Let Me Clear My Throat. Like much of Overseer's work, this track has been used for commercial purposes such as in the 2004 Mitsubishi Endeavor advertisement.

The track was also used for the Phoenix Suns player introduction video for the 2007–2008 season.

The track was also used in the trailer for the 2004 film Walking Tall.

The track was also used in the 2004 film EuroTrip.

=== Supermoves ===
"Supermoves" was used in 2002 video game Twin Caliber by Rage Software for PlayStation 2 as the main menu theme. Page 20 of the game's manual also promotes his then new EP "Force Multiply" and briefly describes Overseer.

It alongside "Doomsday" appears in Electronic Arts' 2003 video game Need for Speed: Underground.

A remixed version is featured on The Animatrix: The Album.

== Personnel ==
- Robert George Howes – producer, engineering, mixing, additional instrumentation, artwork
- Dave Creffield – producer, engineering, mixing, string arrangements
- Zak Speakerwheezel – vocals on Slayed and Stompbox
- Chris Live – vocals on Velocity Shift, Doomsday and Basstrap
- Nick Life – vocals on Horndog
- Sandra Pehrsson – vocals on Meteorology
- Andrew Montgomery – vocals on Aquaplane
- Rachael Gray – vocals on Sparks
- Jakk Frost – rap on Never
- Vicky – vocals on Never
- Ricky Wilson – mofo's on Never
- Brian Perkins – spoken word on Heligoland
- Ruth Boswell – cello on Meteorology, Never and Heligoland
- Rebekah Allan – violin on Meteorology, Never and Heligoland
- Alice Laing – violin on Never
- Emesto Estruch – violin on Meteorology and Heligoland
- Michael Whittaker – viola on Never
- Paul Jones – piano on Meteorology and Sparks
- Chris Blair – mastering
- Wally – artwork, photography
- Geoff Johnston – artwork
- Jill Strong – photography

== Charts ==
Chart (2003)	Peak position
US Top Dance Albums (Billboard)	21
