= W.I.Z. =

English director (born 1964)

- Born: Andrew John Whiston; 4 January 1964 (age 61); England
- Occupation: Director
- Years active: 1990–present

Andrew John "W.I.Z." Whiston (born 4 January 1964) is an English director of films and music videos.

== Career ==
W.I.Z. has directed a number of high-concept videos for major music artists from the United Kingdom and the United States, including Massive Attack, Kasabian, Oasis, and Marilyn Manson. Many of these videos, in addition to featuring the song and the performers, also follow a running narrative, and may contain a political or social message. Once in a band himself, W.I.Z. has also directed concert films of live performances by the bands Suede, Manic Street Preachers and Primal Scream.

He has directed two short films: Weekender and Baby. The 1992 film Weekender follows the band Flowered Up and displays the hedonistic side of club and drug culture; the 13-minute film was screened on Channel 4 in Britain.

W.I.Z.'s second short film Baby made its European debut at the 2000 Edinburgh International film festival and its U.S. debut at the MVPA Director's Cuts 2000 film festival. In February 2003, W.I.Z.'s video for Black Rebel Motorcycle Club's "Whatever Happened to My Rock 'N Roll" was named as MTV2 Europe's "Best Video of the Year 2002" by the NME Carling Awards.

As of 2012 he was signed to the production company My Accomplice. He previously worked with Academy Films, Factory Films and Oil Factory Inc.

== Selected videography ==
2019

- MIKA – "Sanremo"
- MIKA – "Tiny Love"

2017

- Kasabian – "You're in Love with a Psycho"
- Kasabian – "Bless This Acid House"

2013

- Disclosure – "Voices"
- Kings of Leon – "Supersoaker"

2012

- Ellie Goulding – "Figure 8"
- Emeli Sandé – "Clown"
- Robbie Williams – "Different"
- Dark Horses – "Strait Street"

2010

- Magnetic Man feat. Katy B – "Perfect Stranger"
- Hurts – "Better Than Love", "Sunday"

2009

- Dizzee Rascal – "Dirtee Cash"
- Oasis – "Falling Down"
- Kasabian – "Fire", "Vlad the Impaler"

2008

- Oasis – "I'm Outta Time"

2007

- Clinic – "Tomorrow"
- Dizzee Rascal – "Sirens"
- Kaiser Chiefs – "The Angry Mob"

2006

- All Saints – "Rock Steady"
- Arctic Monkeys – "The View from the Afternoon"
- Kasabian – "Empire"

2005

- Will Young – "All Time Love"

2004

- The 411 – "Teardrops"
- Jamelia – "See It in a Boy's Eyes"
- Kasabian – "Club Foot", "L.S.F."

2003

- Stereophonics – "Maybe Tomorrow"
- Dirty Harry – "So Real"
- Cradle of Filth – "Babalon A.D. (So Glad for the Madness)"

2002

- Black Rebel Motorcycle Club – "Whatever Happened to My Rock 'N Roll", "We're All in Love"
- Oasis – "Stop Crying Your Heart Out", "The Hindu Times"
- Shakira – "Te Dejo Madrid"

2001

- Marilyn Manson – "The Fight Song"
- Zero 7 – "In the Waiting Line"

2000

- The Smashing Pumpkins – "Stand Inside Your Love"
- Primal Scream – "Accelerator"

1999

- The Chemical Brothers – "Out of Control"
- Leftfield – "Dusted"
- Melanie B – "Word Up"

1998

- All Saints – "War of Nerves"
- DJ Rap – "Bad Girl"
- Ian Brown – "My Star"
- Manic Street Preachers – "If You Tolerate This Your Children Will Be Next"
- Massive Attack – "Inertia Creeps"

1997

- Marilyn Manson – "Man That You Fear"
- Suede – "He's Dead"

1996

- Manic Street Preachers – "Everything Must Go"

1995

- Del Amitri – "Here and Now"
- Simple Minds – "Hypnotised"
- Therapy? – "Loose", "Diane"

1994

- The Black Crowes – "A Conspiracy"
- Brand New Heavies – "Back to Love"
- The Charlatans – "Jesus Hairdo"
- Deee-Lite – "Picnic in the Summertime"

1993

- Jamiroquai – "Too Young to Die", "Emergency on Planet Earth"
- Suede – Love and Poison (concert video), "Metal Mickey", "She's Not Dead"

1992

- Flowered Up – "Weekender"
- Happy Mondays – "Stinkin' Thinkin'"

1991

- Manic Street Preachers – "You Love Us", "Love's Sweet Exile"

1990

- Bocca Juniors – "Raise (53 Steps to Heaven)"
- Nish (short film)
