= Rooms (album) =

Studio album by Goya Dress
- Released: April 17, 1996
- Length: 36:35
- Label: Nude
- Producer: John Cale

Rooms is the only album released by Goya Dress, the Scottish band fronted by Astrid Williamson released on Nude Records in 1996. The album was produced by John Cale, musician and former member of The Velvet Underground.

== Critical reception ==
This release on Suede's Nude Records drew favourable comparisons to the band: AllMusic called Rooms "every bit as elegant, grand and enchanting as the glam revivalists Dog Man Star." while the NME recalled their "idiosyncratic, atmospheric sound straddled a rich range of styles."

== Track listing ==
1. "Sweet Dreams For You"
2. "Crush"
3. "Scorch"
4. "Rooms"
5. "Greatest Secret"
6. "Glorious"
7. "Any John"
8. "Katie Stood On the Benches"
9. "Picture This"
10. "The Maritime Waltz"

== Personnel and recording details ==
- Astrid Williamson - vocals, guitar, piano, string arrangements
- Terry de Castro - bass, backing vocals
- Simon Pearson - drums
- James Banbury - cello
- Abigail Trundle - cello
- Alex Poots - trumpet
- Dick Morgan - oboe
- Teresa Whipple - viola
- Geoff Leach - Hammond organ
- Anton Kirkpatrick - guitar
- Mark Crooks - clarinet
- Marcus Broome - violin
- John Cale - Producer and Mixing
- Martin Brass - Engineer and Production Assistance
- Dave Bascombe - Additional Mixing
- All songs written by Astrid Williamson and Goya Dress
- Photography by Vincent MacDonald
