= Further (Geneva album) =

Album by Geneva

Studio album by Geneva
- Released: 9 June 1997
- Recorded: 1996–1997, London
- Genre: Indie rock, indie pop, art rock
- Length: 45:57
- Label: Nude (UK); The WORK Group (US)
- Producer: Mike Hedges

Geneva chronology
Further (1997)	Weather Underground (2000)

Professional ratings
Review scores
Source	Rating
AllMusic	4/5 stars
Smash Hits	4/5 stars
Uncut	4/5 stars

Further is the debut studio album by the Scottish indie rock band Geneva. It was released on 9 June 1997 and reached No. 20 on the UK Albums Chart. Further includes the singles "No One Speaks", "Into the Blue", "Tranquillizer" and "Best Regrets".

The band recorded the songs for album with Mike Hedges between 1996 and 1997 (who had just finished producing the Manic Street Preachers' album Everything Must Go). Receiving positive reviews the album was originally released as a CD, Cassette and LP on 9 June 1997 by Nude Records. The artwork was designed by Struktur design with photography by Steve Niedorf and Harry Borden.

== Track listing ==
All songs written by Andrew Montgomery and Steven Dora, except where noted.

1. "Temporary Wings" - 3:13
2. "Into the Blue" (Montgomery, Stuart Evans, Keith Graham) - 3:24
3. "The God of Sleep" - 3:05
4. "Best Regrets" - 4:05
5. "Tranquillizer" (Montgomery, Graham) - 3:31
6. "Further" - 4:52
7. "No One Speaks" - 3:35
8. "Worry Beads" - 4:48
9. "Fall Apart Button" (Montgomery, Graham) - 3:12
10. "Wearing Off" - 3:31
11. "Nature's Whore" - 3:20
12. "In the Years Remaining" - 5:18

== Personnel ==
- Andrew Montgomery - Vocals
- Steven Dora - Guitar
- Keith Graham - Bass
- Stuart Evans - Guitar
- Douglas Caskie - Drums

Additional musicians

- Gini Ball
- Sian Bell
- Dinah Beamish
- Sally Herbert
- Clare Orsler
- Jocelyn Pook
- Anne Stephenson
