= Carnation (album) =

Carnation \ Astrid

Studio album by Astrid Williamson
- Released: 2002
- Recorded: The Milkhouse, Brighton
- Length: 52:56
- Label: Incarnation Records

Astrid Williamson chronology
Boy For You (1998)	Carnation \ Astrid (2002)	Day Of The Lone Wolf (2006)

Professional ratings
Review scores
Source	Rating
AllMusic	4/5 stars

Carnation is the second album from the singer songwriter Astrid Williamson released on her own label, Incarnation Records, in 2002. It was reissued under the title Astrid Williamson in 2003, adding 4 acoustic demos to the track listing. In comparison to her debut, Boy For You, it was "a decidedly more stripped down affair, based mostly on acoustic guitar or piano". Both producer Robert White & musician Terry Bickers were members of the psyche rock band, Levitation plus Robert's Milk & Honey Band recruited Astrid to play with them for live dates in the 2000s.

== Track listing ==
1. Never Enough
2. Love
3. To Love You
4. Bye & Bye
5. Blood Horizon
6. Calling
7. Girlfriend
8. Tumbling Into Blue
9. Lucky
10. Call For Beauty

Only on 2003 'Astrid' reissue

1. Superman
2. This Is How It's Done Here
3. Blood Horizon
4. Close My Eyes

== Personnel and recording details ==
- Produced and mixed by Astrid Williamson and Robert White
- Astrid Williamson – vocals, E-bow, piano, synthesizer, electric guitar
- Satin Singh – percussion
- Terry Bickers – electric guitar, harmonica
- Mik Tubb – 12 string electric guitar
- Robert White – bass guitar, electric organ, mandolin, arrangements, tambourine. electric guitar
