= Sleepy People =

British psychedelic rock band

- Origin: Wakefield, England
- Genres: alternative rock, post-punk, psychedelic rock, progressive pop
- Years active: 1989–2003, 2017–present
- Labels: Org Records, Edgy Records, Bad Apple Records
- Spinoffs: Ultrasound
- Members: Paul Hope; Andrew "Tiny" Wood; Rachel Theresa Hope; Graeme Swaddle; Mark Wallis
- Past members: Liz Waudby; Kerry Harrison; Richard Green; Adrian "Bill" Bailey; Danny Orange; Phil "Earl Slick" Sears; Anna "Tanglewood" Blaydon; Gary "Spangles" Bowden; Mark Greenwood; Lee Haley; Mark Dunphy; Tom Evans

Sleepy People (sometimes also known as Blue Apple Boy) is a British psychedelic rock band known for eccentric, energetic songs and live performances, as well as for incubating several future members of Britpop band Ultrasound.

The band has an eclectic musical approach blending psychedelic rock, New Wave pop, punk and progressive rock (other ingredients have included noise-rock, nursery rhymes, ska, Muzak, bossa nova, circus/fairground music, tango and anything else which the band members find inspiring). Sleepy People is strongly influenced by other theatrical British psychedelic band such as Cardiacs and The Monochrome Set, with lyrics varying from cheerful or sinister nonsense to surreal representations of everyday life and hallucinatory twists on eccentric stories from tabloid newspapers.

There is a difference between Sleepy People and The Sleepy People (a New Wave indie rock band from Oregon) or Sleeping People (a Californian progressive rock band).

== Sleepy People band history ==
=== Formation and early years (1989-1991) ===
Sleepy People began in Wakefield, Yorkshire circa 1989, when students on Wakefield College's Popular and Commercial Music became friends. These included songwriter and former coal miner Paul Hope, mature student Andrew "Tiny" Wood, teenaged classical cellist and bass guitarist Richard Green, drummer Andy Peace and singing flute player Rachel Theresa Hope (Paul's wife). Paul Hope and Tiny Wood first teamed up in a band called Step TLV. The two along with Rachel Hope would subsequently work together as Pop Kid, who released a lone cassette album called Strange Planets Emerging From Behind The Coal Shed. The loose ensemble of musical friends later relocated to Newcastle upon Tyne, where Wood and Green pursued music degrees. They established themselves in a run-down house in the suburb of Jesmond (which they called "Sleepy Hall") .

=== The first lineup and Blunt Nails in a Sharp Wall (1992-1995) ===
Pop Kid had by now developed into the first line-up of Sleepy People - Paul Hope (guitar, vocals), Rachel Theresa Hope (flute, vocals), Richard Green (bass guitar), Kerry Harrison (drums) and Liz Waudby (keyboards), with Tiny Wood as lead singer and frontman. The band began making themselves a fixture at various small venues on the British live circuit. Though tuneful, Sleepy People's music was complicated, demanding and often considered noncommercial, winning over some audiences and confusing others. To bolster its impact, the band devised a stage show which Paul Hope described as "designed to provoke a response on the soporific and conservative pub circuit up and down the country, and at that we excelled!" The show was in the theatrical/absurdist tradition of early Split Enz and early Cardiacs, featuring eccentric outfits, make-up and haircuts plus music hall comedy. Tiny Wood made the most of his bulky physique and imposing stage presence, including at least one performance when he dressed up as a Chinese mandarin.

During the first few years of recording and touring, the band underwent the first of its many personnel changes. Pete Haslam replaced Liz Waudby on keyboards, and Andy Peace replaced Kerry Harrison on drums. Peace was himself replaced by Graeme Swaddle (formerly with legendary Tyneside psych band Dead Flowers), who'd remain the band's longterm drummer.

In 1994, Sleepy People issued their first album Blunt Nails in a Sharp Wall. The songs – based on a broad template of tightly played psychedelic pop – were eccentric and sometimes absurdist, with ingredients veering from the disco stylings of "Sordid Sentimental" to the Gong-inspired sprightliness of "Mr Marconi's Unusual Theory", the full-on progressive rock fantasia of "Rare Bird at the Window" and the harder-rocking "Nicky's Little Army" (the latter inspired by the orphanages in Nicolae Ceaușescu's Romania). Originally put out as a self-released cassette (with distribution help from the "Organ" fanzine, who'd supported the band from the early days), the album was eventually re-released on CD by Org Records in 1999.

In 1995, Sleepy People suffered a major line-up change when Tiny Wood, Richard Green and Pete Haslam all left Sleepy People in order to move to London and set up a new band, Pop-A-Cat-A-Petal, with former Sleepies drummer Andy Peace.

=== Typhoid and Swans, Paint a Ceiling on the Sky and the Ultrasound connection (1995-1997) ===
To replace the departed members, Paul and Rachel Hope recruited a new lead singer - Phil "Earl Slick" Sears - plus bass player Adrian "Bill" Bailey and keyboard player Danny “Orange” Robinson. A self-released double A-side single featuring the new line-up ("Home Is Where Your Telly Is/Hanghar") kept up the band's momentum; although Orange and Bailey both left in 1997 to be respectively replaced by Anna Blaydon (also known as "Anna Tanglewood") and Gary "Spangles" Bowden.

In 1997, the band signed a deal with Edgy Records and recorded and released their second album Typhoid and Swans. The band's songs were now less eccentric than previously. Hope was favouring more direct lyrics and making use of Sear's rich quasi-operatic voice, although signs of the band's more theatrical past remained in the shape of the lengthy "Everything You Know Is Wrong". Former Gong violinist Graham Clark made a guest appearance on the album. Several songs from this period were recorded for a live-in-the-studio mini-album called Paint a Ceiling on the Sky, which was released on cassette.

Meanwhile, down in London, the former Sleepy People members in Pop-A-Cat-A-Petal had released a four-song cassette EP in 1994 via Org Records. Following the departure of Pete Haslam and the addition of Vanessa Best and Matt Jones, the band reinvented themselves in 1996 as Ultrasound. The new band suddenly began to attract avid attention on the London gig circuit and were soon being chased by various record labels. Following a single released on Fierce Panda, Ultrasound signed to Nude Records and became an up-and-coming name in late-period Britpop. In turn, Sleepy People gained attention from interest in Ultrasound's prehistory. Still friendly with his former bandmates, Paul Hope cheerfully exploited the connection whenever and wherever he could.

=== All Systems Fail - the Lee Haley period (1998-1999) ===
Further Sleepy People line-up changes followed in 1998, when Phil Sears left the band to try his own luck in London (and, later, Australia) and Gary Bowden also left, following clashes with Hope. They were replaced by bass player Mark Greenwood and teenage singer Lee Haley. This line-up of Sleepy People recorded the 1998 cassette single "All Systems Fail/Every Wave Is Higher on the Beach".

Lee Haley was a lighter singer than Sears and brought an air of cool insouciance to the band, which by now had jettisoned most of the make-up, costumes, and theatrics in favour of letting the music work by itself. However, Haley's time with the band was brief, and he left in 1999 to form a more straightforward band called The Embassy.

=== The "Blue Apple Boy" period, part 1 - Mark Dunphy (2000-2001) ===
Although Phil Sears obliged Sleepy People by filling in as lead singer for several gigs, he was unable to make a long-term commitment. The band then recruited Mark Dunphy (the brother of Cud guitarist Mike Dunphy), whose more flamboyant singing style returned the band to their previous sound; while new bass player Tom Evans replaced Mark Greenwood.

In 2000, in search of a fresh start, Sleepy People changed their name to Blue Apple Boy (a name apparently based on Masonic imagery). Initially, the name change led to a new lease of life for the band. The band recorded a new double A-side single – "Who’s That Calling?/Sunshine Valley Paradise Club" – which was released as a one-off arrangement with cult Oxford indie label Shifty Disco. Both songs were inspired by bizarre true-life newspaper stories: a tale of a man falling off a bridge while conversing on his cellphone, and one of unpleasant goings on in a retirement home. Former Sleepy People/Ultrasound member Richard Green (by then leading his own Leeds-based band The Somatics) added noise-guitar to "Sunshine Valley Paradise Club". The single attracted attention from the national music press, leading to an appearance in Melody Maker.

Blue Apple Boy followed up with a more sinister single called "Freak" (released on the band's own Bad Apple Records) which dealt with vigilante/mob violence and was inspired by the then-current paedophile panic in the UK (during which several innocent people had been harmed by mobs on the suspicion of being paedophiles). Unfortunately, "Freak" did not gain the same level of attention as its predecessor, and this disappointment added to the band's continuing instability. In 2001, Dunphy was asked to leave the band after falling out with Paul Hope. Evans and Blaydon also chose to depart at this point, leaving the band once again reduced to a trio of the Hopes plus the loyal Graeme Swaddle.

=== The "Blue Apple Boy" period, part 2 - return of Tiny Wood; Salient; band splits (2002-2003) ===
Paul Hope restructured the band yet again, re-recruiting Bill Bailey as bass guitarist. The keyboard playing role was taken over by Rachel Theresa, adding Moog synthesizer work to her flute-playing and singing. At around the same time, following the collapse of Ultrasound, Tiny Wood had returned to Newcastle to form a new band called Siren. Having also renewed his musical relationship with Paul Hope, Wood agreed to join Blue Apple Boy as singer.

Revitalised, the band set about assembling the debut Blue Apple Boy album. Wood re-recorded vocals for earlier songs (including some late Sleepy People ones), rewrote others and worked on new material with Hope. Credited to "Blue Apple Boy featuring Tiny Wood", the Salient album was released on the Soma Sound label in 2002, and displayed a further strengthening of the band's songwriting skills. Tiny Wood co-wrote two of the album's songs - "Jump Start" (a rewrite of "Freak" with new Wood lyrics) and "Cold War" (a conceptual sequel to the Ultrasound anthem "Stay Young"). Although Wood sang on most tracks, the band was now pursuing a more flexible approach to vocals. Rachel Theresa sang lead vocals on "Leave The Mud for the Worms" and the Gurdjieff-influenced bossa-nova "The Moon Is Hungry", while "Apples And Pears" featured the Hopes' eldest child, Dorothy Pippin.

Although Salient gained some extra attention due to the presence of Tiny, this didn't expand beyond the existing Blue Apple Boy/Sleepy People/Ultrasound fanbase. Blue Apple Boy effectively split up in 2003, although the end of the band was never formally announced.

=== Interim ===
From 2003 onward, Paul and Rachel Hope concentrated mainly on running The Sky Apple Cafe, their vegetarian restaurant in Newcastle. Both Hopes became chefs and managers, with Tiny Wood also involved. The various core band members retained their friendships (although the stress of running the restaurant would eventually end the Hopes' marriage). Tiny Wood would continue, on and off, with Siren and would rejoin a reformed Ultrasound in 2010.

Paul Hope returned to musical work in 2009, forming an intermittent new trio called The River Valley Giants (with Julie Carpenter and Beresford Francis Delany) containing elements of post-punk, progressive rock and film soundtrack music. They released an EP called Three Irrational Songs and, among other projects, reworked the Sleepy People song "Halfway World". The band sometimes featured contributions from other members of the Sleepy People family, with Tiny singing lead vocals on one of the EP songs and the Hopes' daughter Dorothy Pippin Hope singing backup on others.

=== Reunion (2017-present) ===
In 2017, after a fourteen-year break, Sleepy People reformed under their original name. The band now featured the 'Salient' lineup - Paul & Rachel Hope, Tiny Wood, Bill Bailey, Graeme Swaddle - plus new keyboard player/guitarist Mark Wallis. The news emerged via various postings on Facebook and the uploading of new rehearsal videos on YouTube.

The band's return to live work began with a gig in Preston on 11 November 2017. Despite Bailey's departure from the band in 2018, more gigs followed that year, with Wallis moving to bass guitar and Rachel Hope now covering all keyboard parts. A new Sleepy People track, "As a Matter of Fact" (a reworking of a River Valley Giants song), appeared on the double album The Whole World Window II (a charity album raising funds for Tim Smith in August 2018).

== Discography (Sleepy People) ==
=== Albums ===
- Blunt Nails in a Sharp Wall (1994), cassette release (reissued as CD, Org Records 1999)
- Typhoid And Swans (1997), Edgy Records

=== Singles ===
- "Home Is Where Your Telly Is" (1996), Edgy Records
- "All Systems Fail/Every Wave Is Higher on the Beach" (1998) cassette release

=== Mini-albums ===
- Paint A Ceiling on the Sky (1997) cassette release

== Discography (Blue Apple Boy) ==
=== Albums ===
- Salient (2002), Soma Sound

=== Singles ===
- "Who’s That Calling?/Sunshine Valley Paradise Club" (2000), Shifty Disco
- "Freak" (2000), Bad Apple Records
