= Weather Underground (album) =

Studio album by Geneva
- Released: 3 June 2000
- Genre: Pop
- Length: 53:39
- Label: Nude
- Producers: Howie B, TommyD

Geneva chronology
| Further (1997) | Weather Underground (2000) |

Weather Underground is the second and final album by the Scottish band Geneva, released in 2000 on Nude Records. "Dollars in the Heavens" peaked at No. 59 on the UK Singles Chart.

== Critical reception ==
Professional ratings
Review scores
| Source | Rating |
|---|---|
| AllMusic | 2.5/5 stars |
| Drowned in Sound | 8/10 |
| The Encyclopedia of Popular Music | 3/5 stars |
| Q | 3/5 stars |

Exclaim! wrote that the band's "sweeping pop tracks can definitely push all the right buttons, and singer Andrew Montgomery's voice swells to heights that would make the Castrato opera singers wince."

== Track listing ==
All songs written by Andrew Montgomery and Stuart Evans, except where noted.

1. "Dollars in the Heavens" - 3:47
2. "If You Have to Go" - 4:07
3. "Killing Stars" - 3:57
4. "Museum Mile" (Montgomery, Douglas Caskie) - 6:01
5. "Amnesia Valley" - 3:53
6. "Morricone" (Keith Graham) - 5:10
7. "Guidance System" (Montgomery, Graham) - 3:48
8. "Cassie" (Graham) - 4:19
9. "Rockets Over California" (Montgomery, Steven Dora) - 5:36
10. "A Place in the Sun" (Montgomery, Steven Dora) - 5:39
11. "Have You Seen the Horizon Lately?" - 7:22

== Personnel ==
- Steven Dora (guitar)
- Keith Graham (bass)
- Andrew Montgomery (vocals)
- Stuart Evans (guitar)
- Douglas Caskie (drums)
