= Animal Nitrate =

1993 single by Suede

Single by Suede

from the album Suede
- B-side: "The Big Time"; "Painted People"
- Released: 22 February 1993
- Recorded: 1992
- Studio: Master Rock (London, England)
- Genre: Britpop; pop rock; glam rock; power pop
- Length: 3:27
- Label: Nude
- Songwriters: Brett Anderson; Bernard Butler
- Producer: Ed Buller

Suede singles chronology
"Metal Mickey" (1992)	"Animal Nitrate" (1993)	"So Young" (1993)

Music video
- "Animal Nitrate" on YouTube

Audio sample
- file; help

"Animal Nitrate" is the third single by English rock band Suede, released through Nude Records on 22 February 1993 and later included on the band's debut album, Suede (1993). It charted at No. 7 on the UK Singles Chart, making it the highest-charting single from the album. The song is the band's highest-charting single in Ireland and New Zealand, peaking at No. 11 in both countries. It also debuted and peaked at No. 21 in Sweden but stayed on the chart for only two weeks. The accompanying music video was directed by Pedro Romhanyi.

== Background ==
Suede had received widespread media coverage in the year leading up to the release of the debut album in March 1993. "Animal Nitrate", released one month before the album, was the third in a triptych of singles following on from the successful first two singles, "The Drowners" and "Metal Mickey". The song originated with its opening riff, written by guitarist Bernard Butler who was inspired "totally secretly" by "Smells Like Teen Spirit". According to Butler, he conceived this guitar part during rehearsal in early 1992 and presented it to singer Brett Anderson, who was slow to warm to it.

The title of the song is a reference to the inhalant drug amyl nitrite, although Anderson has said it has more to do with other drugs like ecstasy and cocaine. He came up with the song's lyrical theme after going through a period where he said "drugs were taking the place of people." Chris Jones, reviewing Suede's debut album for the BBC, concurred: "Despite its punning title it’s a thrill-seeking slice of cynicism that perfectly summed up what it was like to be young and chemically imbalanced in the nation’s capital at the time."

The original working title for the song was "Dixon", as Butler's guitar part during the chorus was inspired by the intro to popular BBC television series Dixon of Dock Green. The song was almost overlooked as a single. Initially, Anderson was convinced that the ballad "Sleeping Pills" would be the third single, but he was overruled by Nude Records owner Saul Galpern who insisted that "Nitrate" had the broader commercial appeal. Speaking to NME in 2013 on writing the song, Anderson said: "We were rehearsing it for months and months and Bernard kept asking me if I had any lyrics for it and I wanted something special to say over the top of what he’s written. I like the fact it’s a song about a dark, murky world that ended up in the Top 10." Indeed, Anderson had stated in the first Melody Maker cover story in April 1992 that his fantasy was to have written a top-10 UK single about "some bizarre sexual experience."

== Release and promotion ==
The song was first performed live six months before its actual release at the 1992 Reading Festival. Throughout late 1992, the song would feature at many of Suede's UK live shows along with many other songs which made it on to the album. It would receive its largest audience when the band played the song at the 1993 Brit Awards one week prior to its release. When the NME heard that Suede had been left off the nominations for the Brit Awards, they began a weekly campaign to get them to perform at the awards on the night. The song was nominated for Best British Single at the following year's Brit Awards. The single was released in the UK on 22 February 1993 and became the band's first top-10 single, charting at No. 7 on the UK Singles Chart. The single remained at No. 7 the following week. At the time this was considered a rare feat for an indie band, something which Saul Galpern points to the Brits performance as the reason for its success. It is estimated the performance reached approximately nine million homes. While the song's subject matter may not have particularly appealed to the masses, Anderson agreed that it did reach a wide audience due to its hooks and radio friendly appeal.

In continental Europe, the song was released on 1 March 1993. The single was the band's big breakthrough in Sweden, a country where the band would have long-term future success. Two weeks prior to the release of the single, Sony Music Sweden had ordered finished product directly from Nude Records and sent it to key radio producers, media and retailers. The promotion efforts paid off when "Animal Nitrate" became a big radio hit in Sweden and generated strong interest in the band's first Swedish gig. The special showcase in Stockholm on the second date of the band's European tour on 21 April 1993 was sold out the month before. The single peaked on the Swedish charts at No. 21 on 24 March.

== Reception and legacy ==
Larry Flick of Billboard magazine wrote: "Follow-up to debut U.S. single 'Metal Mickey' not as hard-hitting, but a strong cut no less. Sound is skewed toward power pop, with emphasis on heavy melody and stomping rhythms. Perhaps too much emphasis on the latter, however, as single lacks fluidity. Much-touted lead singer Brett Anderson wrenches his vocals from the gut, recalling early performances from Duran Duran's Simon LeBon." Richard Plunkett of The Age awarded it 'Single of the Week', writing: "This single is their album's strongest, an irresistible mix of strange guitar riffery, manic rhythm section and a personality desperately craving to be noticed." Martin Aston of Music Week said the song "has a wonderfully addictive chorus" and "plenty of glam-pop charm." Previewing the band’s 27 March show at Dublin’s Tivoli Theatre, Tony Clayton-Lea of the Sunday Tribune called it "a cracker of a song." Tony Cross of Smash Hits was more mixed, calling it a "simply 'OK'" song. He wrote: "Brett's ever so English (and ever so affected) vocals judder through sometimes awkward guitars in what ends up as, at times, just a jittery and sinister racket." Select ranked the song at No. 1 in its singles of the year for 1993.

In March 2005, Q placed "Animal Nitrate" at No. 97 in its list of the 100 Greatest Guitar Tracks. In May 2007, NME magazine placed "Animal Nitrate" at No. 43 in its list of the 50 Greatest Indie Anthems Ever. In 2012 the same magazine placed the song at No. 14 on its 100 Best Tracks of the Nineties. It again recognised the song in 2014 by ranking it at No. 33 in its list of the 500 Greatest Songs of All Time. A 2010 Radio X poll of listeners, presenters and a team of experts compiled a list of the top 1000 songs of all time, where "Animal Nitrate" ranked at No. 60. In 2014, Paste listed the song at No. 29 in its 50 Best Britpop Songs. Caroline Sullivan of The Guardian included the song in her "10 of the Best" Britpop songs. She said that "Butler's opening riff is one of the most undeniable in pop." Classic Rock included Butler's guitar solo at No. 94 in their list of the "100 greatest guitar solos in rock." Paul Nolan of Hot Press called the song "one of the greatest singles of the ’90s," in a review of the band's first night performance of their eponymous album at the 2011 three-night residency at the Dublin Olympia Theatre.

== Music video ==
The music video for the title track was directed by Pedro Romhanyi and produced by Steven Elliott for Oil Factory. The video was filmed in Lisson Green housing estate in the London borough City of Westminster. The band reportedly used flat No. 18 and paid the occupants a tenner for the inconvenience caused.

The video, which consists of a studio shoot, broken up by location footage filmed on a London housing estate, featuring a pig's head and a range of mysterious masks, was released on 22 February 1993. The band caused some controversy with the video as scenes involving a fat lady in a bikini, and someone kissing a man with a pig's head were cut from various screenings. In the UK, the ITV network refused to air the video during daytime programming as it features scenes of two men kissing and embracing. "[The video] was too contentious for the Saturday lunchtime slot," said an ITV spokesperson. Howard Wuelfing, a New York publicist for Columbia Records, defended the video as mere "flirting with sexual imagery... through androgyny." The band took cocaine to prepare for the video. Anderson wanted to replicate the energy of their live shows, he explained: "We weren't experienced enough at the time to just do it on cue. I think we ended up getting a load of coke in and jumping around like lunatics. Back in the days when we used to do things like that."

It won the first MTV Euro Video Song Contest in 1993.

== Track listings ==
All songs written by Brett Anderson and Bernard Butler.

- 7-inch and cassette single
1. "Animal Nitrate"
2. "The Big Time"
- 12-inch and CD single
1. "Animal Nitrate"
2. "Painted People"
3. "The Big Time"

== Charts ==
=== Weekly charts ===
Weekly chart performance for "Animal Nitrate"
Chart (1993)	Peak position
Australia (ARIA)	89
Europe (Eurochart Hot 100)	23
Ireland (IRMA)	11
Israel (IBA)	6
New Zealand (Recorded Music NZ)	11
Sweden (Sverigetopplistan)	21
UK Singles (Official Charts)	7
UK Airplay (Music Week)	14
UK Indie (Music Week)	1

=== Year-end charts ===
Year-end chart performance for "Animal Nitrate"
Chart (1993)	Position
Israel (IBA)	49

== Certifications ==
Certifications for "Animal Nitrate"
Region	Certification	Certified units/sales
United Kingdom (BPI)	Silver	200,000^{‡}
^{‡} Sales+streaming figures based on certification alone.

== Release history ==
Release dates and formats for "Animal Nitrate"
Region	Date	Format(s)	Label(s)	Ref.
United Kingdom	22 February 1993	7-inch vinyl; 12-inch vinyl; CD; cassette	Nude	
Europe	1 March 1993	CD	Nude	
Japan	18 March 1993	CD	Nude	
Australia	21 June 1993	CD; cassette	Nude	

== Cover versions ==
Basement covered the song on their 2014 EP Further Sky. Zachary Houle of PopMatters wrote that the cover "strip[ped] away all of the glam" of the original, making it "a straightforward rock anthem." Alternative Press contributor Brian Kraus considered it "faithful to the original" and the best song on the EP. He called it "a fine fit" amongst the "lighthearted moods" found on the EP. AbsolutePunk staff member Aj LaGambina thought the track "blend[ed] in as if it" was one of the band's own compositions. Punknews.org reviewer RENALDO69 called the cover "tight—knit and sharp" within the "very polished" EP. In September 2015, the Libertines performed a live version of the song at a gig at Camden's Dublin Castle in London.
