= Ultrasound (band) =

English rock band

- Origin: London, England
- Genres: Britpop, alternative rock
- Years active: 1997–99, 2010–present
- Label: Nude
- Members: Andrew "Tiny" Wood; Richard Green; Vanessa Best; Bruce Renshaw
- Past members: Matt Jones; Andy Peace; Bob Birch

Ultrasound are an English indie rock band. With roots in the British underground psychedelic and experimental rock scenes of the 1980s and early 1990s, the band emerged in 1997 and soon gained attention for their "operatic prog-glam ambitions" and "violent reworking of the idiosyncratic compositions of Captain Beefheart and the staged ambisexual pop idioms of the likes of Marc Bolan and David Bowie".

Signing a high-profile deal with Nude Records at the tail-end of the Britpop era, the band released several well-received singles and were tagged as "another big, bright hope for British music" but split up acrimoniously in 1999 following the release of their debut album Everything Picture. Reuniting in early 2010, Ultrasound have gone on to tour and to release two further albums.

== History ==
=== Roots and origins (Possession, Step-TLV, Sleepy People and Pop-A-Cat-A-Petal - 1980-1995) ===
Future Ultrasound singer/rhythm guitarist Andrew "Tiny" Wood was born in Birkenhead and began his musical career in 1980 (under the pseudonym of "Anna Virgina War") in the experimental/industrial trio Possession with Victor Watkins and Stephen Thrower. Possession released one album on the A-Mission label in 1984 (The Thin White Arms, Obtusely Angled At the Elbow, Methodically Dipping and Emerging) before breaking up, with Thrower moving on to Coil the following year. Wood subsequently played with guitarist and songwriter Paul Hope in a band called Step TLV.

By 1989, aged twenty-five, Wood was attending the Popular and Commercial Music course at Wakefield College, Yorkshire, England as a mature student. Here, he met two of the future Ultrasound members - Richard Green (a 16-year-old classical cellist) and drummer Andy Peace. Moving on to a music degree course in Newcastle, they encountered future Ultrasound bass player Vanessa Best.

Following a succession of brief-lived bands, Wood, Green and Peace teamed up with Wood's old ally Paul Hope. Joined by Hope's flute-playing wife Rachel Theresa, the five put together a psychedelic rock band called Sleepy People. For the next two years the band toured around the UK playing in various small venues around the UK and gaining underground attention. Wood, Green and Peace all appear on Sleepy People's 1994 cassette album Blunt Nails In A Sharp Wall (originally a cassette release, but reissued on CD in 1999 on ORG Records).

=== A proto-Ultrasound: Pop-A-Cat-A-Petal (1995–1996) ===
Tiny Wood and Richard Green left Sleepy People in 1995, taking keyboard player Pete Haslam with them. Moving to London, they formed a new progressive/art rock band, Pop-A-Cat-A-Petal, which began earning underground attention (in particular after supporting cult band Cardiacs). At this point, Green played bass (as he had in Sleepy People) and Wood doubled on guitar and harmonium as well as lead vocals. Andy Peace (who had left Sleepy People some time earlier than Wood, Green and Haslam) would also join Pop-A-Cat-A-Petal, replacing sometime drummer Steve Gilchrist.

Pop-A-Cat-A-Petal released a self-titled cassette EP on Org Records in 1995, but did not prosper. Wood was later to comment that the band "had a bit too much prog-rock about it." Vanessa Best (who had moved to London and was singing as a backing vocalist in a George Michael tribute band) was added to the Pop-A-Cat-A-Petal line-up as bass player, with Green moving to lead guitar. With the subsequent departure of Haslam, the band began to reduce their more obvious progressive rock influences in favour of a stronger element of 1970s glam rock and a more pronounced indie rock outlook. Circa 1996, Pop-A-Cat-A-Petal changed their name to Ultrasound.

=== Ultrasound rising (1996–1997) ===
Despite the more commercially acceptable developments of their sound, the renamed band was initially no more successful. Following a year of struggling to keep going (during which time Matt Jones was brought into the band on keyboards to expand the sound), Ultrasound released their first single "Same Band" on Fierce Panda in July 1997. It brought them some favourable press in NME, who described it as "(sounding) like The Who's Tommy - in its entirety - squeezed into four-and-a-half minutes... utterly heroic and bizarrely, by some distance, their most understated moment." This led to the band performing in the NME sponsored Unsigned Showcase event.

In turn, the Unsigned Showcase appearance led Ultrasound to a recording contract with Nude Records, following a bidding war between various record labels excited by the band's powerful live presence.

=== Nude Records period & Everything Picture (1998–1999) ===
The band's first two singles for Nude were "Best Wishes" and "Stay Young" (1998), the latter of which reached No. 30 in the UK Singles Chart. The band received favourable reviews for their recorded output, while receiving a good deal of press attention for their energetic live gigs, unusual appearance and determined outsider appeal. Wood, in particular, became a frequent interviewee and subject of attention in the British weekly music press, making a virtue of subjects usually avoided or discouraged in pop music discourse (such as his relative older age as a rock star debutante, his imposing physique, and his unfashionable enthusiasm for progressive rock). In October 2011, NME placed "Stay Young" at number 109 on its list "150 Best Tracks of the Past 15 Years".

The band compounded their 1998 success by playing a string of music festivals, culminating in a critically acclaimed performance at the Glastonbury Festival during a torrential downpour. One more single followed in October 1998, "I'll Show You Mine If You Show Me Yours" (about a relationship gone sour), and the band toured with Placebo.

During 1998, Ultrasound worked in the recording studio on their debut album, Everything Picture. The band released their fifth single, "Floodlit World" (a re-recording of a B-side from the "Same Band" single) in March 1999. It was both a Melody Maker 'Single of the Week' and a modest chart success reaching number 39.

Everything Picture was released in April 1999 as a double album CD, or triple vinyl, release. The album received poor reviews for its length and lack of focus. In spite of the negative critical response, Everything Picture reached number 23 in the UK Albums Chart. Ultrasound maintained their high media profile via a guest appearance at London Fashion Week, at which Wood contributed to the Red or Dead fashion house display by posing as a model, and flashing his substantial stomach (on which the word "Unique" had been scrawled in makeup). This particular opportunity gained an appearance on the front page of The Independent newspaper. Peace and Jones also carried out a naked catwalk streak, which was captured on live TV.

During the summer, the band cancelled a set of live dates during the festival season, including one at the T in the Park festival in Scotland, although they did fit in a second Glastonbury appearance. The album track "Aire & Calder" was selected as the next single, although the band clashed with record label Nude regarding the editing of the track for airplay. The single was not released.

=== Split and hiatus (1999–2009) ===
In the autumn of 1999, severe existing tensions within Ultrasound reached breaking point and Richard Green walked out on the band. With their main songwriter gone (and continuing dissension among the remaining members), the band foundered. Ultrasound officially split up on 12 October 1999.

While the other band members went their separate ways to pursue new projects, Tiny Wood remained in London and briefly attempted to reform Ultrasound with a new line-up. This included drummer Andy Peace, ex-Sleepy People bassist Bill Bailey, keyboard player Carly Graham and guitarist Adam Taylor. The new version of Ultrasound recorded an EP which never saw the light of day and performed their only live show at the Newcastle Arts Centre in the spring of 2000 but disbanded shortly afterwards due to the 5 members being located so far from one another. Wood returned to Newcastle and formed a new band called Siren with Carly Graham, Jayne Pearson, Leon Tighe and Pete Moffat. Wood also took on the role of lead singer in Blue Apple Boy (featuring his former Sleepy People bandmates) and performed on their album Salient (Soma Sound, 2002).

Matt Jones went on to form Minuteman, and subsequently played and performed with many musicians, including Black Crowes front-man Chris Robinson's New Earth Mud, Engineers, Iain Archer, Beth Rowley, Baxter Dury and Jamie T. He also wrote the music for the film Thespian X. Vanessa Best and Andy Peace formed The Sunshine Valley Dance Band with former Spiritualized/Slipstream guitarist Mark Refoy. Best also formed The Soulwinners with Mathew Priest and Andy Miller (both ex-Dodgy), with whom she continues to play. Alongside these projects Best qualified with a PGCE, spent time as the Assistant Director of Music at a comprehensive school in East London, and moved into music education management.

Meanwhile, estranged guitarist Richard Green had settled in Leeds and formed The Somatics (who released two albums). He would also contribute to Corinne Bailey Rae's 2010 album The Sea (providing guitar for the track "Paper Dolls") and provided a guitar solo to Blue Apple Boy's Salient.

=== Reunion and Play for Today (2010–2013) ===
In early 2010, Ultrasound were invited to reform for a benefit concert raising money for one of their key influences, Tim Smith of Cardiacs (who had suffered a debilitating heart attack and stroke in 2008). In March 2010, the five members of the band reunited at Vanessa Best's home in Shoreditch, London, ending a decade of estrangement. They subsequently agreed not only to play the concert but to reunite and write material for a new album. Ultrasound played a reunion concert at The Lexington in Kings Cross, London on 9 September 2010, playing mostly old material with two new tracks. A second concert took place the following night at The Brudenell Social Club in Leeds. Further concerts were planned for London in late September, followed by one on 8 October in Bradford.

December 2010 saw the first appearance of new Ultrasound recordings - a cover version of the Cardiacs song "Big Ship" which was included on Leader Of The Starry Skies: A Tribute To Tim Smith, Songbook 1, a fundraising compilation album to further benefit the hospitalised Tim Smith. In the same month, Matt Jones left the band for a second time (this time amicably), opting to continue as the touring keyboard player for Beady Eye as well as concentrate on other projects. He was replaced as Ultrasound's keyboard player by former New Mastersounds member Bob Birch.

Ultrasound's comeback single 'Welfare State/Sovereign' was released in August 2011 on Fierce Panda subsidiary Label Fandango. It was followed in 2012 by a second single, 'Beautiful Sadness', on Fierce Panda; the label would also release Ultrasound's second album Play for Today in September 2012. A second Play for Today single, 'Beautiful Sadness', also appeared in 2012; followed by a third, 'Between Two Rivers', in 2013.

=== Ultrasound today, including Real Britannia (2013–present) ===
Despite the departure of Andy Peace in 2013 (to be replaced by former Somatics drummer Bruce Renshaw), the remaining various Ultrasound members retained their commitment to the band; although without major label money and infrastructure available, band activity for the reformed Ultrasound was more intermittent than it had been during the 1990s. In December 2013, Ultrasound released a new non-album download-single, 'Modranicht', for the winter solstice. The video for the single was financed by long-term band fan and general practitioner Dr Philip M. Peverley.

In 2015, Peverly, along with fellow GP Dr Nicki Waldman, formed the record label Classic Album Club Records with the specific aim of releasing further music by Ultrasound (although the label would later sign the Manchester band Nihilists, featuring former Puressence singer James Mudriczski). Peverly and Waldman invited Ultrasound to make a third album, Real Britannia, which was recorded at only Factory Street Studios in Bradford throughout 2016 and was released in December 2016, with four-star reviews in Mojo, Uncut, Q and Prog Magazine.

The album was preceded in November 2016 by the "Kon-Tiki" single and by Ultrasound's triumphant return to the live scene at the Scala, London, in which the band played new songs from Real Britannia.

Following various delays and reschedulings relating to Covid-19 lockdowns, a twenty-first anniversary tour for Everything Picture was planned for the UK during summer 2021.

== Members ==
=== Current ===
- Andrew "Tiny" Wood – lead vocals, guitar, keyboards, synthesizer, banjo (1996-1999, 2010–present)
- Richard Green – guitars, keyboards, backing vocals (1996-1999, 2010–present)
- Vanessa Best – bass guitar, backing vocals, occasional lead vocals (1996-1999, 2010–present) (NB - Best has been credited as "Vanessa Wilson" since 2015)
- Bruce Renshaw – drums (2013–present)

=== Former ===
- Matt Jones – keyboards (1996-1999, 2010–2011)
- Andy Peace – drums (1996-1999, 2010–2013)
- Bob Birch – keyboards (2012–2013 - continues to contribute)

=== Touring ===
- Chris Duffin - keyboards

== Discography ==
=== Albums ===
- Everything Picture (1999)
- Play for Today (2012)
- Real Britannia (2016)

=== Singles ===
- "Same Band" (1997)
  - "Same Band"/"Floodlit World"/"Over There"
- "Best Wishes" (1998)
  - "Best Wishes"/"Kurt Russell"/"Black Hole"
- "Stay Young" (1998)
  - CD1: "Stay Young"/"Underwater Love Story"/"Can't Say No" CD2: "Stay Young"/"Football Meat"/"Hey Hey, My My (Into the Black)"
- "I'll Show You Mine" (1998)
  - "I'll Show You Mine"/"One Plus One"/"Final Solution"/"Lovesick"
- "Floodlit World" (1999)
  - CD1: "Floodlit World"/"Getting Better"/"Death of a Drag Racer" CD2: "Floodlit World"/"We Will Find Love" [demo]/"I'll Show You Mine" [video]
- "Aire & Calder" (1999, unreleased)
  - "Aire & Calder"/"Goodbye 25"/"Valencia"

=== EPs ===
- "Mayflower" (US, 1999)
  - "Stay Young"/"Best Wishes"/"Kurt Russell"/"Underwater Love Story"/"Can't Say No"

[This EP was also released in Europe as "Ultrasound Sing Five Songs for Europe"]
