= Weather girl =

Weather girl may refer to:

- Weather girl, an informal name for a woman weather presenter presenting weather forecast, usually via TV or radio, produced by meteorologists
- Weather Report Girl, a 1994 Japanese erotic anime
  - Weather Girl or Weather Woman (Otenki-oneesan), a 1996 live action film based on the anime, starring Kei Mizutani
- Weather Girl, a 2009 American comedy film
- Weather Girl, a 2024 comedic play
- Weather Girls, a Japanese idol group from Taiwan, or their 2013 debut album
- The Weather Girls, an American female musical duo
- The Weather Girl, City Hall Square, Copenhagen, Denmark
- The weather girl, a feature of the defunct Sydney Sun tabloid, see Page 3

== See also ==
- Weatherman (disambiguation)
- Weather (disambiguation)
