= So Young (Suede song) =

1993 single by Suede

Single by Suede

from the album Suede
- B-side: "High Rising"; "Dolly"
- Released: 17 May 1993
- Studio: Master Rock (London, England)
- Length: 3:38
- Label: Nude
- Songwriters: Brett Anderson; Bernard Butler
- Producer: Ed Buller

Suede singles chronology
"Animal Nitrate" (1993)	"So Young" (1993)	"Stay Together" (1994)

Music video
- "So Young" on YouTube

"So Young" is a song by English rock band Suede, released on 17 May 1993 through Nude Records as the fourth and final single from their self-titled debut album (1993). It charted at number 22 on the UK Singles Chart. "So Young" was a last-minute addition to the album. It was written just three months ahead of its release, in contrast to the bulk of the album, which had been demoed almost a year previously.

== Reception ==
Ian Gittins of Melody Maker called Suede's fourth single "yet more hilariously enunciated bodacious pop" from a band whose debut album is starting to attain the "feel of a Greatest Hits package." He added: it is "rampant with wit, invention and cocky joie de vivre." Simon Williams of NME considered the song a "highlight" of the album and of the band's recent live dates, notwithstanding its "crap drug references." He felt the quality of "High Rising" warrants the title track as the album's deserved fourth single. Martin Aston of Music Week called it an "absolute stunner" and the "stuff of which number one dreams are made."

== Music video ==
The music video for the single was directed by David Lewis and Andy Crabb, who later went on to direct a series of backdrop films for Suede as well as the live tour film Introducing The Band and features children from the Kent coastal town of Whitstable. Originally intended to have no footage of the band members, a shoot was later arranged at the instigation of the record company who insisted that the band appear.

== Track listings ==
All songs were written by Brett Anderson and Bernard Butler.

- 7-inch vinyl, cassette
1. "So Young"
2. "High Rising"
- 12-inch vinyl, CD
1. "So Young"
2. "Dolly"
3. "High Rising"

== Charts ==
Chart (1993)	Peak position
Australia (ARIA)	178
Europe (Eurochart Hot 100)	66
Israel (IBA)	7
UK Singles (OCC)	22
UK Airplay (Music Week)	19
UK Indie (Music Week)	1

== Release history ==
Region	Date	Format(s)	Label(s)	Ref.
United Kingdom	17 May 1993	7-inch vinyl; 12-inch vinyl; CD; cassette	Nude	
Japan	24 June 1993	CD	Nude	
Australia	16 August 1993	CD; cassette	Nude	
