= Pulse (Astrid Williamson album) =

Studio album by Astrid Williamson
- Released: 30 August 2011
- Label: One Little Indian
- Producer: Leo Abrahams

Astrid Williamson chronology
Here Come The Vikings (2009)	Pulse (2011)	We Go to Dream (2015)

Pulse is the fifth album from the Shetland-born singer-songwriter and musician Astrid Williamson. The album was produced by Leo Abrahams (a guitarist famed for his work with Brian Eno).

== Reception ==
Professional ratings
Review scores
Source	Rating
Scotsman On Sunday	9/10 stars
MusicOMH	8/10 stars
Popmatters	6/10 stars

Pulse was judged by MusicOMH to be a "bold change in direction....pulled off extremely competently". The Scotsman newspaper suggested the "lilting conversational beauty of [the track] "Paperbacks" - up there with Joni Mitchell's best moments". Popmatters viewed it as "less a game-changer than a paradigm shift", while UNCUT magazine concluded it is "as beautiful as it is unsettling".

== Track listing ==
1. Dance
2. Pour
3. Underwater
4. Cherry
5. Miracle
6. Connected
7. Pulse
8. Husk
9. Reservation
10. Paperbacks

== Personnel and recording details ==
- Astrid Williamson - vocals / guitar / harp / piano and handclaps
- Leo Abrahams - bass / drums / electric guitar / bells / keyboards and tambourine
- Programming, mixing and production by Leo Abrahams
- Mastered by Mandy Parnell
- Photography by Rankin
- Artwork by Joby Barnard
- All songs composed by Astrid Williamson
