= Into the Mountain =

Studio album by Astrid Williamson
- Released: 18 February 2022
- Studio: Black Shed Studios, London; Echo Zoo Studios, Eastbourne; Willow Crescent Studios, Warragul, Australia; Le Puits Sonore, Marseille. France; Abbey Road Studios, London
- Label: Incarnation Records
- Producer: Andy Glen

Astrid Williamson chronology
| Requiem & Gallipoli (2015) | Into the Mountain (2022) |

Into the Mountain is the eighth studio album by Astrid Williamson, released on 18 February 2022 on Incarnation Records. Williamson created the album's songs from a cache of poetry sand writing she discovered on a computer hard drive.

== Critical reception ==
Professional ratings
Review scores
| Source | Rating |
|---|---|
| PopMatters | 8/10 |
| The Scotsman | 3/5 stars |
| Uncut | 7/10 |

PopMatters praised "the honed songwriting, the textures, the storytelling and the heaven bound, singular voice" with The Scotsman saying "the rolling drums, windswept strings and incantatory vocals whip up an atmospheric folk pop storm". Uncut stated that "it taps feelings of regret, loss, yearning & desire but acceptance too".

== Track listing ==
All songs are written by Astrid Williamson.

1. "Coming Up for Air" – 3:36
2. "In Gratitude" – 5:20
3. "Eat" – 3:14
4. "June Bug" – 6:03
5. "Body" – 3:58
6. "For Henry" – 4:26
7. "Prague" – 3:57
8. "Corsica" – 6:01
9. "Gun" – 5:26
10. "There Are Words" – 3:11

== Personnel ==
- Astrid Williamson – vocals, synthesisers, piano, xylophone, guitar, organ, programming & string arrangements
- Andy Glen – guitar, percussion, e-bow, string arrangements, backing vocals
- Martyn Barker – drums & percussion
- Nicolas Dick – lap steel guitar
- Richard Yale – bass guitar
- Ruth Gottlieb – violin

Production

- Andy Glen – producer
- Tula Parker – artwork
