= Day of the Lone Wolf =

Studio album by Astrid Williamson
- Released: 1 May 2006
- Length: 47:07
- Label: One Little Indian

Astrid Williamson chronology
Carnation / Astrid (2003)	Day of the Lone Wolf (2006)	Here Come The Vikings (2009)

Day of the Lone Wolf is the third album from singer-songwriter Astrid Williamson which she also produced. The album title refers to the date of her birth (28 November), which is known as the Day of the Lone Wolf in the astrological book, The Secret Language Of Birthdays.

== Reception ==
Professional ratings
Review scores
Source	Rating
The Skinny	3/5 stars
Guardian	4/5 stars

The Guardian suggested that the album was 'oozes song-writing class..... (with) brave and powerful confessionals' with The Skinny noting a "haunting quality hanging over the album".

== Track listing ==
1. Siamese
2. Superman 2
3. Intro
4. Reach
5. Amarylis
6. True Romance
7. Carlotta
8. Shhh...
9. Tonight
10. Another Twisted Thing
11. Forgive Me
12. Only Heaven Knows

== Personnel ==
- Astrid Williamson - vocals, guitar, organ, piano, synth, Wurlitzer, string arrangements
- Richard Yale - bass guitar
- Simon Pearson - drums
- Ruth Gottlieb - violin
- Neil Evans - guitar
- Mark Treffel - organ
- Sarah Wilson - cello
- Christian Parsons - drums and percussion
- Dan Burke - guitar and organ
- Written, arranged and produced by Astrid Williamson
