= Geneva (band) =

British alternative rock band

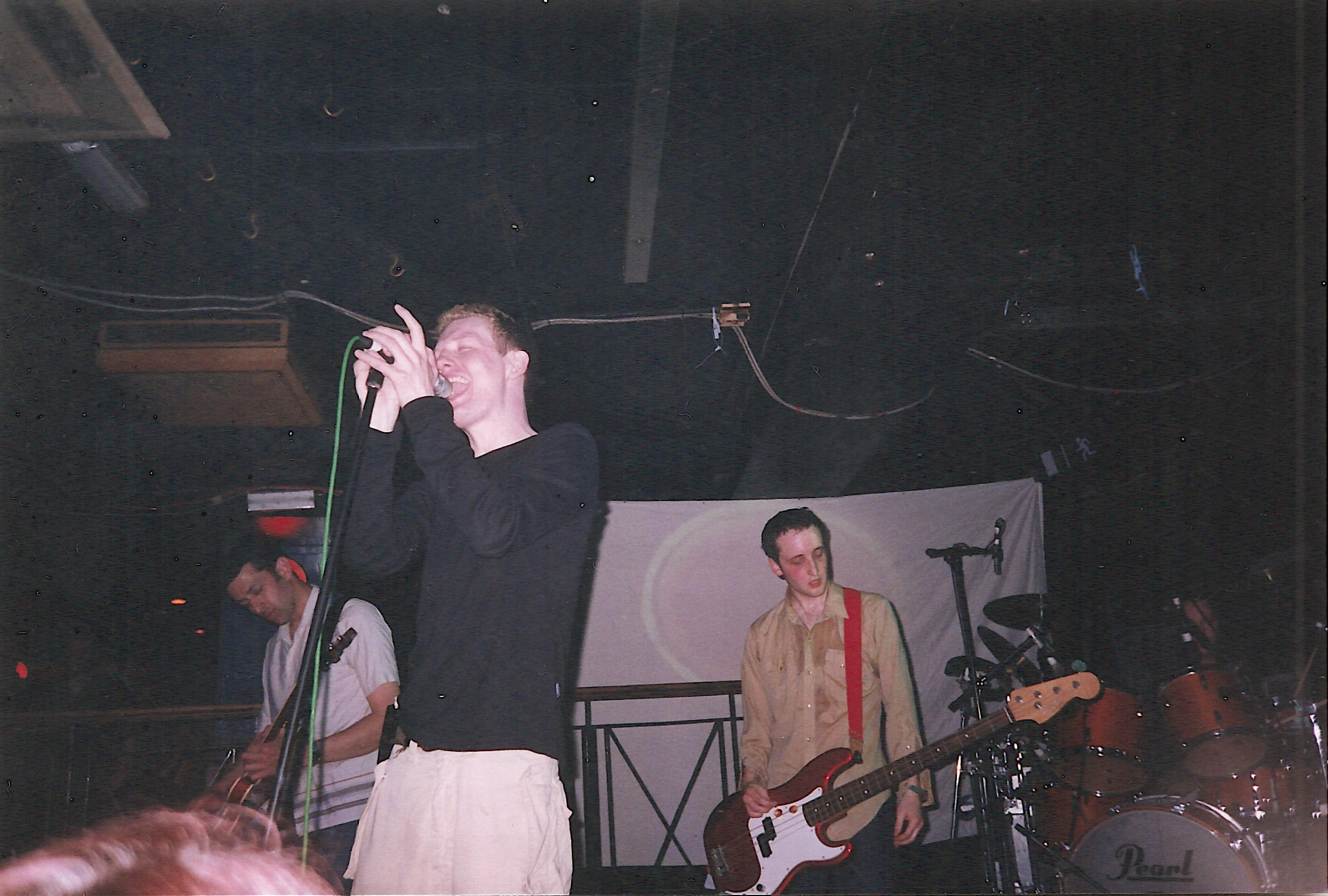
- Geneva live in 2000

Background information
- Origin: Aberdeen, Scotland
- Genres: Alternative rock, art rock, indie rock, indie pop, Britpop
- Years active: 1992–2000, 2018–present
- Label: Nude Records
- Members: Andrew Montgomery; Steven Dora; Keith Graham; Douglas Caskie
- Past members: Stuart Evans
- Website: Official site

Geneva are a Scottish rock band formed in Aberdeen in 1992. The group enjoyed moderate chart success but split after the release of their second album. They reformed in 2018, minus guitarist Stuart Evans, in preparation for a live tour in 2019.

== Career ==
The band were formed in 1992 by vocalist Andrew Montgomery and guitarist Steven Dora. They recruited second guitarist Stuart Evans, bass player Keith Graham and finally drummer Craig Brown. Craig was later replaced by Douglas Caskie. Originally the band were called Sunfish.

One of their demos found their way to Suede’s record label, Nude, who signed the band in 1996. The band changed their name, originally to Garland, then later to Geneva, and released their debut single "No One Speaks" the same year. The band garnered enough press to headline NME's annual Bratbus tour of up and coming bands in early 1997. The band released second single "Into the Blue" to coincide with the tour.

== Musical style ==
The band fitted well with the current musical scene and were well promoted by the UK music press of the time. As a reaction to the fading Britpop scene many bands rejected the laddish ideals of bands like Oasis and wrote darker, more intelligent songs, in the vein of contemporaries such as Gene and Strangelove. Montgomery's relatively high-pitched vocals were often compared to Suede's Brett Anderson.

== Albums ==
Geneva released their debut album, Further, early in June 1997. The album mixed power pop with darker brooding songs. It reached No. 20 in the UK Albums Chart, and included amongst others the NME voted "Single of the Year", "Tranquilizer", plus "Best Regrets", "No One Speaks" and "Into the Blue". All four singles from the album reached the UK Top 40.

The second album, Weather Underground, was released in March 2000, after more than a year of wrangling with the band's record label. It was preceded by the single "Dollars in the Heavens" (which only made the UK Top 60) and followed by the single "If You Have To Go". The band split later that year.

== Post-Geneva careers ==
Following the breakup of Geneva, Evans and Graham formed 69CORP and released an album, Our Present to the Future in 2005, although 69CORP now consists of just Graham.

Andrew Montgomery embarked on a number of musical collaborations, most notably with American composer Ben Neill and Leeds electronica guru Overseer. Montgomery formed a band called Amityville with guitarist Stuart Peck and drummer David Bevis; they released the Pacific Radio Fire EP in 2004 to critical acclaim - a limited release, it quickly sold out. Amityville broke up in late 2005 and Montgomery formed a duo with Keris Howard called St Famous. In March 2009 Montgomery announced on the band's Myspace page that Keris Howard had decided to leave the band and St Famous disbanded.

Montgomery appeared in the "Identity Parade" in series 22 (2008) of the BBC television programme Never Mind the Buzzcocks.

Montgomery announced in July 2014 that his début solo album, Ruled By Dreams would receive a worldwide release on 5 October 2014, supported with a UK tour. The album is slated to feature Suede guitarist Richard Oakes and Norwegian singer Kate Havnevik and was produced and co-written with Britney Spears, Robyn, Frou Frou and Alison Moyet collaborator Sean McGhee. Andrew then went on to join an electronic duo called Unify Separate (Us) for a few songs and a tour. As of 2018 they have reunited for the Star Shaped Festival tour and have teased they may be releasing new music.

== Discography ==
Geneva discography
- Studio albums: 2
- Singles: 8

=== Studio albums ===
Year	Title	Chart Positions
Year	Title	UK Albums Chart
1997	Further: Released: 9 June 1997; Labels: Nude Records, Work	20
2000	Weather Underground: Released: 6 March 2000; Labels: Nude Records	117

=== Singles ===
Year	Song	UK Singles Chart	Album
1996	"No One Speaks"	32	Further
1997	"Into the Blue"	26	Further
1997	"Tranquillizer"	24	Further
1997	"Best Regrets"	38	Further
1999	"Dollars in the Heavens"	59	Weather Underground
2000	"If You Have to Go"	69	Weather Underground
2000	"Cassie" / "Have You Seen the Horizon Lately?" (Promo)	–	Weather Underground
2000	Musecone 1 (Promo)	–	Weather Underground
2020	"Fault Lines"	–	
