= Weekender (Flowered Up song) =

Single by Flowered Up
- A-side: "Weekender"
- Released: 20 April 1992
- Genre: Baggy
- Length: 12:53
- Label: Heavenly
- Producer: Clive Langer

Flowered Up singles chronology
"It's On" / "Egg Rush" (1991)	"Weekender" (1992)	"Don't Talk Just Kiss" (1992)

"Weekender" is a song by English indie pop-alternative dance band Flowered Up. The band had performed the song as early as 1991. The song has been described as denouncing people who only go to clubs on the weekend and advocating a party-all-the-time philosophy of the group. The group originally wanted it to be released through their label at that time, London Records. The single was turned down by London Records and released later on 20 April 1992 by Heavenly Recordings.

"Weekender" charted in the United Kingdom for five weeks, peaking at number 20 on the charts. The song received positive reviews on its initial release and was later referred to by The Guardian as the group's masterpiece.

== Background and production ==
London Records dropped Flowered Up a few months after the release of their album A Life With Brian when they refused to release their 12 minute long single for "Weekender". The song was released by Heavenly Recordings and produced by Clive Langer. Jeff Barrett, owner of Heavenly Recordings stated that "Weekender" came from the group's "love of drugs and Pink Floyd."

== Style and theme ==
Heather Phares of AllMusic described "Weekender" as denouncing "weekend club-goers" and "advocating a party-all-the-time philosophy that distilled Flowered Up's appeal and ultimate downfall." The song opens and closes with dialogue samples from the film Quadrophenia, which Simon Reynolds described as their "rave-as-mod" analogy. The samples include part of Jimmy's resignation speech, where he tells Fulford to shove "that mail and that franking machine and all that other rubbish I have to go about with" up his arse.

== Release ==
The "Weekender" single was released by Heavenly Recordings on 20 April 1992. A second 12" featured two mostly instrumental remixes by Andrew Weatherall, both even longer than the original song. The song charted on the UK Singles Chart for five weeks, where it peaked at number 20.

=== Video ===
An 18 minute 20 second video was released for the song directed by W.I.Z. and starring Lee Whitlock. The video features imagery of scooters, bath tubs, girls and supermarket check outs and has a narrative involving clubbing fuelled by ecstasy.

== Documentary ==
In 2023, a documentary film was released, directed by Chloé Raunet, titled I Am Weekender, about the video for "Weekender", exploring its making, impact, and wider cultural legacy.

== Reception ==
AllMusic and The Guardian stated that the single was released to critical acclaim. In a review of a live performance of the group in 1991, The Guardian described the song as a "shockingly vitriolic new song". Select described the single as "variously a smart and beady-eyed pop tune, a god-awful heap of retro garbage and a perplexing aural hallucination." The review concluded that it could not be considered in the running for "Single of the Month" as the track was too long.

In Richard Luck's guide book The Madchester Scene: The Pocket Essential Guide, Luck described the song as a "breathtaking, hazy ode to 48 hour party people" and that without the song "we would not be talking about [Flowered Up]". Spin mentioned "Weekender" in their discussion of Essential Madchester releases, stating that it was "an epic account of ravings highs and lows". The Guardian later referred to the song as the group's masterpiece.

Writing for Freaky Trigger in 1999, critic Tom Ewing ranked the song at number 69 in his list of the "Top 100 Singles of the 90s", saying "'Weekender' is an aggressive, unique record, a record that doesn't want to be made sense of, a surly epic existing to tell you just that no matter what you'll read about 1992 in some future pop textbook, it wasn't like that, wasn't nearly so neat."

== Track listing ==
UK 1-sided 12" / CD single / cassette single
No.	Title	Writer(s)	Length
1.	"Weekender"	Flowered Up	12:53

Remix 12" ("Weatherall's Weekender")
No.	Title	Writer(s)	Length
1.	"Weekender (Audrey is a Little Bit Partial Mix)"	Flowered Up	15:30
2.	"Weekender (Audrey is a Little Bit More Partial Mix)"	Flowered Up	17:10

== Charts ==
Chart (1992)	Peak position
UK Singles (OCC)	20
UK Dance (Music Week)	11

== See also ==
- 1992 in British music
- Heavenly Recordings discography
- Music of the United Kingdom (1990s)
