= Suede (album) =

Studio album by Suede
- Released: 29 March 1993
- Recorded: 1992–1993
- Studios: Protocol, London; Angel, London; Master Rock, London
- Genres: Britpop; alternative rock; glam rock
- Length: 45:36
- Label: Nude
- Producer: Ed Buller

Suede chronology
Suede (1993)	Dog Man Star (1994)

Singles from Suede
- 1. "The Drowners" Released: 11 May 1992; 2. "Metal Mickey" Released: 14 September 1992; 3. "Animal Nitrate" Released: 22 February 1993; 4. "So Young" Released: 17 May 1993

Suede is the debut studio album by the English alternative rock band Suede, released in March 1993 on Nude Records. It was recorded in London at Master Rock studios in late 1992 and early 1993 and was produced by Ed Buller. At the time the fastest-selling debut album in British history in almost a decade, Suede debuted at the top of the UK Albums Chart, won the 1993 Mercury Music Prize, and is often cited as one of the first Britpop records. Displaying a sound of Britishness and glam rock, its music and lyrical content has been compared to the Smiths and early David Bowie.

The album was preceded by what Rolling Stone called "its triptych of instantly classic singles." The three singles, "The Drowners", "Metal Mickey" and "Animal Nitrate" helped to create a media buzz leading to significant hype for a year leading up to the album's release. It was met with generally favourable reviews both in the UK and in the US. Although it remains the group's biggest-selling album in the US, it struggled to make headway commercially compared to the success in the UK. In 2013, NME placed the album at number 78 in its list of the 500 greatest albums of all time.

== Background and recording ==
Suede quickly attracted the attention of the British music press; in 1992 before they had even released their debut single, Melody Maker featured the band on its cover, dubbing them "The Best New Band in Britain." The year leading up to the release of Suede saw the group dominate the music press, appearing on 19 magazine covers; and unprecedented for a band who had yet to release an album, an appearance on the cover of Q magazine in February 1993, declaring them "The Band of 1993". According to a March 1993 article in The Independent, at the time Suede "had more hype than anybody since the Smiths, or possibly even the Sex Pistols."

The record was produced by Ed Buller who the band had met through Nude Records' owner Saul Galpern. Both had worked together at Island Records. The band chose to work with Buller not based on his CV but more on a collective liking of him based on a shared interest of music they liked growing up. The band felt that this mutual interest would help shape their musical direction. Lead singer Brett Anderson said: "It wasn't so much us attaching ourselves to his CV, it was more kind of like where we were going to go with [the band]." In terms of writing for the album, Anderson said they had a structural way of doing it. Guitarist Bernard Butler would write guitar parts and melodies mostly on his own. He would then play these in the rehearsal room with bassist Mat Osman and drummer Simon Gilbert playing along. Anderson would then create vocal lines, which he would work on at home changing them to lyrics. These early recordings were done on a cassette recorder rather than a 4-track recorder. 4-track recorders would later be used during recording sessions for the album. During the early recordings, Butler said he was never fully aware of what lyrics Anderson was actually singing in rehearsals or at gigs until much later on. He was more focused on the melodies he was writing himself, saying: "I just always had the feeling that, if he's happy, I'm happy... if it's working, it's working and just go with it."

Once the band had signed long-term to Nude/Sony in November 1992, the band began official recording of the album. The album was recorded late 1992 and early 1993 and cost £105,000 to make. Some tracks were recorded at Protocol and Angel Recording Studios, though the bulk of the album was recorded and mixed at Master Rock Studios as Buller got on well with the house engineer Gary Stout. In the studio, Buller's method of working was that he would form a close relationship with the band member whom he thought to be most important for the sound and creative input. In Suede's case it was guitarist Butler, which did not go down well with Anderson. Buller would be the band's closest musical collaborator for the years ahead. Anderson liked Buller as a person and for his enthusiasm for Suede. He endorsed his production on the first single "The Drowners"; however, he had different views on "Metal Mickey", feeling that Buller took the "metal brutality" out of the song. Instead of the song ending abruptly after the chorus, which the band demonstrated when performing live, Buller suggested an extended fade-out, which incorporated a key change.

Anderson also had an issue with the song "Moving", saying "It never sounds as good on that album as it did live. There's hardly anything of the energy, it's over-produced, it's all a bit FX, it's a bit grim." Butler would eventually clash with Buller for similar reasons during the recording of the next album, which was an event Anderson could perceive early on. "I think as Bernard got more technically aware, because he always had a fine ear, he very soon saw flaws in what Ed was doing.

Inspired by The Smiths, Suede wanted to ensure the b-sides were of a high standard. Anderson later expressed regret for relegating several tracks recorded in sessions for the singles and album to B-sides. The later album recordings included "She's Not Dead", "The Next Life", "So Young" and "Breakdown"; the latter track being the last to be written.

== Music ==
Nick Wise views the whole album in terms of Butler and Anderson constantly trying to outperform each other, thereby producing "a pot-pourri of swirling guitars, falsetto wails and surging amplification that somehow succeeds in producing a giddy, weird, beautiful soundclash". In Suede's early days when Justine Frischmann was still a member and was dating Blur's Damon Albarn, the lyrics of her ex-partner Anderson were conveying a more depressing meaning. He has noted that the songs "Pantomime Horse" and B-side "He's Dead" were the product of an unhappy mind and that he could not have written such songs if he had been happy. Anderson states, "when it comes to writing, there's something to be said about being unhappy. I know I've been at my most creative when I've been sexually unsatisfied."

"London was a touchstone for everyone in the band, so the album became about us being placed in this city of sex, drugs and poverty after living in these suburban satellite towns. London is full of a certain kind of arts professional—people in bands whose parents bought them guitars when they were 12 and went to state school. The sense in all of us was that we wanted to get revenge on all that as the underclass outsider punks. We wanted Suede to be a pop record in the way that The Pretenders' "Stop Your Sobbing" is a pop record."

— Mat Osman reflecting on Suede.

Suede's breakthrough single in the UK was "Metal Mickey". According to Anderson, the song was inspired by Daisy Chainsaw vocalist KatieJane Garside. Butler has noted that its musical inspiration was "The Shoop Shoop Song", famously remade by Cher. Anderson wrote "Sleeping Pills" whilst doing voluntary work at a local community centre in Highgate. It was inspired by the daily drama of the British housewives and their dependence on valium as a means of escapism. At the time he felt that the song's lyrics were more sophisticated than "Animal Nitrate", which he thought were "a bit throw-away." The band were determined to release "Sleeping Pills" as the third single, but were soon over-ruled by Nude Records' owner Saul Galpern, who suggested the former instead.

"Animal Nitrate", a play on amyl nitrite, contained Anderson's most risqué lyrics to date: as their author concurred, "You know it's about violence and abuse and sex and drugs. It's actually quite a hardcore song." Anderson has since said that the first album was about "sex and depression in equal measure". All the latter-day lyrics for the first album were directly influenced by extremely personal and emotional experiences in Anderson's life. "So Young", featuring a piano bridge courtesy of Ed Buller, was about his girlfriend's overdose. Anderson says: "it deals with the knife-edge of being young." "The Next Life", which was Butler's first serious piano part, was a lament to Anderson's deceased mother, while "Breakdown" dealt with his schoolfriend's descent into extreme depression. "She's Not Dead", was a true story written about the joint suicide of Anderson's aunt and her black clandestine lover. On the song, Anderson states: "the ankle chain and stuff like that, is the kind of detail that can only come from truth, that can't be conjured up."

On the other hand, Anderson has elsewhere stressed that the songs are not autobiographical, but "often imaginary situations based on real sentiments, or real situations taken to their logical extreme". When asked about the pervasive use of the word "he" in his songs, Anderson stated that "too much music is about a very straightforward sense of sexuality ... Twisted sexuality is the only kind that interests me. The people that matter in music ... don't declare their sexuality. Morrissey never has and he's all the more interesting for that".

== Title and artwork ==
Before the album was released, the band half seriously considered titles of Half Dog, Animal Lover, and I Think You Stink, all were rejected in favour of Suede. The gender-ambiguous cover art provoked some controversy in the press, prompting Anderson to comment: "I chose it because of the ambiguity of it, but mostly because of the beauty of it." The cover image of the androgynous kissing couple was taken from the 1991 book Stolen Glances: Lesbians Take Photographs edited by Tessa Boffin and Jean Fraser. The photograph was taken by Tee Corinne and in its entirety shows a woman kissing an acquaintance in a wheelchair. Corinne had in fact turned down the band's request to use the full shot of the two naked women and insisted they could only use a head and shoulders close-up of the women to protect their identity.

== Release ==
Suede was released in the UK 29 March 1993 on vinyl, MC and CD. It opened at the top of the UK Albums Chart, becoming the fastest-selling debut album since Frankie Goes to Hollywood's Welcome to the Pleasuredome almost ten years earlier. The album qualified for a gold disc on advanced orders alone, going gold at 10am on the second day of release. It was outselling its nearest rival, Depeche Mode's Songs of Faith and Devotion, by a margin of nearly four to one. It was released worldwide 6 April. "Metal Mickey" was the first single chosen for the American market, going to radio 22 March. The album was released by Columbia Records in the U.S., where it entered the Heatseekers Album Chart in June for a five-week run. In Europe, Sony issued a special introduction EP containing the first two UK singles, "The Drowners" and "Metal Mickey". Three singles had already been released in the UK. "The Drowners" charting at no. 49, "Metal Mickey" at no. 17, and 5 weeks before the release of the album, Suede's first top-ten hit "Animal Nitrate" peaked at no. 7 on the UK Singles Chart. Ten weeks after its release the album had reported sales of over 160,000 in the UK; 60,000 in the U.S., and 45,000 in Japan.

=== Reissues ===
In June 2011, Suede released remastered and expanded editions of their previous five studio albums. Released in chronological order each week. The expanded version includes the original 11 tracks remastered. Additional bonus material includes demos, all b-sides from the singles released from the album and two unreleased songs. The DVD features the promotional videos for the singles including the US version of "The Drowners" and the band's "Animal Nitrate" performance at the 1993 Brit Awards. The DVD includes two full live sets the band played in 1993; The February appearance at the Sheffield Leadmill and the May show at Brixton Academy. The latter known as Love and Poison, previously released on VHS in 1993. Bonus features include a 2011 interview with Brett Anderson and Bernard Butler discussing the writing of the album. The reissue charted at no. 74 in the UK Albums Chart.

The album was reissued again in 2018 as a 25th anniversary edition. For its 30th anniversary, the album received a new mix in stereo and surround sound by musician, producer, and Porcupine Tree frontman Steven Wilson, to be issued in several formats, along with a new remaster from the original master tapes. The multitrack tape from the track "Breakdown" could not be located for the new mixes.

== Critical reception ==
Professional ratings
Review scores
Source	Rating
AllMusic	5/5 stars
Entertainment Weekly	B+
The Irish Times	5/5 stars
Mojo	5/5 stars
NME	7/10
Pitchfork	8.4/10
Q	4/5 stars
Rolling Stone	4/5 stars
Rolling Stone Album Guide	4/5 stars
Select	4/5
The Village Voice	A−

The album itself received generally positive reviews by the UK critics, Keith Cameron of the NME compared Suede to The Smiths; he wrote, "'Suede' faces the same problems [as The Smiths did] and similarly fails to deliver on a few, admittedly trifling, levels". However, he concluded, "This is the solid, quality, ring-of-confidence debut [Nude Records] dreamed the band would produce". Stuart Maconie of Q drew comparisons to Bowie, Morrissey and Marr. In conclusion he said "Bowie and the Smiths are obvious points of reference. From each, Suede have taken an alien sexual charisma, a peculiarly claustrophobic Englishness and brazenly good tunes. Moreover, rarely has a record from the indie sector come with such a burning sense of its own significance." In Select, Steve Lamacq noted "a feeling in the air that they haven't fully let themselves go yet", concluding: "As debuts go this isn't exactly Suede in flames: but what a smouldering attempt." Ben Thompson of The Independent wrote that "it would be a shame if the eagerness to get the backlash underway stopped their excellent album getting the respect it deserves."

The album was warmly received by most American critics. Robert Christgau called it a "surprisingly well-crafted coming out. More popwise and also more literary than the Smiths at a comparable stage, Suede's collective genderfuck projects a joyful defiance so rock and roll it obliterates all niggles about literal truth." In his review for The Baltimore Sun, J. D. Considine felt that Suede had lived up to the hype they had received in the UK. He added: "the group's greatest strengths are strictly melodic, thanks to the consistently tuneful interplay between Brett Anderson's voice and Bernard Butler's guitar. As such, it's impossible to come away from the album without humming snatches of the slow-and-dreamy 'Sleeping Pills,' the dark, punchy 'The Drowners,' or the intoxicatingly catchy 'Animal Nitrate'." David Fricke of Rolling Stone gave a very positive review, saying: "Suede the band and Suede the record are more than the sum of their brilliantly packaged designer hauteur. There is an undercurrent of doomsday urgency in Anderson's feigned languor, tartly echoed in Bernard Butler's corrosive guitar work." He wrote a very positive assessment of most tracks on the album, with one exception: "there are two 'Animal' songs on the album, of which 'Animal Lover' is one too many." In conclusion, he said: "No matter; they've made the best of this one." In a more mixed review, Lorraine Ali of the Los Angeles Times felt the band "do their best to alienate the common listener." She wrote: "When not pretending to be superhuman, Suede churns out strong songs--a couple of fun, post-punk, power-pop tunes among them. But mostly the band oozes alluring, tousled and sexy songs over sometimes steamy lyrics or weaves sad and opiated melodies around Anderson’s shooting highs and desperate lows."

The album featured in the top ten end-of-year best-of lists of NME, Select, Melody Maker, The Face, OOR and Eye Weekly.

== Commercial performance ==
The album charted at no. 1 in the UK Albums Chart, selling more than 100,000 copies in the first week. It spent 11 weeks in the top 40. In March 1993 the British Phonographic Industry has certified the album as gold. By September 1994, UK sales were 220,000 and sales outside the UK were around 400,000, with the largest markets being Japan (69,000), Germany (42,000), Sweden (39,000) and France (37,000). Three weeks after entering the chart, it peaked at no. 14 on the US Heatseekers Albums Chart on 26 June 1993. It also charted at no. 8 on the European Top 100 Albums chart, staying there for 16 weeks. As of September 2020, the album has sold 301,000 copies in the UK, according to the Official Charts Company. Suede is the group's best-selling album in the United States, having sold about 105,000 copies as of September 2008, according to Nielsen SoundScan. Much of the total album sales in the UK consisted of the initial rush during the first few weeks. As of September 2019, of all the Mercury Prize winning albums, Suede is the 16th best-selling out of 27; despite being one of only three chart-topping albums on the list. The other two number ones, Arctic Monkeys' debut and Pulp's Different Class are the top-two best-selling Mercury Prize winners.

== Legacy and influence ==
Suede's debut album is regarded by critics as a defining album of the Britpop era, and is often credited for starting Britpop. While most critics consider follow-up album Dog Man Star as the band's best work, there are a few who have recognised the first album as their finest moment. Reviewing the 2011 reissue, Kevin Courtney of The Irish Times spoke of the strength of Suede's early singles. Rating it above Dog Man Star, which he felt was "too fragmented and flawed to be their masterpiece." Likewise, with similar views, David Edwards of Drowned in Sound rated the reissue ten out of ten, and opined that "although Dog Man Star arguably contains more individually brilliant moments, there is a serious case for referring to their 1993 debut as overall, being their most complete realisation."

Many of the artists who have cited the band as an influence have spoken directly of how the band's first album was an influence. Notable artists are Kate Jackson of English indie rock band the Long Blondes, and American indie rock band Drowners, who took their name from Suede's single of the same name.

=== Accolades ===
Publication	Country	Accolade	Year	Rank
Robert Dimery	UK	1001 Albums You Must Hear Before You Die	2005	411
Alternative Press	US	Top 99 of '85 to '95	1995	94
Attitude	UK	Top 50 Gay Albums of All Time	unknown	27
Flavorwire	US	30 Essential LGBT albums	2013	*
Kitsap Sun	US	Top 200 Albums of the Last 40 Years	2005	176
Melody Maker	UK	All Time Top 100 Albums	2000	47
NME	UK	The 100 Greatest British Albums Ever	2006	30
NME	UK	The 500 Greatest Albums of All Time	2013	78
Pitchfork	US	The 50 Best Britpop Albums	2017	13
Q	UK	Readers' All Time Top 100 Albums	1998	60
Q	UK	250 best albums of Q's lifetime	2011	116
Select	UK	The 100 Best Albums of the 90's	1996	89
Uncut	UK	The 100 Greatest Debut Albums	2006	99
Colin Larkin	UK	All Time Top 1000 Albums	1998	96
Yedioth Ahronoth	Israel	Top 99 Albums of All Time	1999	44

(*) designates unordered lists.

== Track listing ==
All tracks are written by Brett Anderson and Bernard Butler.

No.	Title	Length
1.	"So Young"	3:38
2.	"Animal Nitrate"	3:27
3.	"She's Not Dead"	4:33
4.	"Moving"	2:50
5.	"Pantomime Horse"	5:49
6.	"The Drowners"	4:10
7.	"Sleeping Pills"	3:51
8.	"Breakdown"	6:02
9.	"Metal Mickey"	3:27
10.	"Animal Lover"	4:17
11.	"The Next Life"	3:32

=== 2011 remastered and expanded version ===
Disc one: demos
No.	Title	Length
12.	"The Drowners" (Rocking Horse demo)	3:59
13.	"Metal Mickey" (Island demo)	2:38
14.	"Pantomime Horse" (Island demo)	5:39
15.	"He's Dead" (Rocking Horse demo)	4:11
16.	"Moving" (Rocking Horse demo)	3:01
17.	"To the Birds" (Rocking Horse demo)	5:18
18.	"Sleeping Pills" (East West demo)	3:55

Disc two: B-sides and extra tracks
No.	Title	Writer(s)	Length
1.	"My Insatiable One"		2:57
2.	"To the Birds"		5:25
3.	"He's Dead"		5:13
4.	"Where the Pigs Don't Fly"		5:35
5.	"Painted People"		2:50
6.	"The Big Time"		4:28
7.	"High Rising"		5:57
8.	"Dolly"		2:44
9.	"My Insatiable One" (piano version)		2:47
10.	"Brass in Pocket"	Chrissie Hynde, James Honeyman-Scott	4:17
11.	"Diesel (Instrumental)" (previously unreleased studio outtake)	Butler	3:56
12.	"Stars on 45" (previously unreleased rehearsal room recording)		2:31
13.	"Just a Girl" (early demo; featuring Justine Frischmann)	Anderson	3:01
14.	"Sleeping Pills (strings)"		1:16

DVD
No.	Title	Length
1.	"The Drowners"	3:48
2.	"Metal Mickey"	3:36
3.	"Animal Nitrate"	3:24
4.	"So Young"	3:40
5.	"The Drowners" (US version)	3:49
6.	"Animal Nitrate" (The Brit Awards – Alexandra Palace, 16 February 1993)	3:25
7.	"Live at The Leadmill - Sheffield, 27 February 1993"	42:02
8.	"Love and Poison - Live at Brixton Academy, 16 May 1993"	57:02
9.	"Brett Anderson and Bernard Butler 2011 Interview"	26:23

== Personnel ==
Suede

- Bernard Butler – guitar, piano
- Brett Anderson – vocals
- Mat Osman – bass guitar
- Simon Gilbert – drums

Additional musicians

- Phil Overhead – percussion
- Simon Clarke – baritone saxophone, tenor saxophone
- Ed Buller – keyboards, synthesiser
- Trevor Burley – cello
- Lynne Baker – viola
- Caroline Barnes – violin
- Shelley Van Loen – violin
- John Buller – string arrangement on "Sleeping Pills"
- Suzanne Bramson – session co-ordination

Technical

- Ed Buller – production, engineering
- Gary Stout – assistance

Design

- Tee Corinne – photography
- Pennie Smith – portraits
- Pat Pope – portraits
- Peter Barrett – sleeve design
- Andrew Biscomb – sleeve design

== Charts and certifications ==
=== Original album weekly charts ===
Charts (1993)	Peak Position
Australian Albums Chart	23
Canadian Albums Chart	73
European Top 100 Albums	8
Finnish Charts	12
French Albums Chart	34
German Albums Chart	50
Japanese Albums Chart	31
New Zealand Albums Chart	8
Netherlands Albums Chart	77
Norwegian Albums Chart	18
Swedish Albums Chart	7
Swiss Albums Chart	37
UK Albums Chart	1
US Heatseekers Albums Chart	14

=== Certifications ===
Region	Certification	Certified units/sales
Sweden (GLF)	Gold	50,000^{^}
United Kingdom (BPI)	Gold	100,000^{^}
^{^} Shipments figures based on certification alone.
