= We Go to Dream =

We Go To Dream

Studio album by Astrid Williamson
- Released: 31 July 2015
- Label: One Little Indian

Astrid Williamson chronology
Pulse (2011)	We Go To Dream (2015)	Requiem & Gallipoli (2015)

We Go to Dream is the sixth album by singer-songwriter Astrid Williamson.

== Critical reception ==
Professional ratings
Review scores
Source	Rating
Popmatters	8/10 stars
Femme Metal Zine	8/10 stars
God Is In The Tv Zine	3/5 stars

Popmatters thought there was "a golden warmth to these 11 numbers that burns through softly with a deeply meditative glow." Femme Metal Webzine suggested that Williamson "covers the vocals across the range of music here with effortless beauty."

== Track listing ==
1. We Go To Dream
2. Loaded Like A Gun
3. Hide In Your Heart
4. Vermillion
5. Ambienza
6. Scattered
7. Say Goodbye
8. Captured
9. Home
10. My Beautiful Muse
11. Saint Saviour

== Personnel and recording details ==
- Produced and mixed by James Orr
- Astrid Williamson – vocals, piano, keyboards, string arrangements, electric guitar, acoustic guitars, synths, fiddle, autoharp
- James Orr – drum programming, keyboards, synths
- Steve Parker – electric guitar
- Richard Yale – bass
- Christian Parsons – drums
- Cye Woods – violin
