= Requiem & Gallipoli =

Studio album by Astrid Williamson
- Released: 25 December 2015
- Label: One Little Indian

Astrid Williamson chronology
We Go To Dream (2015)	Requiem & Gallipoli (2015)	Into the Mountain (2022)

Requiem & Gallipoli is the seventh album by Astrid Williamson and contains her first full classic composition.

Williamson first performed Requiem & Gallipoli at Requiem for the Fallen, a D-Day Remembrance event at All Saints' Church, Hessle, Yorkshire on 6 June 2015. The event raised funds for a local Hull veterans' charity and Operation Warrior Wellness, a process to address post-traumatic stress disorder in veterans using transcendental mediation in collaboration with the David Lynch Foundation.

Williamson explained the writing process: "I would translate each movement from Latin, then start writing the music at the piano, later orchestrating and singing each individual voice; as I began to transcribe the piano arrangement for the orchestra I found myself thinking, 'this section must to be on flute, not oboe, not bassoon', it was incredibly intuitive work – the music seemed to unfurl before me. I actually dreamt the 'In Paradisum' and had to get up and write it down immediately. I also found it liberating that in essence the piece was not personal to events in my life. It was refreshing to not be pouring out my experiences, rather I felt I was drawing upon a more collective understanding of loss and release."

== Track listing ==
1. Requiem
2. Kyrie
3. Domine Jesu
4. Hostias
5. Sanctus
6. Agnus Dei
7. Libera Me
8. In Paradisium
9. Gallipoli (solo piano version)
10. Gallipoli (orchestral version)
