= Weathermen =

Weathermen may refer to:

- Weather Underground, American political movement commonly called "the Weathermen", 1969–1977
- The Weathermen (band), a semi-satirical Belgian electronic and pop group
- The Weathermen (hip hop group), an American collective
- Combat Weathermen, US Air Force tactical observer/forecasters with ground combat capabilities
- Jonathan King, an English singer-songwriter who used the pseudonym "Weathermen"
- "The Weathermen", a song on Live at Tonic (Marco Benevento album), released in 2007
- "Weathermen", a song on the 2004 album Flowers in the Pavement, by Australian group Bliss n Eso
- New Weathermen Records, an imprint of Ferret Music, an American independent record label

== See also ==
- And the Weathermen Shrug Their Shoulders, 1993 album by Dutch band the Ex
- Weatherman (disambiguation)
