= Flowered Up =

English indie pop-alternative dance band

- Origin: Camden Town, London, England
- Genres: Baggy, alternative dance, indie pop
- Years active: 1989–1994
- Labels: Heavenly; London; Columbia
- Past members: John O'Brien; John Tuvey; Liam Maher; Tim Dorney; Joe Maher; Andy Jackson; Barry Mooncult; Simon 'Sly' Lovechild; Andrew Ireland; Michael Leader Polo

Flowered Up were an English indie pop-alternative dance band, formed in Camden Town, London, in 1989, active during the baggy movement. Their 13-minute single "Weekender" reached the UK top 20. The band split up in 1994 amid drug problems. Following a failed reformation attempt in 2007 and a solo record deal that fell through, frontman Liam Maher died from a heroin overdose in 2009, followed by his brother Joe in 2012, after long-term health problems, .

== Career ==
The band was formed in mid-1989 by singer Liam Maher along with life-long friend, Darren 'Des' Penney. Penny co-write lyrics and managed the band. The original line up included the late John O'Brien on drums, Joe Maher, Liam's younger brother, on guitar, and bass player Andrew Jackson. Simon Gannon guested on keyboard and that line-up played their first two gigs. After a few changes in personnel, the settled line-up included keyboardist Tim Dorney and drummer John Tuvey, with dancer Barry Mooncult adding to their live shows.

After releasing two singles, "It's On" and "Phobia", on Heavenly Records, both of which were minor hits, Flowered Up signed to London Records and recorded their only album, A Life with Brian, in 1991. "Take It" included lyrics by Joe Strummer. The group appeared on the covers of both Melody Maker and NME before releasing the album.

A Life with Brian contained many of their popular live songs, as well as new versions of the previously released singles. Not long afterwards, Flowered Up released the 13-minute-long single "Weekender" on Heavenly, with a video directed by W.I.Z. starring Lee Whitlock and Anna Haigh. Despite the refusal of the group, and Heavenly Records, to compromise on a standard-length edit for radio play, two "radio edits" were circulated. However neither met the needs of radio programmers, because one was merely the full-length version with the two instances of the phrase "fuck off" muted, while the other reduced the length of the intro, but still ran for over 12 minutes. The track became their biggest hit, reaching number 20 on the UK Singles Chart. After the much-publicised drug problems of some members of the band, and unproductive (and some unreleased) studio work, the band split up. Keyboardist Tim Dorney went on to form Republica.

A Life with Brian was re-released by London Records as The Best of Flowered Up, and included the original version of "Weekender". Flowered Up tried to re-form in 2007, but Dorney refused to join, and the planned reunion tour was cancelled.

On 20 October 2009, Liam Maher died of a heroin overdose, aged 41, followed in November 2012 by Joe Maher.

In 2021, Heavenly Records released a limited vinyl run of "Weekender" to coincide with the release of their book Believe in Magic, celebrating the label's 30th anniversary.

The critically acclaimed film accompanying the song, "Weekender", that stars Lee Whitlock and Anna Haigh, was given a fresh sonic and visual update by director W.I.Z. in 2019 with the intention of re-releasing it on DVD for the first time.

COVID and lockdown enabled production of a celebration of the song and film with the documentary I Am Weekender, featuring Lynne Ramsay, Irvine Welsh, Jeremy Deller and many more, talking about its influence and cultural significance. Directed and edited by Chloe Raunet, the documentary, film and many extras were released in June 2023 by the BFI in partnership with Heavenly Films. Screenings followed in Glasgow, London, Glastonbury, Belfast and New York.

Also in 2023, A Life with Brian was remastered.

== Discography ==
=== Albums ===
| Title | Release date | Label | UK Albums Chart |
|---|---|---|---|
| A Life with Brian | 26 Aug 1991 | London Records | 23 n/a |

=== Singles ===
| Title | Release date | Label | UK Singles Chart |
|---|---|---|---|
| "It's On" | 1990 | Heavenly Records | 54 |
| "Phobia" | 1990 | Heavenly Records | 75 |
| "Take It" | 1991 | London Records | 34 |
| "It's On" (re-recorded version) / "Egg Rush" | 1991 | London Records | 38 |
| "Weekender" | 1992 | Heavenly Records/Colombia-Sony Heavenly Records | 20 |
| "Don't Talk Just Kiss" (from the Right Said Fred covers EP The Fred EP) | 1992 | Heavenly Records/Colombia-Sony Heavenly Records | 26 |
| "Better Life" (limited to 500 copies) | 1994 | Heavenly Records/Colombia-Sony Heavenly Records | n/a |

=== Videos ===
"Live" 1990
