= Mainstream (band) =

English rock band

- Origin: England
- Genres: Rock/Alternative Rock
- Years active: 1994–1999
- Label: Nude
- Past members: Anthony Neale; James Hartnell; Conrad Mewton; Greg Cook; Mark James Aviss

Mainstream were an English alternative rock band formed by Conrad Mewton, James Hartnell and Anthony Neale.

Later they were joined by Peter Mullaney (guitar) and later still (after a bit of searching) Mark James Aviss. After performing several successful gigs they attracted label interest. Immediately prior to signing with Nude Records, Peter Mullaney for various reasons departed, later to be replaced with Greg Cook. Signed to Suede's label Nude Records in early 1995 and produced one album (also called Mainstream) in 1998.

The band comprised Anthony Neale (voice) (now frontman for The Truths on Aardvark Records), James Hartnell (guitars), Conrad Mewton (bass), Greg Cook (keyboards) and Mark James Aviss (drums) (now with The Little Things).

Despite having been renowned for their live performances, the album failed to chart anywhere and the group split up shortly afterwards.

== Discography ==
=== Albums ===
- Mainstream (Nude), 1998

=== Singles ===
- "Make It Easy" (Nude), promo 7"
- "Hurricane" (Nude), 1997
- "Privilege" (Nude), 1997 (UK No. 85)
- "Step Right Up" (Nude), 1998 (UK No. 80)
- "CanJam" (Nude), 1998 (UK No. 88)
