= Here Come the Vikings =

Here Come The Vikings

Studio album by Astrid Williamson
- Released: 8 June 2009
- Label: Incarnation Records \ One Little Indian

Astrid Williamson chronology
Day Of The Lone Wolf (2006)	Here Come The Vikings (2009)	Pulse (2011)

Professional ratings
Review scores
Source	Rating
Allmusic	4/5 stars
The List	4/5 stars

Here Come The Vikings is the fourth solo album by Scottish singer-songwriter Astrid Williamson which, as with her previous release, Day Of The Lone Wolf, she produced.

Allmusic suggested 'she wraps naked sentiments of love, lust and lament in her breathy voice'

== Track listing ==
1. Store
2. Sing The Body Electric
3. Shut Your Mouth
4. How You Take My Breath Away
5. Crashing Minis
6. Falling Down
7. Pinned
8. Slake
9. Eve
10. The Stars Are Beautiful

== Personnel ==
- Astrid Williamson - vocals, electric guitar, keyboards, programming
- Richard Yale - bass guitar
- Chris Parsons - drums and percussion
- Steven Parker - guitar and tambourine
- Nick Powell - keyboards
- Guy Barker - trumpet
- Mark Treffel - organ and Wurlitzer
- Ben Evans - percussion
- Ruth Gottlieb - violin, viola
- Sarah Wilson - cello
- David Pickering Pick - tubular bells
- Sian Buss - euphonium
- Martin Buss - cornet

Mixing by Astrid Williamson and David Pickering Pick

Mastered and recorded by David Pickering Pick

Cover photography by Nicole Gallard
