= Weatherman =

Weatherman or Weather man may refer to:

== Professions or roles ==
- Weatherman, a member of Weather Underground, an American left-wing organization active 1969–1977
- Weather forecaster, a scientist who forecasts the weather
- Weather presenter, a presenter of weather forecasts on television or radio

== People ==
- Kyle Weatherman (born 1997), American race car driver
- Woody Weatherman (born 1965), American guitarist in Corrosion of Conformity
- David Wills (musician), also known as "The Weatherman", member of the band Negativland

== Arts, entertainment, and media ==
=== Fictional characters ===
- Weatherman, the fictional leader of Stormwatch in comics
- J. Walter Weatherman, a character on the American television comedy Arrested Development

=== Music ===
==== Albums ====
- The Weatherman (album), a 2013 album by American singer-songwriter Gregory Alan Isakov
- The Weatherman LP, a 2007 album by American hip-hop artist Evidence

==== Performers and Groups ====
- The Weathermen (hip-hop group)

==== Songs ====
- "Weatherman", a song by singer-songwriter Delbert McClinton from his eponymous 1993 album that appeared in the movie Groundhog Day
- "Weatherman" (song), a 1998 single by Irish band Juniper
- "Weatherman", a song from the 2010 album Walking with the Night, by American singer Adriana Evans
- "Weatherman", a 2012 song by American band Dead Sara
- "Weatherman", a song by Hank Williams Jr. from the 1981 album The Pressure Is On

=== Other arts, entertainment, and media ===
- "Weatherman" (short story), a 1990 science-fiction short story by American Lois McMaster Bujold
- The Weather Man, a 2005 American film

== See also ==
- Digital Weatherman, a system for automated audio weather forecasts first marketed in 1986
- Weather Girl (disambiguation)
- Weathermen (disambiguation)
