= Goya Dress =

Scottish alternative rock band

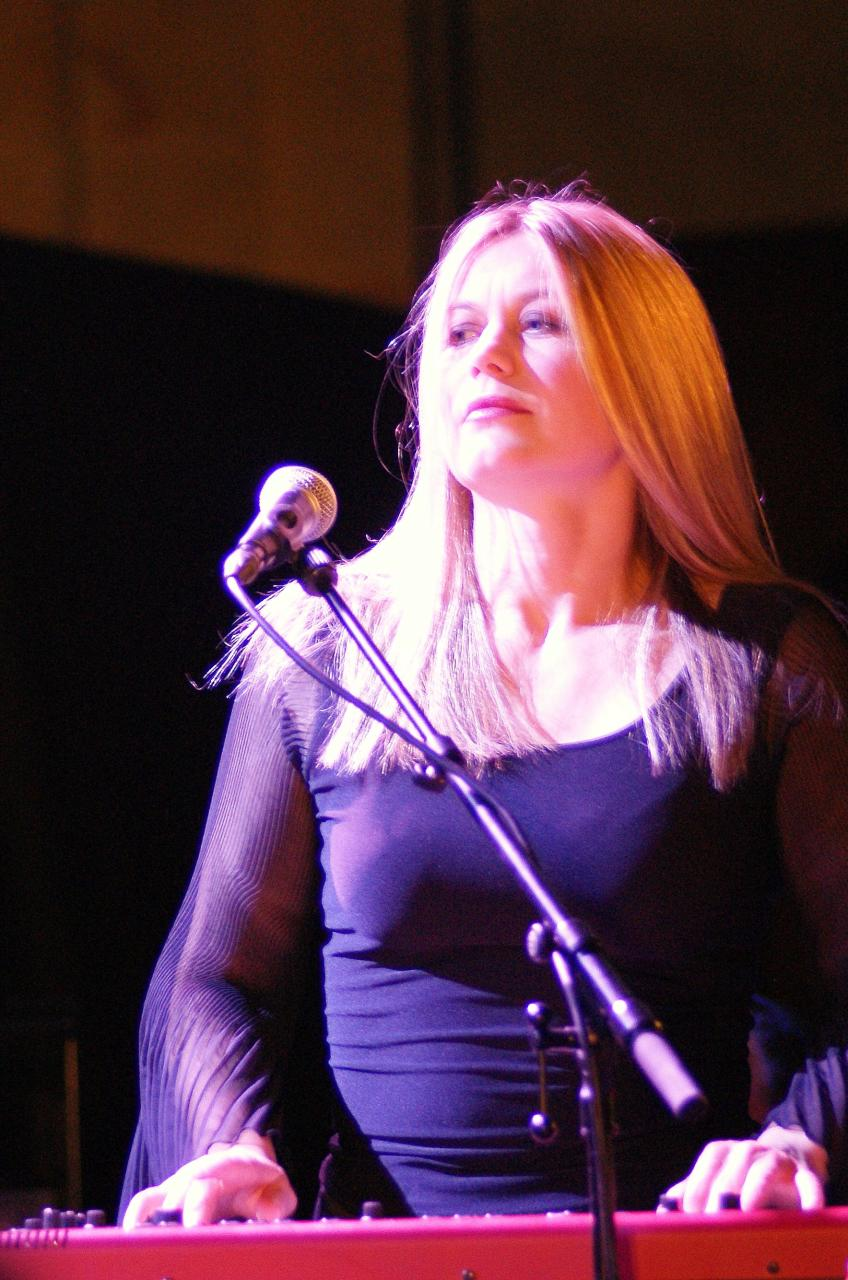
- Astrid Williamson at Dom Church, Utrecht.

Background information
- Genres: Alternative rock
- Years active: 1990s
- Labels: Nude
- Past members: Astrid Williamson; Terry de Castro; Simon Pearson

Goya Dress was a Scottish alternative rock band, founded by singer/keyboardist/guitarist Astrid Williamson, bass player Terry de Castro and drummer Simon Pearson. Their first EP Bedroom Cinema was released in 1995. Next release was also EP called Ruby and in 1996, the band released their first full-length album Rooms. It was produced by Welsh musician and former The Velvet Underground member John Cale. The group disbanded shortly after the album was released. After the band broke up, Williamson had a successful solo career. De Castro and Pearson subsequently played with Cinerama and The Wedding Present. De Castro also had a spell with Animals That Swim and released a solo album, A Casa Verde, in 2009. Simon Pearson died of cancer 3 September 2023 aged 54.

== Discography ==
- Bedroom Cinema (EP, 1995)
- Ruby EP (EP, 1995)
- Crush (single, 1996)
- Glorious (EP, 1996)
- Rooms (1996)
