= The Drowners =

1992 single by Suede

Single by Suede

from the album Suede
- B-side: "To the Birds"; "My Insatiable One"
- Released: 11 May 1992
- Studio: Master Rock (London, England)
- Genre: Britpop; glam rock
- Length: 4:10
- Label: Nude
- Songwriters: Brett Anderson; Bernard Butler
- Producer: Ed Buller

Suede singles chronology
| "The Drowners" (1992) | "Metal Mickey" (1992) |

Music video
- "The Drowners" (UK video) by Suede on YouTube

"The Drowners" is the debut single of English rock band Suede, released on 11 May 1992 on Nude Records. It was later included on the band's debut album, Suede (1993). "The Drowners" charted at number 49 on the UK Singles Chart.

== Background ==
Though not a hit at first, it amassed airplay over time and has become one of the band's definitive singles. Two different videos were produced for the song, one on rotation in the UK and the other created for the American market. The cover art features a seventies photo of German model Veruschka body-painted with a man's suit.

== Legacy ==
In a retrospective review of the song, Troy Carpenter of AllMusic wrote: "'The Drowners' itself is a raucous anthem, lassoed by Bernard Butler's punctuated guitar riff. Singer Brett Anderson's ambiguous lyrics ("We kiss in his room/to a popular tune") and high-pitched croon recall Bowie's most theatrical moments, but in a different musical setting." It garnered much acclaim from NME and Melody Maker, who both voted the song single of the year.

In 2014, NME ranked the song at number 104 in its list of the 500 Greatest Songs of All Time. "The Drowners" was placed at number 40 in a 2016 poll of "The 100 Greatest Alternative Singles of the '90s" by music site PopMatters.

== Cover versions ==
The song was covered by Bristol space rock band Flying Saucer Attack. B-side "My Insatiable One", was covered by Morrissey during his 1992 world tour. The song was covered in concert by the Manic Street Preachers. Bernard Butler played two songs at the same gig but contrary to many reports did not join them for The Drowners – a recording was released as a B-side to their single "She Is Suffering" in late 1994.

== Track listings ==
All songs were written by Brett Anderson and Bernard Butler.

UK 7-inch single

A. "The Drowners" (radio edit)
AA. "To the Birds"

UK 12-inch and CD single

1. "The Drowners"
2. "To the Birds"
3. "My Insatiable One"

European maxi-CD single

1. "The Drowners"
2. "Where the Pigs Don't Fly"
3. "He's Dead"
4. "My Insatiable One" (piano version)

US CD single

1. "The Drowners" – 4:10
2. "My Insatiable One" – 2:57
3. "To the Birds" – 5:23
4. "The Big Time" – 4:27
5. "He's Dead" (live at Glastonbury, June 1993) – 5:31

Japanese CD compilation

1. "The Drowners"
2. "To the Birds"
3. "My Insatiable One"
4. "Metal Mickey"
5. "Where the Pigs Don't Fly"
6. "He's Dead"

== Charts ==
| Chart (1992) | Peak position |
|---|---|
| Australia (ARIA) | 39 |
| UK Singles (OCC) | 49 |

== Release history ==
| Region | Date | Format(s) | Label(s) | Ref. |
|---|---|---|---|---|
| United Kingdom | 11 May 1992 | 7-inch vinyl; 12-inch vinyl; CD | Nude | |
| Australia | 22 June 1992 | 12-inch vinyl; cassette | Nude | |
| Japan | 21 November 1992 | CD | Nude | |
