= Metal Mickey (song) =

1992 single by Suede

Single by Suede

from the album Suede
- B-side: "Where the Pigs Don't Fly"; "He's Dead"
- Released: 14 September 1992
- Studio: Master Rock (London, England)
- Genre: Britpop; glam rock
- Length: 3:27
- Label: Nude
- Songwriters: Brett Anderson; Bernard Butler
- Producer: Ed Buller

Suede singles chronology
| "The Drowners" (1992) | "Metal Mickey" (1992) | "Animal Nitrate" (1993) |

"Metal Mickey" is the second single released by English rock band Suede, issued on 14 September 1992 on Nude Records. It was included on the band's debut album, Suede, the following year. The song charted at No. 17 on the UK Singles Chart, an improvement on the previous single "The Drowners", which fell short of the top 40.

== Background ==
The song is an up-tempo rock song. Guitarist Bernard Butler has said that its musical inspiration was "The Shoop Shoop Song", famously remade by Cher for the 1990 film Mermaids. The guitar solo, according to Butler was inspired by the Kinks' "You Really Got Me". Other than its nod to the robot from the 80s children's sitcom of the same name, singer Brett Anderson has said the song was inspired by Daisy Chainsaw vocalist KatieJane Garside. Charting in the top-twenty in the UK, the single earned the band their first appearance on Top of the Pops.

== Reception ==
Ian McCann of NME awarded the track the Obligatory Single of the Week, and said that Anderson "churns out a second easy classic". With its "churning guitars," McCann said: "You feel like you've heard [the chorus] a hundred times when it's only been twice." Likewise Sharon O'Connell of Melody Maker also awarded the track as Single of the Week; praising it "for its wit and swagger, cheek and suaveness." She said "'Metal Mickey' lunges wantonly in with a sub-Hendrix crash and the roar of a tinsel-bedecked Concorde on take-off [...] Suede are still deliciously drunk on creative confidence, and this is another hat-trick of alarmingly casual allure."

Europe's radio newsweekly Music & Media wrote: "Good song, good band; sometimes life is too simple. Sounding as if recorded in their own rehearsal room, the spirit of real rock roll is there with plenty of flower power." The song was well received in the US. Billboard wrote: "It's toe-tapping, head-bobbing, club-rocking stuff, reminiscent of British music from the Kinks to Bowie." Linda Ryan of the Gavin Report said: "it's a tough, angst-ridden sound that smacks of frustration, the sexual kind [...] the guitars are loud and tough and guaranteed not to sound like any other guitar-oriented (read: grunge) band on your playlist." Performed by the group on The Tonight Show with Jay Leno, it became the only Suede single to crack the US Modern Rock Tracks top 10, peaking at No. 7 on 26 June 1993, nine weeks after first appearing on the chart.

== Track listings ==
All songs were written by Brett Anderson and Bernard Butler.

UK 7-inch and cassette single

1. "Metal Mickey"
2. "Where the Pigs Don't Fly"

UK 12-inch and CD single

1. "Metal Mickey"
2. "Where the Pigs Don't Fly"
3. "He's Dead"

European and Australian CD single; Australian cassette single

1. "Metal Mickey"
2. "The Drowners"
3. "My Insatiable One"
4. "To the Birds"

== Charts ==
| Chart (1992–1993) | Peak position |
|---|---|
| Australia (ARIA) | 39 |
| Europe (Eurochart Hot 100) | 68 |
| Sweden (Sverigetopplistan) | 33 |
| UK Singles (Official Charts) | 17 |
| US Modern Rock Tracks (Billboard) | 7 |

== Release history ==
| Region | Date | Format(s) | Label(s) | Ref. |
|---|---|---|---|---|
| United Kingdom | 14 September 1992 | 7-inch vinyl; 12-inch vinyl; CD; cassette | Nude | |
| Europe | December 1992 | CD | Nude | |
| Australia | 5 April 1993 | CD; cassette | Nude | |
