= Andrew Montgomery =

Scottish singer

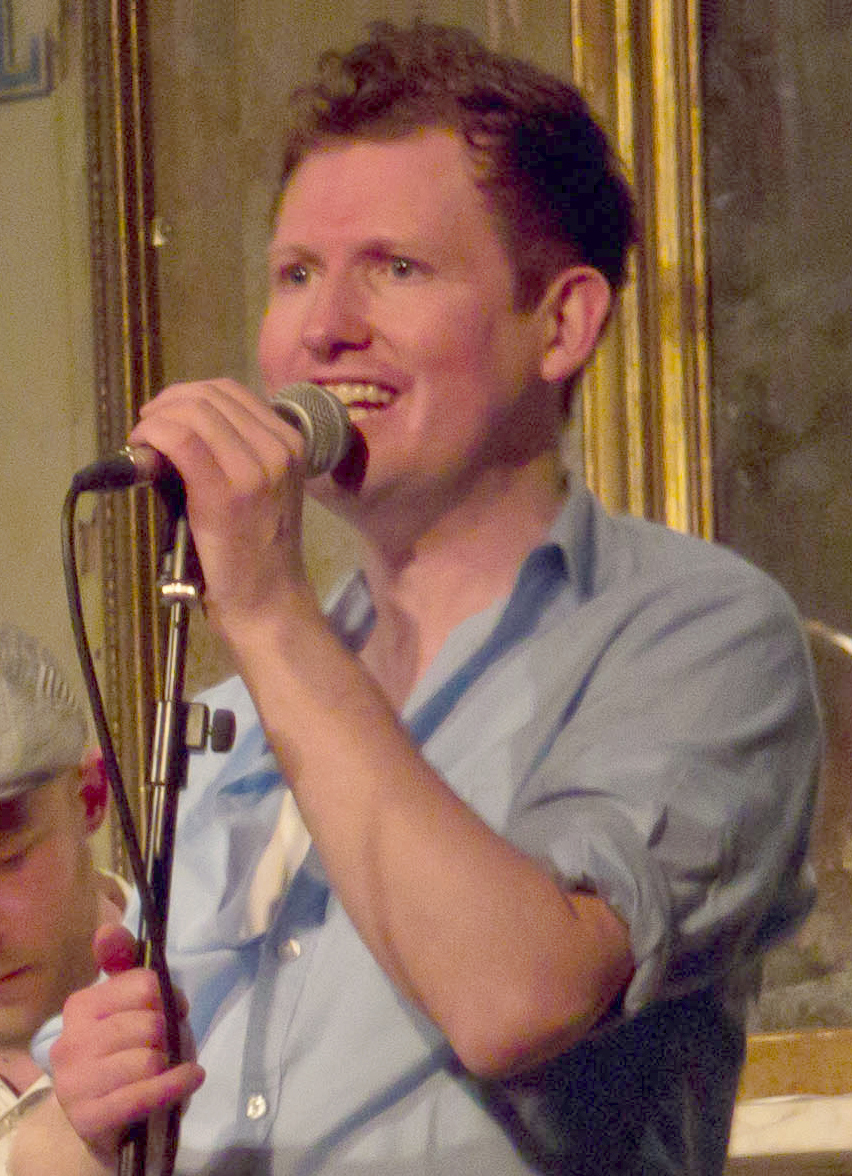
- Montgomery in 2011

Background information
- Born: Andrew James Montgomery
- Origin: East Kilbride, Scotland
- Genres: Alternative rock, electronic
- Occupation: Musician
- Instrument: Vocals
- Label: Nude
- Website: Official website

Andrew Montgomery is a Scottish singer who is best known as a member of the Aberdeen indie rock band Geneva, who rose to fame in the 90s.

== Musical career ==
Montgomery met guitarist Steven Dora in Aberdeen, in 1992, and they began writing music together. They later got together with guitarist Stuart Evans, bassist Keith Graham and drummer Craig Brown, and formed a band called Sunfish.

In 1996 The band was signed to the record label Nude, who were well known at the time as the record label for the bands Suede, The Jennifers (later Supergrass) and Black Box Recorder. It was at this time that the band changed its name, first to Garland, then to Geneva.

Geneva had moderate chart success and a loyal fan base, with four Top 40 singles and a critically acclaimed debut album, Further, which was released in 1997. Following over a year of wrangling with their record label, their follow-up album, Weather Underground, was released in 2000. As a consequence of the complete lack of publicity surrounding its release, the album and its two singles bombed, and the band split up later that year.

At the height of their career, Geneva received wide critical acclaim, particularly with regard to Montgomery's singing voice. Often referred to as "angelic"^{1}, "heavenly"^{1} or "celestial", there was a distinct 'choirboy' quality to Montgomery's voice.

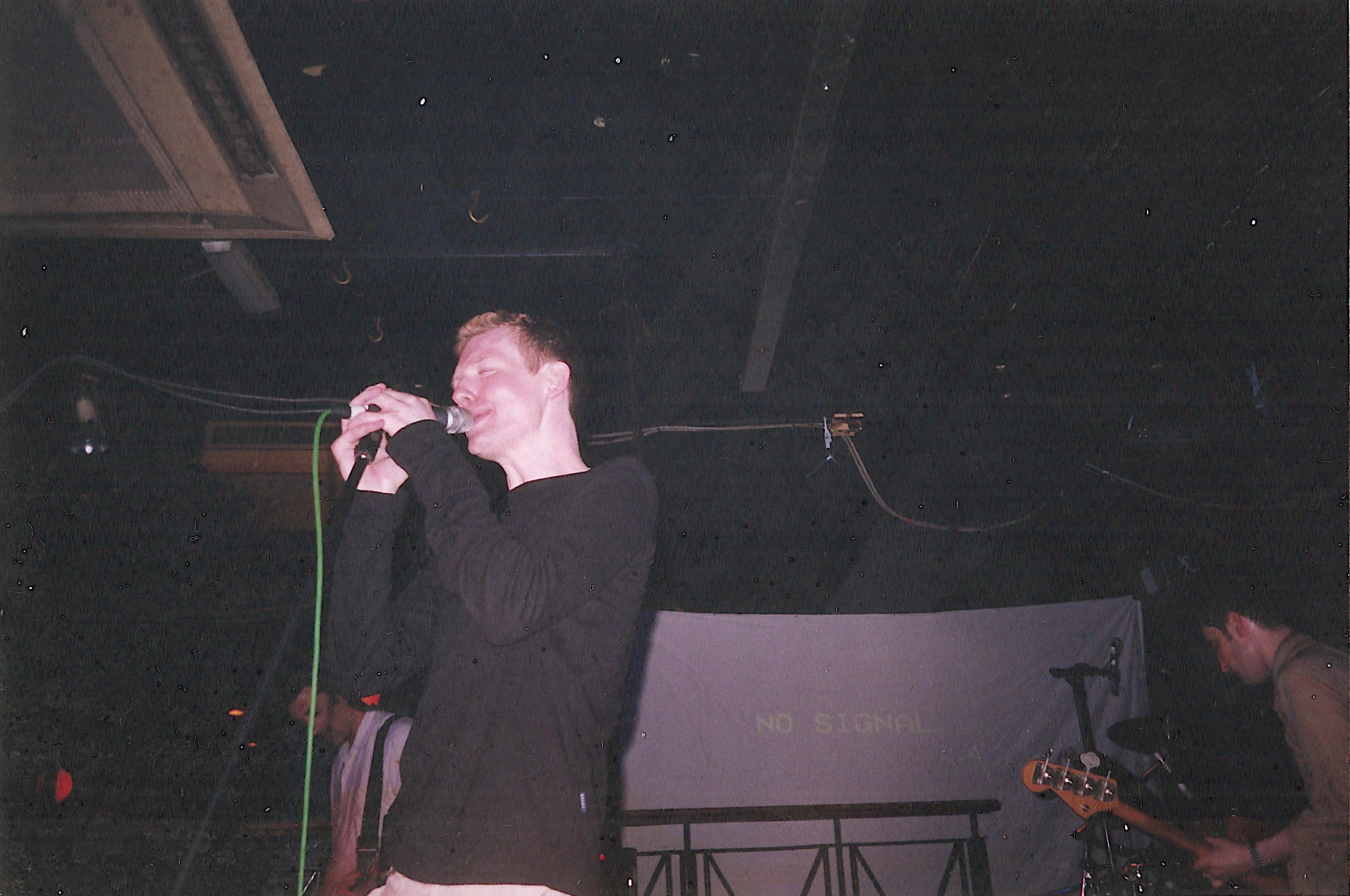
Montgomery performing with Geneva in 2000

== After Geneva ==
Following the band's split, Montgomery moved to New York City, where he met and began collaborating with a number of musicians, including Steve Slingeneyer of Soulwax, and Ben Ellis of Serafin and Catherine Wheel. His most notable collaboration at this time was with experimental composer Ben Neill, and he featured heavily on Neill's 2002 album Automotive. Montgomery later accompanied Neill on his tour of the US. He also engaged in a collaboration with Overseer, culminating in a contribution to his 2003 album Wreckage.

Montgomery moved permanently back to UK in 2003, and formed a London-based band called Amityville with guitarist Stuart Peck, Ben Ellis and drummer David Bevis. The band's only release was a limited edition EP, Pacific Radio Fire, in 2004.

== Solo return ==
Montgomery announced in July 2014 that his début solo album, "Ruled By Dreams" would receive a worldwide release on 5 October 2014, supported with a UK tour. The album was slated to feature Suede guitarist Richard Oakes, Norwegian singer Kate Havnevik and would be produced and co-written with Alison Moyet collaborator Sean McGhee.

== Accolades ==
"The fountain burst of puretone sound that flies from his gob is one of the most emotionally resonant phenomena in current pop and in conjunction with his taste for dark-night-of-the-soul lyrics and the swooping, string-laden melodies of (mostly) Steven Dora, it makes Geneva the strongest mystique magnets this side of a weeping statue of Mary Magdalene."
"It's the voice that you fall for, of course. There are easy reference points – Jeff Buckley, David McAlmont, Radiohead – but what thrills most is Montgomery's restraint. He could show off, demonstrate his "virtuosity", ultimately be used by his ability; remarkably, he resists."
"Geneva have carved their own identity with Montgomery's astonishing vocal range. The man is in command of several more octaves than most and his beautifully pure vocals are counterpointed by the chiming notes of the instrumentation"
"Geneva's singer Andrew Montgomery is simply one of the best you will ever hear. Higher and higher he goes, more and more exalted he seems by the songs ... an amazing natural gift ... the vocal melodies are uncanny, different, almost devotional."
