= Rob Overseer =

English DJ/producer

Overseer
- Also known as: Rob Overseer, Fatlantic
- Born: Robert George Howes
- Genres: Electronic, big beat house, breakbeat
- Years active: 1995–present
- Label: When! Records
- Formerly of: Kanute
- Website: roboverseer.rocks

Robert George Howes, known professionally as Overseer (or Rob Overseer) is an English electronic music producer and DJ, also working under the alias Fatlantic and part of Kanute with Rachael Mantle. His works have been included in soundtracks for Blade: Trinity, The Animatrix, Snatch, Any Given Sunday and The Girl Next Door, as well as video games like Gran Turismo 3, Edgar Torronteras` Extreme Biker, Need for Speed: Underground, SSX 3, NFL Gameday 2004, Killer Chambers, several Matchstick Productions ski films, Stuntman, Twin Caliber (Rage Software, 2002) which was used to promote his then new EP "Force Multiply" in game's manual, and Ridge Racer Unbounded. His songs are also frequently used in TV commercials such as "Hairdo" for Vodafone which featured his song Velocity Shift or the Endeavor commercial for Mitsubishi, which featured "Horndog". “Velocity shift” was also used in a Dodge commercial featuring SRT’s line up for 2003 with the Dodge SRT-4, Dodge Viper, And the Dodge Ram SRT-10. Also, the MTV show Maui Fever features his single Horndog in the opening credits.

Overseer also records with singer/songwriter Rachael Gray. They first worked together on the track "Sparks" which appeared on the Overseer album "Wreckage" on the Columbia label. Following the success of "Sparks", work began on a full album project under the name Kanute. Also, former UFC fighter Ken Shamrock used Rob's "Slayed" as his entrance theme on his last two fights. In addition, Mauricio "Shogun" Rua used this song as his entrance song for UFC 76 as well as Keith Jardine for UFC 89. On 27 September 2018, Howes announced a new album and change of name stating "Overseer is no more, I am now trading as FATLANTIC" on his personal Facebook page.

Overseer's style is most frequently described as big beat.

== Wreckage ==
Wreckage was released in the US in 2003. The UK release of this album was plagued with many difficulties that led to a six-month delay in its release, prompting Rob to move to new management at the end of 2005.

== 2006 album ==
In 2006 Overseer was to make a second album. The album was expected to contain Skylight, a track that featured on the Blade: Trinity soundtrack. It was later announced that the album had been "held up for a little while".

Two albums arose from this. One, 2005's Macrowaves, originally was only available via a rare CD-R released by Warner Chappell Music. The album later got an official release from Howes on his Bandcamp page in 2020 and has since been added to streaming platforms.

In a reply on his official Twitter, Overseer posted, in regards to a second Kanute album, and the future of Overseer : "Sorry I'm taking my sweet f'ing time, concentrating on Kanute album for next few months, then back to Overseer cheers x"

This could maybe mean that the songs "Skylight", "Invincible Love" and "Hammerhead" may move to a newer album, much like Wreckage, which compiled Overseer tracks from the last 3–5 years they were created.

On 27 September 2018, Howes announced a new album and change of name stating "Overseer is no more, I am now trading as FATLANTIC" on his personal Facebook page

== Recent work (2019-present) ==
Overseer did in fact return in 2019, releasing the five-track EP Superconductor.

A new single, Firing Squad, was released in 2024, featuring American rapper and Wu-Tang Clan member Method Man.

== As Overseer ==
=== Albums ===
- Wreckage (2003 - Columbia)
- Macrowaves (2020 - Self-released)

=== EPs ===
- The Zeptastic (1995 - Soundclash)
- Hit The Tarmac (1997 - Soundclash)
- Everything Louder Than Everything Else (2001 - Columbia)
- Superconductor (2019 - Warner Chappell)

=== Singles ===
- Firing Squad (Feat. Method Man) - (2024)

=== Remixes ===
- Adam F. feat. MOP - "Stand Clear" (Overseer Retake) - (2002)
- Kaiser Chiefs - "I Predict a Riot" (Overseer Remix) - (2005)
- Overseer - "Slayed" (Kostas Petropoulos Mix) - (2005)

=== Compilation appearances ===
- Mad Dash Racing (2001) - Stompbox, Insectocutor Dub
- The Tuxedo (2002) - Screw Up
- The Animatrix OST (2003) - Supermoves (Animatrix remix)
- Blade: Trinity OST (2004) - Skylight
- Need For Speed Underground - Supermoves, Doomsday
- TOCA Touring Car series - Supermoves
- SSX3 - Screw Up
- Gran Turismo 3 - Stompbox, Supermoves, Screw Up
- Formula One 2001 (Quick race, NTSC-U version only) - Screw Up, Supermoves, Basstrap (listed as Duck-it in sound options)
- Shaun White Snowboarding - Stompbox
- Edgar Torronteras Extreme Biker - Stompbox, Velocity Shift
- Snatch (2000) - Supermoves
- Any Given Sunday OST - Stompbox
- MotorStorm: Arctic Edge - Hammerhead
- Stuntman - Basstrap, Velocity Shift
- Driver: San Francisco - Pump Action
- Twin Caliber (2002) - Supermoves (used as main menu theme).
- Ridge Racer Unbounded (2012) - Crash & Burn

== With Kanute ==
- "Standing Room Only" (2010)
- "Ursa Minor" (2014)
- "Flotsam" (2018)

== As Fatlantic ==
- "Offshore Breaks" (2018)
- "Gettin Like That" (with Jordan Jane) (2019)
