= Astrid Williamson =

Scottish musician, composer, and songwriter

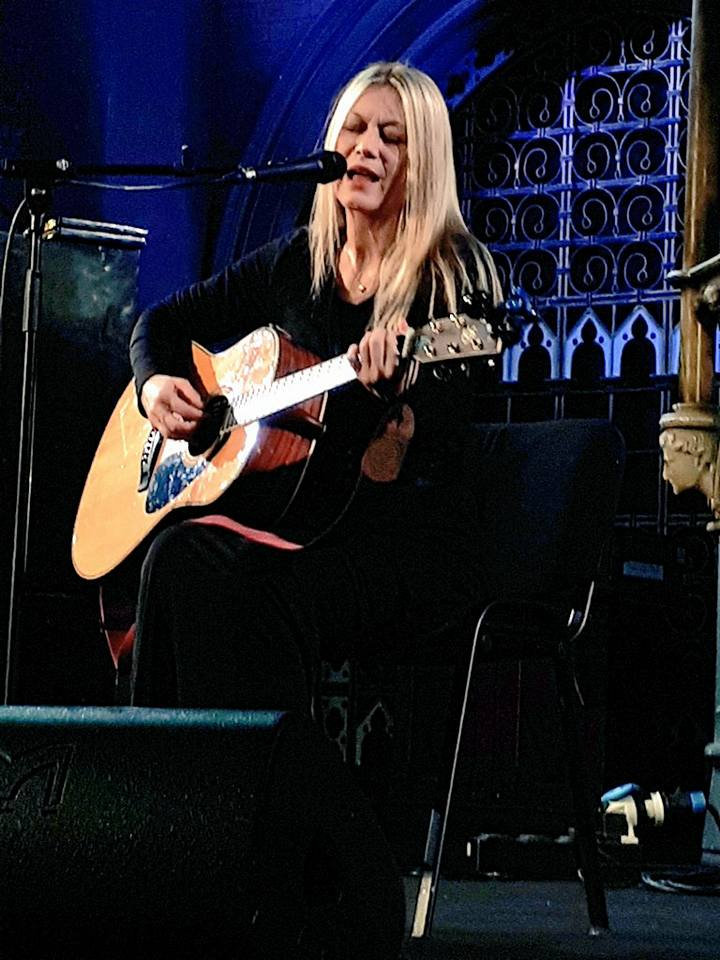

Background information
- Born: 28 November 1968 (age 57); Shetland, Scotland
- Genres: Pop, rock
- Occupation: Musician
- Years active: 1994–present
- Labels: Incarnation, One Little Independent Records
- Formerly of: Goya Dress
- Website: astridwilliamson.com

Astrid Williamson (born 28 November 1968) is a Scottish musician, composer and songwriter.

== Life and music career ==
Growing up in Shetland, she enjoyed playing the piano from an early age and The Shetland Folk Festival provided early experience both of local music tradition and stagecraft. She went on to graduate from the Royal Scottish Academy of Music and Drama (RSAMD) as a classically trained pianist, where she also studied under composer Judith Weir.

Astrid formed the band Goya Dress in the 1990s with Terry de Castro & Simon Pearson, releasing EPs & only one album, Rooms (produced by The Velvet Underground's John Cale) in 1996 before disbanding in 1998. Since then she has released seven albums to date via her own label, Incarnation Records, Universal \ BMG and One Little Indian.

During her career she has collaborated with other artists including the legendary DJ / producer, Arthur Baker, Oskar, The Bilderberg Group, Milk & Honey Band, Canadian singer songwriter, Tara Maclean as well as adding vocals to releases from The Hope Blister and British indie supergroup, Electronic. She has toured with Brendan Perry, providing keyboards and backing vocals on his 2010 Ark tour. Guitarist & Brian Eno collaborator Leo Abrahams produced her fifth album Pulse in 2011.

Astrid recorded backing vocals for the track 'I Stopped My Car To Fill Up' on 'Performance & Cocktails' by Welsh indie band, The Stereophonics

Astrid reunited with Goya Dress producer, John Cale, for a live performance of his mixed media piece, 'Dead Agents' at the ICA, London in 1999

The song 'If I Loved You from her debut solo album Boy For You was covered by Abra Moore, retitled 'Someone Else's Mess' and featured in the film 'Serving Sara'

Her first large-scale classical composition, Requiem & Gallipoli, was first performed at Hessle All Saints' Church as part of a 2015 D-Day remembrance event, which raised funds for a local Hull veterans' charity and aimed to make people aware of Operation Warrior Wellness, a programme addressing veterans' post-traumatic stress disorder using transcendental meditation.

Following her involvement as part of Dead Can Dance's 2012-3 touring band she collaborated with the band's Lisa Gerrard, co-writing 'Seven Seas' & 'Neptune' with her and 'Estelita' with Gerrard & Daniel Johns of Silverchair The resulting 2014 album 'Twilight Kingdom' also featured a cover of 'Too Far Gone' penned by Russell Crowe & Alan Doyle which was arranged and performed by Williamson & Gerrard.

Her musical style is subtle, evocative and original and has been compared to Carole King and Joni Mitchell.

== Discography ==
=== Solo albums ===
- Boy For You (1998)
- Carnation \ Astrid Williamson (2002 \ 2003)
- Day Of The Lone Wolf (2006)
- Here Come The Vikings (2009)
- Pulse (2011)
- We Go To Dream (2015)
- Requiem and Gallipoli (2015)
- Into the Mountain (2022)
- Shetland Suite (2024)

=== Singles ===
- I Am The Boy For You (1998)
- Hozanna (1998)
- Reach / Run picture disk (2004)
- Superman 2 (2006)
- Shhh... (2006)

=== With Goya Dress ===
- Bedroom Cinema EP (1995 – Nude Records)
- Ruby EP (1995 – Nude Records)
- "Glorious" single (1995 – Nude Records)
- "Crush" single (1995 – Nude Records)
- Rooms album (1996 – Nude Records)
- 1994–1996 (2014 Incarnation Records \ One Little Indian (I-tunes release)

=== With Stephan Eicher ===
- 'Louanges' album (1999)
- 'Sans Vouloir Te Commander' single (1999)

=== With Electronic ===
- Twisted Tenderness (2000)

=== With Arthur Baker ===
- 1000 Years (Tommy Boy Silver Label – 2003)

=== With Lisa Gerrard ===
- Twilight Kingdom (2014)
