= Nude Records =

British independent record label

Nude
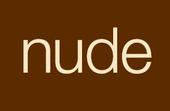
- Founded: 1991
- Founder: Saul Galpern
- Status: Active
- Distributors: RED/Essential, The Orchard Sony, PIAS
- Genre: Indie rock
- Location: London, England

Nude Records is an independent record label, established in August 1991 in London. The label was set up and operated by Saul Galpern, who had previously worked with artists such as Simply Red, The Fall, Julian Cope, The Triffids, The Slits and Au Pairs.

The label filed for voluntary liquidation in December 2001, before it was re-established by Galpern in 2016.

== History ==
The label's first success was with Suede, whose debut album, Suede (1993), debuted at the top of the UK Albums Chart, and was the fastest-selling debut album since Frankie Goes To Hollywood's Welcome to the Pleasuredome almost ten years earlier. The band went on to win the Mercury Prize that year, and received five Brit Awards nominations. They had three No. 1 hit albums in the UK Albums Chart. Other artists with chart success signed to the label included the Scottish band Geneva, who had Top 20 success with their debut album Further; Black Box Recorder who also achieved a Top 20 hit single and album with The Facts of Life (2000); plus chart album hits for Ultrasound, Lowgold, and Billy Mackenzie.

The label had a UK distribution deal with 3MV/Vital (later Pinnacle Distribution) and an international licensing arrangement with Sony, which ended in 2000, before moving to PIAS. Subsequently, the label hit financial difficulties in 2000. In December 2001, after the label lost its distribution deal with Sony, a new deal with Zomba fell through at the last minute. The collapse of the label led to delays with Black Box Recorder's third album, Passionoia, which was not released until 2003. It was believed Suede would be unaffected by the closure of the label as Nude's international partner label Sony would release their next album, A New Morning. The label returned briefly in 2005 via a deal with V2 which saw the release of the compilation album Future's Burning. It featured songs from up-and-coming British bands such as Franz Ferdinand, Bloc Party, Kaiser Chiefs, The Libertines, Razorlight and others (although none of the artists had ever been signed to Nude). However, The Independent commented that it was "easily surpassed by an hour on iTunes" and the label was officially dissolved in July 2007.

In 2016, Saul Galpern re-established the label with a new marketing and distribution deal. The label went on to release albums by Malcolm Middleton and Lou Rhodes. Former Arab Strap member Middleton released Summer of '13, in May 2016. It was funded by a campaign on Pledge Music, and produced by Miaoux Miaoux and Lone Pigeon. Whilst in anticipation of her fourth album release, Rhodes released the singles "All the Birds" in April, and "All I Need" in June 2016. A month later, the album theyesandeye was released through Nude Records. It included a cover of the song "Angels" originally performed by The xx.

== Artists ==
The following list features the notable artists and bands who released music through Nude Records. The artists appear in chronological order of their first release (single or album) for the label. This list is probably incomplete. Bands from the Future's Burning compilation are not included.

- Suede
- The Jennifers
- Sharkboy
- Goya Dress
- Geneva
- Mainstream
- Billy Mackenzie
- Astrid Williamson
- Lou Rhodes
- Malcolm Middleton
- Juanita Stein
- Lowgold
- Duels
- Get Well Soon

== See also ==
- List of record labels
- List of independent UK record labels
