= White Lies discography =

Band discography

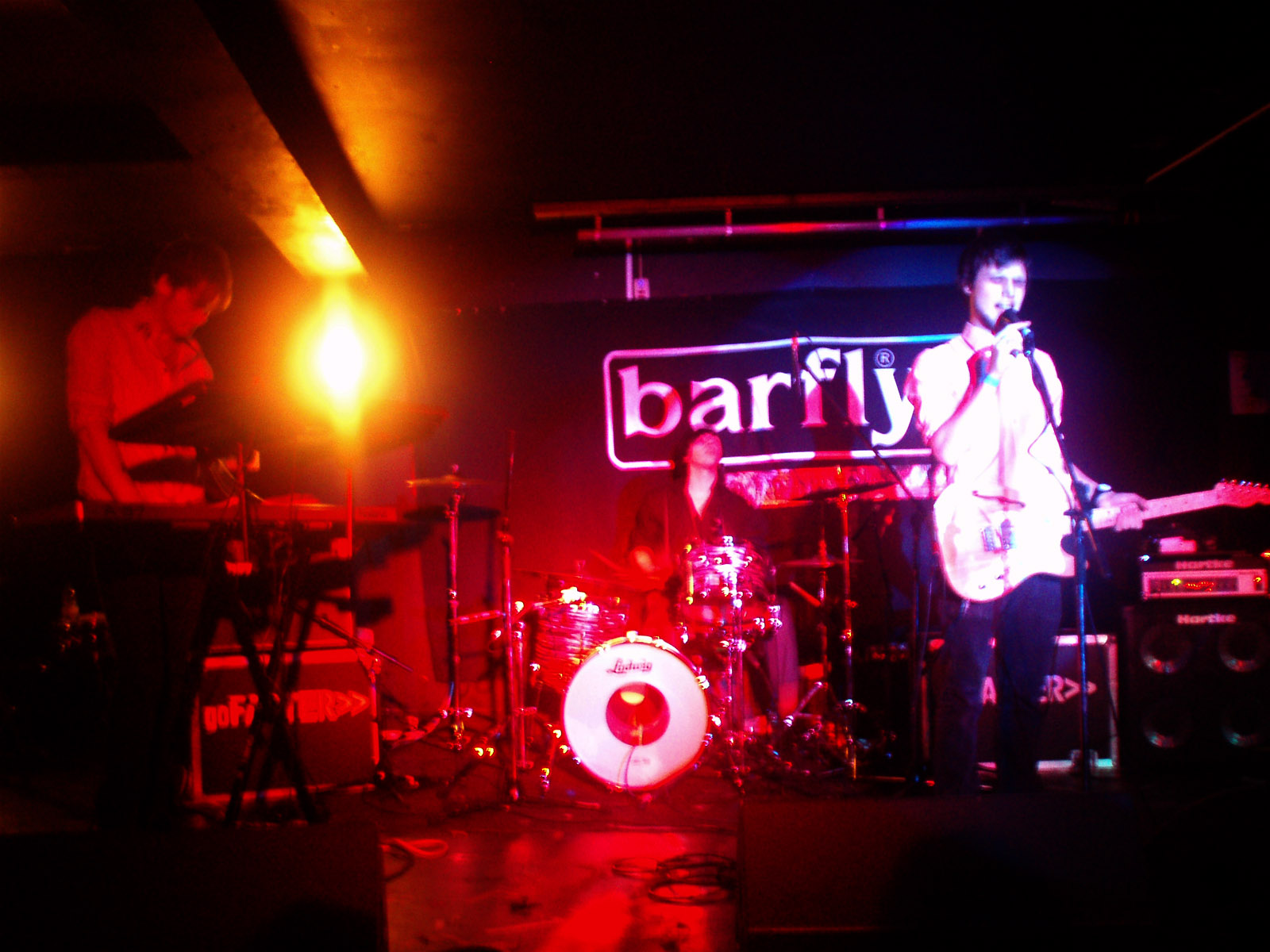
- White Lies performing in Brighton in early 2008
- Studio albums: 7
- Extended plays: 2
- Singles: 12
- Music videos: 10

The discography of White Lies, a London-based indie rock band, consists of seven studio albums, two extended plays and twelve singles. Formerly known as Fear of Flying, the group formed in Ealing in west London in 2002, whilst founding members Charles Cave and Jack Lawrence-Brown were both still at school. Harry McVeigh joined the band in 2004. They began as a "weekend project", before later releasing two 7-inch vinyls, "Routemaster/Round Three" and "Three's a Crowd/Forget-Me-Nots".

White Lies' first release was a short extended play, titled "Unfinished Business". The release contained only two tracks and was limited to only 500 copies. They made their television debut on Later... with Jools Holland in May 2008, where they played "Unfinished Business" and "Death", the latter of which was released as a single later that year and reached number 52 in the United Kingdom. The band's second single, "To Lose My Life" was released in January 2009, and was their first single to break the top forty of the UK Singles Chart, reaching number 34. To Lose My Life..., the band's debut album, was released one week later. The album was a commercial success, debuting at number one on the UK Albums Chart. It was the first debut album by a British band to do so in 2009. The album also charted in Ireland and the Netherlands, reaching peaks of 22 and 31 respectively. A third single from the album, "Farewell to the Fairground", was released on 23 March 2009. The release marked the band's most successful single to date, reaching number 33 in the UK and spending 5 weeks on the chart. "Death" was re-released on 29 June 2009. A music video was created for "Death" (Crystal Castles Remix).

== Albums ==
=== Studio albums ===
Title	Album details	Peak chart positions										Certifications
Title	Album details	UK	AUT	BEL	DEN	FRA	GER	NLD	SCO	SWI	US	Certifications
To Lose My Life...	Released: 19 January 2009; Label: Fiction (#1793239); Formats: CD, LP, digital download	1	57	24	10	119	50	31	3	73	146	BPI: Gold; IFPI DEN: Gold; IRMA: Gold
Ritual	Released: 17 January 2011; Label: Fiction (#2751636); Formats: CD, LP, digital download	3	21	4	2	123	10	3	3	19	95	BPI: Silver
Big TV	Released: 12 August 2013; Label: Fiction (#3740906); Formats: CD, LP, digital download	4	23	14	10	129	19	12	11	3	— (Note: Big TV did not enter the US Billboard 200, but peaked at number 166 on the US Top Current Albums Chart.)	
Friends	Released: 7 October 2016; Label: BMG; Formats: CD, LP, digital download	11	59	11	—	194	40	32	15	50	—	
Five	Released: 1 February 2019; Label: PIAS; Formats: CD, LP, digital download	14	30	9	—	— (Note: Five did not enter the France Albums Chart but peaked at number 194 on the French Physical Albums Chart.)	18	12	11	15	—	
As I Try Not to Fall Apart	Released: 18 February 2022; Label: PIAS; Formats: CD, LP, digital download	14	45	16	—	—	36	9	6	23	—	
Night Light	Released: 7 November 2025; Label: PIAS; Formats: CD, LP, digital download	29	—	—	—	— (Note: Night Light did not enter the official Top French Albums chart, but peaked at number 186 on the Top French Physical Albums chart.)	—	—	14	—	—	
"—" denotes a release that did not chart.

== Extended plays ==
Title	EP details	Peak chart positions	
Title	EP details	UK Indie	FRA
Unfinished Business	Released: 28 April 2008; Label: Chess Club	34	—
The Remixes	Released: 17 April 2010; Label: Fiction	—	—
White Lies Amazon Artist Lounge	Released: 29 July 2013; Label: Polydor	—	133
There Goes Our Love Again Remixes	Released: 23 August 2013; Label: Polydor	—	—
Small TV	Released: 6 November 2013; Label: Fiction	—	—
"—" denotes a release that did not chart.

== Singles ==
Single	Year	Peak chart positions										Certifications	Album
Single	Year	UK	AUT	BEL	CZ	DEN	MEX	NLD	POL	SCO	SWI	Certifications	Album
"Routemaster" (as Fear of Flying)	2006	—	—	—	—	—	—	—	—	—	—		Non-album singles
"Three's A Crowd"/"Forget-Me-Nots" (as Fear of Flying)	2006	—	—	—	—	—	—	—	—	—	—		Non-album singles
"Unfinished Business"	2008	—	—	—	—	—	—	—	—	—	—		To Lose My Life...
"Death"	2008	52	—	— (Note: "Death" did not enter the Ultratop 50, but peaked at three on the Ultratip chart.)	—	—	30	—	35	8	—		To Lose My Life...
"To Lose My Life"	2009	34	—	— (Note: "To Lose My Life" did not enter the Ultratop 50, but peaked at 18 on the Ultratip chart.)	65	— (Note: "To Lose My Life" did not enter the Denmark Top 40, but peaked at seven on the Denmark Airplay chart.)	28	—	43	4	70		To Lose My Life...
"Farewell to the Fairground"	2009	33	—	— (Note: "Farewell to the Fairground" did not enter the Ultratop 50, but peaked at six on the Ultratip chart.)	—	—	—	83	1	9	—	BPI: Silver	To Lose My Life...
"Death" (re-release)	2009	174	—	—	—	—	—	—	—	20	—		To Lose My Life...
"Bigger than Us"	2011	42	46	36	—	38	25	45	48	42	96		Ritual
"Strangers"	2011	—	—	— (Note: "Strangers" did not enter the Ultratop 50, but peaked at eight on the Ultratip chart.)	—	—	—	—	44	—	—		Ritual
"Holy Ghost"	2011	— (Note: "Holy Ghost" did not enter the UK Singles Chart, but peaked at number nine on the UK Physical Singles Chart.)	—	—	—	—	—	—	—	—	—		Ritual
"The Power & the Glory"	2011	—	—	—	—	—	—	—	—	—	—		Ritual
"There Goes Our Love Again"	2013	— (Note: "There Goes Our Love Again" did not enter the UK Singles Chart, but peaked at number three on the UK Physical Singles Chart.)	—	— (Note: "There Goes Our Love Again" did not enter the Ultratop 50, but peaked at 30 on the Ultratip chart.)	—	—	38	—	—	—	—		Big TV
"First Time Caller"	2013	—	—	— (Note: "First Time Caller" did not enter the Ultratop 50, but peaked at 54 on the Ultratip chart.)	—	—	—	—	—	—	—		Big TV
"Take It Out on Me"	2016	—	—	— (Note: "Take It Out on Me" did not enter the Ultratop 50, but charted as an "extra tip" on the Ultratip chart.)	—	—	—	—	—	—	—		Friends
"Come On"	2016	—	—	—	—	—	—	—	—	—	—		Friends
"Morning in LA"	2016	—	—	— (Note: "Morning in LA" did not enter the Ultratop 50, but charted as an "extra tip" on the Ultratip chart.)	—	—	—	—	—	—	—		Friends
"Hold Back Your Love"	2016	—	—	—	—	—	43	—	—	—	—		Friends
"Don't Want to Feel It All"	2017	—	—	—	—	—	—	—	—	—	—		Friends
"Time to Give"	2018	—	—	—	—	—	—	— (Note: "Time to Give" did not enter the Netherlands' Single Top 100 but peaked on the Netherlands' Airplay Chart at number 43.)	—	—	—		Five
"Believe It"	2018	—	—	—	—	—	—	—	—	—	—		Five
"Finish Line"	2018	—	—	—	—	—	—	—	—	—	—		Five
"Tokyo"	2019	—	—	—	—	—	19	— (Note: "Tokyo" did not enter the Netherlands' Single Top 100 but peaked on the Netherlands' Airplay Chart at number 49.)	—	—	—		Five
"Hurt My Heart"	2019	—	—	— (Note: "Hurt My Heart" did not enter the Ultratop 50, but charted as an "extra tip" on the Ultratip chart.)	—	—	—	—	—	—	—		Five
"As I Try Not to Fall Apart"	2021	—	—	—	—	—	—	—	—	—	—		As I Try Not to Fall Apart
"I Don't Want to Go to Mars"	2021	—	—	—	—	—	—	—	—	—	—		As I Try Not to Fall Apart
"Am I Really Going to Die"	2022	—	—	—	—	—	—	—	—	—	—		As I Try Not to Fall Apart
"Blue Drift"	2022	—	—	—	—	—	—	—	—	—	—		As I Try Not to Fall Apart
"Trouble In America"	2022	—	—	—	—	—	—	—	—	—	—		As I Try Not to Fall Apart
"Breakdown Days"	2022	—	—	—	—	—	—	—	—	—	—		As I Try Not to Fall Apart
"Nothing On Me"	2025	—	—	—	—	—	—	—	—	—	—		Night Light
"In the Middle"	2025	—	—	—	—	—	—	—	—	—	—		Night Light
"Keep Up"	2025	—	—	—	—	—	—	—	—	—	—		Night Light
"—" denotes singles that did not chart, have not yet charted, or were not released.

== Promotional singles ==
Single	Year	Peak chart positions	Album
Single	Year	MEX	Album
"From the Stars" (Note: iTunes UK 'Free Single of the Week' for the week of 29 December 2008.)	2008	–	To Lose My Life...
"Taxidermy"	2009	–	—N/a
"Getting Even"	2013	48	Big TV

=== As featured artist ===
Title	Year	Album
"Embrace" (Chase & Status featuring White Lies)	2011	No More Idols

== Music videos ==
Title	Year	Director(s)
"Unfinished Business"	2008	Simon Green
"Death" (Note: A music video was also made for the Crystal Castles remix.)	2008	Andreas Nilsson
"To Lose My Life"	2009	Andreas Nilsson
"Farewell to the Fairground"	2009	Andreas Nilsson
"Bigger than Us"	2010	Jonas & François
"Strangers"	2011	Stephen Agnew
"Holy Ghost"	2011	Canada
"The Power & the Glory"	2011	
"There Goes Our Love Again"	2013	James Slater
"First Time Caller"	2013	Nicolas Davenel
"Take It Out on Me"	2016	David Pablos
"Morning in LA"	2016	Chris Hugall
"Don't Want to Feel It All"	2016	Alex Alvarez
"Believe It"	2018	David Pablos
"Tokyo"	2019	David Pablos
"As I Try Not to Fall Apart"	2021	
"I Don't Want to Go to Mars"	2021	
"Am I Really Going to Die"	2022	Balan Evans
"In the Middle"	2025	Andreas Nilsson
