= List of songs recorded by White Lies =

White Lies performing at The Roundhouse in 2013.

This is a list of songs recorded by the band White Lies.

To date, the band has released seven studio albums; To Lose My Life... (2009), Ritual (2011), Big TV (2013), Friends (2016), Five (2019), As I Try Not to Fall Apart (2022) and Night Light (2025).

Prior to being known as White Lies, the band released two singles under the name of Fear of Flying.

== Songs ==
Key
•	Indicates single release

Name of song, album or single and year of release
Song	Album or Single	Year	Notes	Ref.
"A Place to Hide"	To Lose My Life...	2009		
"All the Best"	Night Light	2025		
"Am I Really Gonna Die" •	As I Try Not to Fall Apart	2022		
"As I Try Not to Fall Apart" •	As I Try Not to Fall Apart	2022		
"Bad Love"	Ritual	2011		
"Be Your Man"	Big TV	2013		
"Believe It" •	Five	2019		
"Big TV"	Big TV	2013		
"Bigger than Us" •	Ritual	2011		
"Black Song"	"Death"	2008	Later included on the 2009 iTunes and 2019 10th Anniversary editions of To Lose My Life....	
"Blue Drift" •	As I Try Not to Fall Apart	2022		
"Breakdown Days" •	As I Try Not to Fall Apart	2022	Only included on digital Bonus edition.	
"Breathe"	As I Try Not to Fall Apart	2022		
"Change"	Big TV	2013		
"Come Down"	Ritual	2011		
"Come On" •	Friends	2016		
"Death" •	To Lose My Life...	2008	First released as a single in 2008 and later included on the band's 2009 debut album.	
"Denial"	Five	2019		
"Don't Fall"	Friends	2016		
"Don't Want to Feel It All" •	Friends	2016		
"E.S.T."	To Lose My Life...	2009		
"Everything is OK"	Night Light	2025		
"Falling Out Without Me" •	Five	2019	Only included on the digital Five V2 re-issue.	
"Farewell to the Fairground" •	To Lose My Life...	2009		
"Fifty On Our Foreheads"	To Lose My Life...	2009		
"Finish Line" •	Five	2019		
"Fire and Wings"	Five	2019		
"First Time Caller" •	Big TV	2013		
"Forget Me Nots" (as Fear of Flying)	"Three's a Crowd"	2006		
"Friends"	Friends	2016	Initially only included on the Cassette box set and Japanese editions of the album. Later released on the expanded digital edition in 2017.	
"From the Stars"	To Lose My Life...	2009		
"Getting Even"	Big TV	2013		
"Give a Sign"	Friends	2016	Initially only included on the Cassette box set and Japanese editions of the album. Later released on the expanded digital edition in 2017.	
"Give It Up"	Spirit of Talk Talk	2012	Talk Talk cover.	
"Going Nowhere"	Night Light	2025		
"Goldmine"	Big TV	2013		
"Heaven Wait"	Big TV	2013		
"Hold Back Your Love" •	Friends	2016		
"Holy Ghost" •	Ritual	2011		
"Hurt My Heart" •	Five	2019	Only included on the digital Five V2 re-issue.	
"I Don't Want to Go to Mars" •	As I Try Not to Fall Apart	2022		
"I Just Wanna Win One Time"	Night Light	2025		
"I Love(d) New York"	Night Light	2025	Only included on digital Expanded edition.	
"In the Middle" •	Night Light	2025		
"Is Love"	Ritual	2011		
"Is My Love Enough?"	Friends	2016		
"Jo?"	Five	2019		
"Juice"	Night Light	2025		
"Keep Up" •	Night Light	2025		
"Kick Me"	Five	2019		
"Love Lockdown"	"Farewell to the Fairground"	2009	Kanye West cover. Recorded live for BBC Radio 1 Live Lounge.	
"Morning in LA" •	Friends	2016		
"Mother Tongue"	Big TV	2013		
"My Lover" •	Night Light	2025	Only included on digital Expanded edition.	
"Never Alone"	Five	2019		
"Night Light"	Night Light	2025		
"Nothing on Me" •	Night Light	2025		
"Nothing to Give"	To Lose My Life...	2009		
"Peace & Quiet"	Ritual	2011		
"Quiet Times (Shadow of Myself)" (Tube & Berger vs. White Lies)	We Are All Stars	2017		
"Ragworm"	As I Try Not to Fall Apart	2022		
"Right Place"	Friends	2016		
"Roll December"	As I Try Not to Fall Apart	2022		
"Round Three" (as Fear of Flying)	"Routemaster"	2006		
"Routemaster" (as Fear of Flying)	"Routemaster"	2006		
"Seventeen" (Joris Voorn with Yotto and White Lies)	Serotonin	2025		
"Son of a Gun"	Friends	2016	Only included on the cassette box set edition of the album.	
"Staring at the Sun"	As I Try Not to Fall Apart	2022	Only included on digital Bonus edition.	
"Step Outside"	As I Try Not to Fall Apart	2022		
"Strangers" •	Ritual	2011		
"Streetlights"	Ritual	2011		
"Summer Didn't Change a Thing"	Friends	2016		
"Swing"	Friends	2016		
"Take It Out on Me" •	Friends	2016		
"The End"	As I Try Not to Fall Apart	2022		
"The Power & The Glory" •	Ritual	2011		
"The Price of Love"	To Lose My Life...	2009		
"There Goes Our Love Again" •	Big TV	2013		
"There is No Cure for It"	As I Try Not to Fall Apart	2022		
"Three's a Crowd" (as Fear of Flying)	"Three's a Crowd"	2006		
"Time to Give" •	Five	2019		
"To Lose My Life" •	To Lose My Life...	2009		
"Tokyo" •	Five	2019		
"Tricky to Love"	Big TV	2013		
"Trouble in America" •	As I Try Not to Fall Apart	2022	Only included on digital Bonus edition.	
"Turn the Bells"	Ritual	2011		
"Unfinished Business" •	To Lose My Life...	2008	First released as a single in 2008 and re-recorded for the band's 2009 debut album. Original version appears on the 2019 10th Snniversary edition.	
"What I Need"	Friends	2016	Initially only included on the Cassette box set and Japanese editions of the album. Later released on the expanded digital edition in 2017.	
"What If We're Bad Together"	As I Try Not to Fall Apart	2022	Only included on digital Bonus edition.	
"Where Do I Go?"	Friends	2016	Initially only included on the Cassette box set and Japanese editions of the album. Later released on the expanded digital edition in 2017.	
"You Still Love Him"	"Unfinished Business"	2008	Originally recorded under the name "One Night Friend" when the band was known as Fear of Flying, and only released through a promo CD. Later included on the 2009 iTunes and 2019 10th Anniversary editions of To Lose My Life....	
