= The Remixes (White Lies EP) =

EP by White Lies
- Released: 17 April 2010
- Genre: Indie rock, post-punk revival
- Length: 26:07
- Label: Fiction

White Lies chronology
Unfinished Business (2008)	The Remixes (2010)

The Remixes is an EP by British indie rock band White Lies, released on 17 April 2010 by Fiction Records. The EP was released as part of the 2010 Record Store Day, and limited to 500 copies.

The material, all previously unavailable, consists of remixes of songs taken from the band's debut studio album, To Lose My Life... The final track, "Unfinished Business", was remixed by Jorge Elbrect, lead vocalist and guitarist of Violens, a New York psychedelic rock band who supported White Lies on many of their To Lose My Life... tour dates in the U.K.

The artwork for The Remixes is identical to that of To Lose My Life..., except for the colour, which is inverted.

== Track listing ==
All music is composed by White Lies

No.	Title	Length
1.	"Nothing to Give (M83 Remix)"	6:23
2.	"Farewell to the Fairground (Rory Phillips White Horse Mix)"	4:54
3.	"Death (Chase & Status Remix)"	4:53
4.	"A Place to Hide (Autre Monde Remix)"	6:22
5.	"Unfinished Business (Jorge Elbrecht of Violens Remix)"	4:14
