= Tokyo (White Lies song) =

Single by White Lies

from the album Five
- B-side: "Tokyo" (album version)
- Released: 10 January 2019
- Genre: Synth-pop; dance-rock; arena rock; new wave; disco
- Length: 4:52
- Label: Fiction
- Songwriter(s): Harry McVeigh; Charles Cave; Jack Lawrence-Brown
- Producer(s): Ed Buller; Flood

White Lies singles chronology
"Finish Line" (2018)	"Tokyo" (2019)	"Hurt My Heart" (2019)

Audio sample
- file; help

Music video
- "Tokyo" on YouTube

"Tokyo" is the fourth single off of White Lies' fifth studio album, Five. The single was released three weeks prior to Five's release, on 10 January 2019, and was released with a corresponding music video.

== Style and composition ==
In an interview with Mark Millar of XS Noize, the band said of "Tokyo" that when they were writing it "we had been listening to some cheesy 80s ballads and based the foundation of that song on that."

== Music video ==
On 10 January 2019, along with the single, the music video was released. The music video was filmed during July 2018 in Tijuana, Mexico. The music video was directed by David Pablos, who also directed the music video for the band's previous single, "Time to Give". In an interview with Dork, Harry McVeigh described the band as "lucky" to work with Pablos and felt the music video was their best since their music video, "Death", which was on their debut album, To Lose My Life... back in 2009.

In further describing their work with Pablos, McVeigh told Sam Taylor in Dork magazine that Pablos' "unique knowledge of the area affording us access into some of the city's most stunning and bizarre locations helps bring to life his vision of stories of love and loss."

== Critical reception ==
Peter Robinson of Popjustice named "Tokyo" as their song of the week for 11 January 2019. Robinson praised the chorus and summed up the song as being orchestrated in a very professional manner.

Writing for XS Noize, Mark Millar described "Tokyo" as a "triumphant synth-laden pop nous". Millar further said that the single "encapsulates the trio’s unerring knack of penning a big tune".

== Track listing ==
No.	Title	Length
1.	"Tokyo" (single version)	3:42
2.	"Tokyo" (album version)	4:53
Total length:		9:45

== See also ==
- List of songs about Tokyo
