= Five (White Lies album) =

Studio album by White Lies
- Released: 1 February 2019
- Recorded: 2018
- Genre: Synth-pop
- Length: 42:07
- Label: PIAS
- Producer: White Lies

White Lies chronology
Friends (2016)	Five (2019)	As I Try Not to Fall Apart (2022)

Singles from Five
- 1. "Time to Give" Released: 17 September 2018; 2. "Believe It" Released: 24 October 2018; 3. "Finish Line" Released: 4 December 2018; 4. "Tokyo" Released: 10 January 2019; 5. "Hurt My Heart" Released: 25 September 2019; 6. "Falling Out Without Me" Released: 8 November 2019

Five (stylised as FIVE or ⠋⠊⠧⠑ in Braille) is the fifth studio album by British post-punk band, White Lies. The album was released on 1 February 2019 through PIAS.

Following the tour for their previous album, Friends, White Lies began writing material for their fifth studio album, and entered the studio to record in the Spring and Summer 2018. The album and corresponding lead single, "Time to Give" were jointly announced on 17 September 2018. Three more singles and two music videos were released prior to the February release of the album, including "Believe It" and "Tokyo".

On review aggregator sites such as Album of the Year and Metacritic, Five has enjoyed the highest aggregate ratings of any album the band has released.

== Background and recording ==
During the fall of 2017, the Friends Tour wrapped up, and towards the final month of touring, White Lies began writing new songs for their next studio album. In a September 2017 interview with Digital Spy Harry McVeigh said that the band planned to begin recording in 2018 for their next album. Ahead of recording, McVeigh also said sound-wise, the demos for Five had more guitar emphasis than synthesizer emphasis, which was a bit of a departure from their previous couple albums. "Listening to the songs we have already, they are quite a bit more guitar-heavy than the demos we had for the last album."

During this time, the band's contract with BMG ended leaving them stranded to find another record label before working on a new album. Lead singer, Harry McVeigh, described the period between BMG and PIAS as stressful saying "there was a little bit of pressure, we self-funded it so after we recorded the record we were thinking, ‘Oh fuck, are we actually going to get a record deal?'" In an interview with Josh Williams and Dork magazine, bassist Charles Cave revealed that BMG pressured them to create more radio-friendly music in order to profit for the new German investors for BMG. Cave said in regards to new contract negotiations that "we just didn't pursue it. We knew it would take too long to sort it out, so we just went elsewhere." In early to mid-2018, White Lies signed a new record contract with PIAS Recordings.

After signing with PIAS the band began working to record new material for Five (then unnamed). Recording was undertaken Spring and Summer of 2018, the band began recording the fifth album. Originally looking to court Blake Mills as a producer for Five, White Lies recruited Ed Buller, who produced the bands first and third albums, To Lose My Life... and Big TV to produce the album. Buller was recruited to produce the album help the band captivate the sound of To Lose My Life... and Big TV while allowing the band to have more autonomy in their songwriting process.

Recording for the album took place in London and in San Francisco, where the band lives on a part-time basis. The process of recording, McVeigh said, involved "a lot of transatlantic flying. I came back for two, maybe three long sessions with Charles, coming back for a month at a time, and we wrote as much as possible in that time."

== Music and composition ==
In describing the recording McVeigh felt the album has more eclectic and guitar-dominated influences to allow for a more varied record. "We thought it would be something that would work, to have these songs pull you off in a number of different tangents, and taking you to different places. And the production leans towards more guitars on the album. It’s a bit heavier, like how we explored on our first two albums. And we tried to do a few stranger things, with songs like ‘Time To Give’, which was the first song we released."

In describing the sound of Five, Jack Parker, writing for All Things Loud said the album is loaded with "sprawling synth arpeggios" and called the album "the trio's most experimental and complex collections to date".

In an interview with Mark Millar of XS Noize, McVeigh said of "Tokyo" that when they were writing it "we had been listening to some cheesy 80s ballads and based the foundation of that song on that." McVeigh also said that he felt that "Never Alone" sounds similar to Joy Division and New Order.

== Release and promotion ==
=== Singles ===
The album was first announced by the band on 17 September 2018 with the corresponding release of their first single, "Time to Give", which clocked in at 7 minutes, the longest single by the band to date. That same day the release date of 1 February 2019 was announced, as well as the Spring 2019 European tour. On the new album, White Lies described the album as a milestone in their career, as they have been active for a decade. "It marks our decade as a band, which has pushed us to expand our sound and reach new territory artistically — it marks the start of a new and exciting chapter for us."

The second single released was "Believe It" which became available for listening on 24 October 2018. Writing for Clash, Robin Murray described "Believe It" as "rousing, anthemic post-punk inclined songwriting, [that] actually deals with therapy, and the differing perspectives that exist around it." Murray further described "Believe It" as an "emphatic" track.

On 1 February 2019, Five was released on vinyl, CD, and was made available for download and streaming.

The album is reissued on 9 November 2019 as FIVE V2 with two additional tracks.

=== Music videos ===
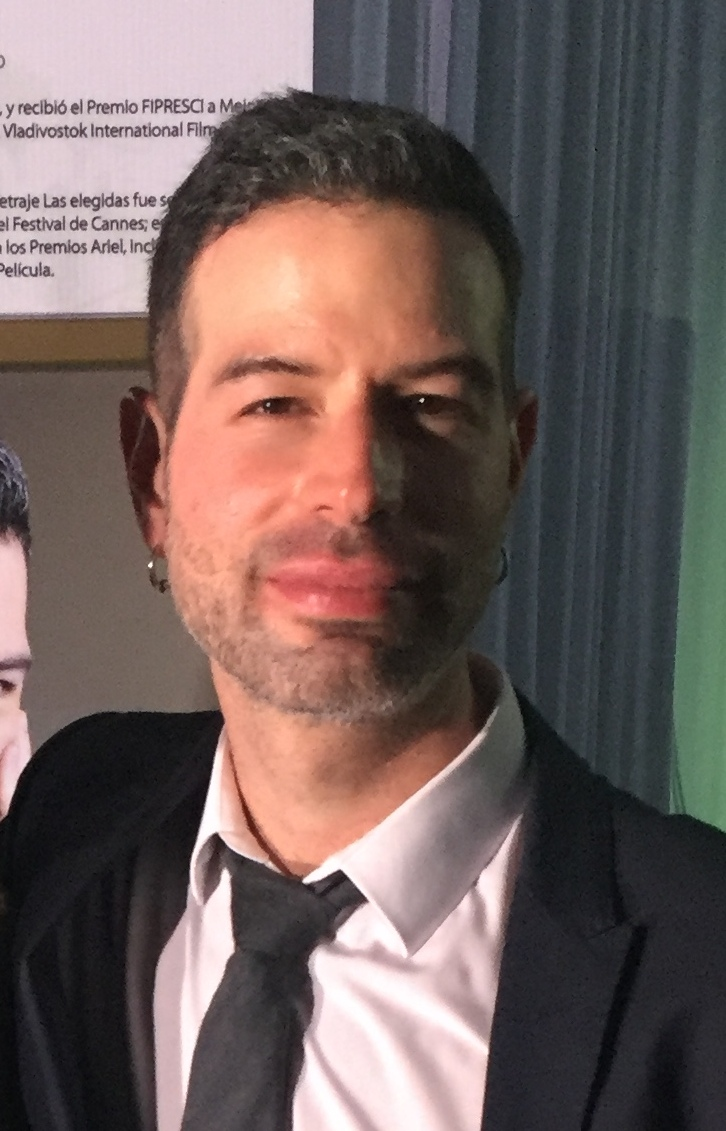
David Pablos (pictured) directed the music videos for "Believe It" and "Tokyo" in his hometown of Tijuana, Mexico.

On 1 December 2018, the music video for "Believe It" was released. The music video for "Believe It" was aired on the band's YouTube channel on 26 November 2018, and publicly released for television on 1 December 2018. The video was directed by Mexican film director, David Pablos, who is known for his previous works such as The Chosen Ones. The video was produced by Ivan Diaz Robledo and Paulina Valencia.

Filming for the music video took place in Pablos' home town of Tijuana, Baja California, Mexico. Pablos had previously directed the music video for "Take It Out On Me" from their fourth studio album, Friends.

On 10 January 2019, the music video for "Tokyo" was released. The music video was filmed during July 2018 in Tijuana, Mexico. The music video was directed by David Pablos, who also directed the music video for the band's previous single, "Time to Give". In an interview with Dork, Harry McVeigh described the band as "lucky" to work with Pablos and felt the music video was their best since their music video, "Death", which was on their debut album, To Lose My Life... back in 2009.

In further describing their work with Pablos, McVeigh told Sam Taylor in Dork magazine that Pablos' "unique knowledge of the area affording us access into some of the city's most stunning and bizarre locations helps bring to life his vision of stories of love and loss."

== Critical reception ==
Professional ratings
Aggregate scores
Source	Rating
Metacritic	79/100
Review scores
Source	Rating
DIY	3/5 stars
Exclaim!	8/10
Mojo	4/5 stars
The Skinny	4/5 stars

At Metacritic, which assigns a normalised rating out of 100 to reviews from mainstream publications, the album received an average score of 79, based on five reviews, indicating "generally favorable reviews".

== Track listing ==
No.	Title	Length
1.	"Time to Give"	7:34
2.	"Never Alone"	3:33
3.	"Finish Line"	4:45
4.	"Kick Me"	5:31
5.	"Tokyo"	4:52
6.	"Jo?"	3:06
7.	"Denial"	4:24
8.	"Believe It"	3:29
9.	"Fire and Wings"	4:44
Total length:		41:58

FIVE V2 reissue bonus tracks
No.	Title	Length
10.	"Hurt My Heart"	4:14
11.	"Falling Out Without Me"	4:18
Total length:		50:30

== Personnel ==
- Ed Buller – co-production
- Flood – co-production
- James Brown – engineering
- Alan Moulder – mixing
- Casey Roarty – Design / Art Direction

== Charts ==
Chart (2019)	Peak position
Austrian Albums (Ö3 Austria)	30
Belgian Albums (Ultratop Flanders)	9
Belgian Albums (Ultratop Wallonia)	89
Dutch Albums (Album Top 100)	12
German Albums (Offizielle Top 100)	18
Scottish Albums (Official Charts)	11
UK Albums (Official Charts)	14
UK Album Downloads (Official Charts)	8
UK Independent Albums (Official Charts)	1
US Independent Albums (Billboard)	18

== Release history ==
Release dates and formats for Five
Region	Date	Label(s)	Format(s)	Catalogue No.
United Kingdom & Europe	1 February 2019	PIAS	CD	PIASR445CDX
United Kingdom & Europe	1 February 2019	PIAS	LP	PIASR445LP
United Kingdom & Europe	1 February 2019	PIAS	LP (Blue vinyl)	PIASR445LPX
United Kingdom & Europe	1 February 2019	PIAS	Digital download	—N/a
United Kingdom & Europe	8 November 2019	PIAS	Digital download (Five V2 edition)	—N/a
