= Hold Back Your Love =

Hold Back Your Love may refer to:

- "Hold Back Your Love", song by Magnum from Vigilante (Magnum album)
- "Hold Back Your Love", song by White Lies from Friends (White Lies album)
