= Take It Out on Me =

Take It Out on Me may refer to:

- "Take It Out on Me", a song by Florida Georgia Line from the album Here's to the Good Times (2012)
- "Take It Out on Me", a song by White Lies from the album Friends (2016)
- "Take It Out on Me", a song by Justin Bieber from the album Changes (2020)
- "Take It Out on Me", a song by OneRepublic from the album Human (2021)
