= Believe It (White Lies song) =

Single by White Lies

from the album Five
- Released: 24 October 2018
- Length: 3:30
- Label: Fiction
- Songwriters: Harry McVeigh; Charles Cave
- Producers: Ed Buller; Flood

White Lies singles chronology
"Time to Give" (2018)	"Believe It" (2018)	"Finish Line" (2018)

"Believe It" (stylised as "⠃⠑⠇⠊⠑⠧⠑ ⠊⠞" in Braille) is the second single off of White Lies' fifth studio album, Five. The single was released on 24 October 2018 through PIAS Recordings.

== Background ==
The second single released was "Believe It" which became available for listening on 24 October 2018.

== Music video ==
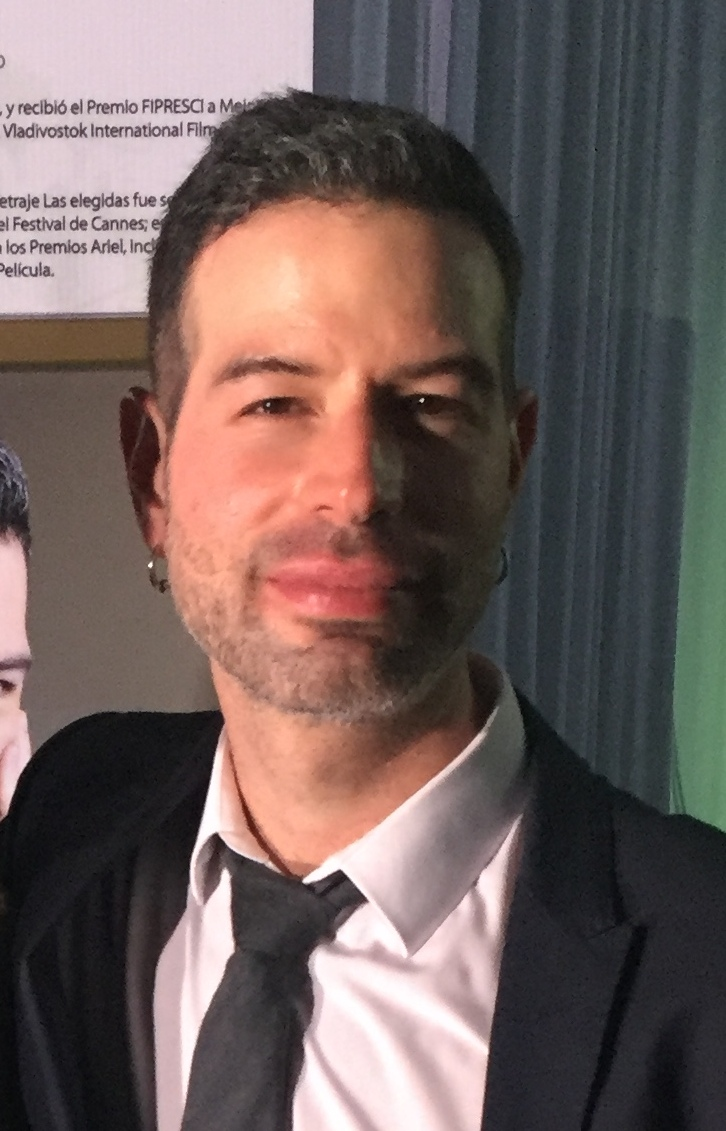
David Pablos (pictured) directed the music video for "Believe It".

The music video for "Believe It" was posted on the band's YouTube channel on 26 November 2018, and publicly released for television on 1 December 2018. The video was directed by Mexican film director, David Pablos, who is known for his previous works such as The Chosen Ones. The video was produced by Ivan Diaz Robledo and Paulina Valencia.

Filming for the music video took place in Pablos' home town of Tijuana, Baja California, Mexico. Pablos had previously directed the music video for "Take It Out On Me" from their fourth studio album, Friends.

== Critical reception ==
Writing for Clash, Robin Murray described "Believe It" as "rousing, anthemic post-punk inclined songwriting, [that] actually deals with therapy, and the differing perspectives that exist around it." Murray further described "Believe It" as an "emphatic" track.

== Track listing ==
No.	Title	Length
1.	"Believe It"	3:30
Total length:		3:30
