= Paulina Valencia =

Paulina Valencia Gutiérrez is a Mexican film and music video producer.

== Early life ==
Valencia was born and raised in Tijuana.

== Career ==
She began her career with the Tijuana-based production company, Spécola, where she produced Navajazo, which won the Pardo d'oro Cineasti del presente (Golden Leopard – Filmmakers of the Present) competition at the 2014 Locarno Film Festival. She then took an executive producing role at Pimienta Films, before moving on to co-found Kintsugi Cine. In 2024, Valencia boarded The Weird, Nicolasa Ruiz’s first feature film. Valencia is also a producer on the upcoming Matt Porterfield film, Solo Tengo Sed.

== Awards and accolades ==
With Navajazo, Valencia became the youngest producer to ever win a Locarno Golden Leopard.

== Filmography ==
=== Film ===
Year	Title	Producer	Notes
2014	Navajazo	Yes	
2016	Willam, the New Judo Master	Yes	
2019	JR	Yes	short film
2020	Obachan	Yes	short film
2023	Sorcery	Yes	
2023	Chupa	Yes	
2024	My Eyes	Yes	
TBD	Solo Tengo Sed	Yes	
TBD	The Weird	Yes	

=== Music videos ===
Year	Aritist	Song	Producer	Notes
2018	White Lies	"Tokyo"	Yes	
2018	White Lies	"Believe It"	Yes	
2025	Julieta Venegas	"La Nostalgia"	Yes	
