= Team Waterpolo =

English indie pop band

Team Waterpolo were an English indie pop band who formed in Preston, England, formed in July 2007. The NME made their debut single "Letting Go" its 'Single of the Week', and gave them a place on their New Noise Tour alongside Crystal Castles, Friendly Fires and White Lies. The band signed to Epic Records in August 2008, beating off competition from numerous other record labels, only to be dropped less than 18 months later.

== History ==
The band consisted of Fred Davis on vocals, Nathan Standlee on guitar, Ruggero Lorenzini as DJ, and Lex Dunn on drums. "Letting Go", the first track written by the band, attracted the attention of Myspace, who made them their featured artist of the week. This exposure resulted in the band getting considerable industry interest before they had even played a gig, with several A&R representatives attending their debut live show in their native Preston. In February 2008 Team Waterpolo released the track as a single on Moshi Moshi Records, with "Problematic Girls" as a B-side, which was also included on a compilation released by CatCutter Records later that year.

Team Waterpolo have supported Joe Lean and the Jing Jang Jong, Black Kids, The Wombats and Supergrass. Their next single "So Called Summer" was recorded at the countryside studio used by Alex Turner for his Mercury shortlisted The Last Shadow Puppets, and was released on 27 October 2008. It received a three-star rating from DIY Magazine. The band did a UK headline tour, which ended in their hometown.

The band also undertook another tour, playing venues such as Liverpool Barfly, being supported by Defend Moscow and Sampras. They were the winners of the Steve Lamacq Rebel Playlist in September 2008. In May 2009 they released their new single "Room 44".

In October 2009, Team Waterpolo announced their break up as a band, after being dropped by Epic. The debut album they recorded while signed has yet to be released. Nathan has since moved back to his native United States. Since 2018, Freddie has been producing and playing guitar in the band The Ringards
