= Morning in LA =

Single by White Lies

from the album Friends
- Released: 29 September 2016
- Recorded: February–March 2016
- Studio: Studio One, London; The Distillery, Bath
- Length: 3:20
- Label: BMG
- Songwriters: Harry McVeigh; Charles Cave; Jack Lawrence-Brown

White Lies singles chronology
"Come On" (2016)	"Morning in LA" (2016)	"Hold Back Your Love" (2016)

Music video
- "Morning in LA" on YouTube

"Morning in LA" is a song by English band White Lies. It was released as the third single from their fourth studio album, Friends, on 29 September 2016.

== Music video ==
The music video for "Morning in LA" was released on 17 November 2016. The music video features montages of the band playing and of the city of Los Angeles. The video was directed by Chris Hugall.

Hugall described the music video as a "tongue-in-cheek homage to all things 80s goth-pop", in reference to the band gothic rock roots. The production company for the music video was Nice & Polite and it was produced by Matt Frost and Ross Anderson.

In a staff article for Dork magazine, the music video was described as an "80's reboot".

== Charts ==
Chart (2016)	Peak position
Belgium (Ultratop Bubbling Under Wallonia)	98
