= Night Light (White Lies album) =

Studio album by White Lies
- Released: 7 November 2025
- Studio: The Church Studios
- Genres: Indie rock; new wave; post-punk revival
- Length: 44:03
- Label: PIAS
- Producer: Riley MacIntyre

White Lies chronology
As I Try Not to Fall Apart (2022)	Night Light (2025)

Singles from Night Light
- 1. "Nothing on Me" Released: 21 May 2025; 2. "In the Middle" Released: 16 July 2025; 3. "Keep Up" Released: 17 September 2025; 4. "My Lover" Released: 24 April 2026

Night Light is the seventh studio album by British post-punk band White Lies. The album was released on 7 November 2025 through PIAS.

== Critical reception ==
Professional ratings
Aggregate scores
Source	Rating
Metacritic	65/100
Review scores
Source	Rating
AllMusic	3.5/5 stars
The Skinny	4/5 stars

The album achieved a metascore on Metacritic of 65, indicating "generally favorable reviews".

Magazine The Skinny called Night Light "one of their best [albums] yet". AllMusic described the album as "a fine addition to their reliable late-era catalog that keeps it engaging, impeccably produced, and emotionally earnest".

== Track listing ==
All tracks are written by White Lies.

Night Light track listing
No.	Title	Length
1.	"Nothing on Me"	2:41
2.	"All the Best"	5:58
3.	"Keep Up"	3:36
4.	"Juice"	4:29
5.	"Everything is OK"	5:18
6.	"Going Nowhere"	5:33
7.	"Night Light"	4:45
8.	"I Just Wanna Win One Time"	4:38
9.	"In the Middle"	6:05
Total length:		44:03

Digital expanded edition bonus tracks
No.	Title	Length
11.	"My Lover"	5:22
12.	"I Love(d) New York"	4:40
Total length:		54:05

== Personnel ==
Credits taken from album liner notes.

=== Recording ===
- All tracks performed by White Lies and Seth Evans, additional Saxophone on tracks 1, 2, 6, 8 and 9 by Nat Philipps.
- All tracks produced by Riley MacIntyre, assisted by Balázs Altsach and James Poucher.
- All tracks mixed by Chris Coady.
- All tracks mastered by Joe La Porta.

=== Artwork and packaging ===
- Album sleeve design by Annelise Kestra and Rob Crane.
- Photography by Jono White and Phil Hewitt.

== Charts ==
Chart performance for Night Light
Chart (2025)	Peak position
French Physical Albums (SNEP)	186
Scottish Albums (Official Charts)	14
UK Albums (Official Charts)	29
UK Album Downloads (Official Charts)	11
UK Album Sales (Official Charts)	6
UK Independent Albums (Official Charts)	2

== Release history ==
Release dates and formats for Night Light
Region	Date	Label(s)	Format(s)	Catalogue No.
United Kingdom	7 November 2025	PIAS	CD	PIASR1603CD
United Kingdom	7 November 2025	PIAS	Cassette (Red)	PIASR1603CA
United Kingdom	7 November 2025	PIAS	LP	PIASR1603LP
United Kingdom	7 November 2025	PIAS	LP (Marble vinyl) (Note: Exclusive fan club release.)	PIASR1603LPM
United Kingdom	7 November 2025	PIAS	LP (Red vinyl)	PIASR1603LPR
United Kingdom	7 November 2025	PIAS	LP (Clear vinyl)	PIASR1603LPX
United Kingdom	7 November 2025	PIAS; Blood Records	LP (Mulberry with Blue & White Marble vinyl)	BLOOD519
Worldwide	12 November 2025 (iTunes exclusive)	PIAS	Digital download (Expanded edition)	—N/a
Worldwide	22 January 2026 (All streaming platforms)	PIAS	Digital download (Expanded edition)	—N/a
