= As I Try Not to Fall Apart =

Studio album by White Lies
- Released: 18 February 2022
- Length: 47:28
- Label: PIAS
- Producers: White Lies; Ed Buller; Claudius Mittendorfer

White Lies chronology
Five (2019)	As I Try Not to Fall Apart (2022)	Night Light (2025)

Singles from As I Try Not to Fall Apart
- 1. "As I Try Not to Fall Apart" Released: 27 September 2021; 2. "I Don't Want to Go to Mars" Released: 1 December 2021; 3. "Am I Really Going to Die" Released: 17 January 2022; 4. "Blue Drift" Released: 14 February 2022; 5. "Trouble In America" Released: 14 September 2022; 6. "Breakdown Days" Released: 13 October 2022

Professional ratings
Aggregate scores
Source	Rating
Metacritic	68/100
Review scores
Source	Rating
AllMusic	3.5/5 stars
DIY	3.5/5 stars
Dork	3/5 stars
Gigwise	7/10 stars
MORS - Radio UG	4.5/5 stars

As I Try Not to Fall Apart is the sixth studio album by British post-punk band White Lies. The album was released on 18 February 2022 through PIAS. The Bonus Edition of the album was released on 21 October 2022 and features 4 additional tracks.

The album had four singles released ahead of its release: the title track, "I Don't Want to Go to Mars", "Am I Really Going to Die", and "Blue Drift". Bonus Edition tracks "Trouble In America" and "Breakdown Days" were also later released as singles.

== Track listing ==
All tracks are written by White Lies.

As I Try Not to Fall Apart track listing
No.	Title	Length
1.	"Am I Really Going to Die"	4:47
2.	"As I Try Not to Fall Apart"	4:58
3.	"Breathe"	4:46
4.	"I Don't Want to Go to Mars"	4:37
5.	"Step Outside"	4:05
6.	"Roll December"	6:44
7.	"Ragworm"	4:32
8.	"Blue Drift"	5:00
9.	"The End"	3:54
10.	"There Is No Cure for It"	4:05
Total length:		47:28

Bonus Edition additional tracks
No.	Title	Length
11.	"Trouble In America"	3:36
12.	"Breakdown Days"	3:38
13.	"What If We're Bad Together"	4:23
14.	"Staring At the Sun"	4:55
Total length:		62:08

== Personnel ==
=== White Lies ===
- Harry McVeigh – lead vocal, guitar, keyboards
- Charles Cave – bass guitar, keyboards
- Jack Lawrence-Brown – drums, percussion

=== Production ===
- Claudius Mittendorfer – producer (tracks 1, 2, 5–7 and 10) and mixing
- Ed Buller – producer (tracks 3, 4, 8 and 9)
- John Davis – mastering
- Richie Kennedy – engineer (tracks 1, 2, 5–7 and 10)
- James Mellor – engineer (tracks 1, 2, 5–7 and 10)
- Darren Lawson – engineer (tracks 3, 4, 8 and 9)
- Claude Vause – studio assistant
- Ed Farrell – studio assistant
- Annelise Keestra – design

== Charts ==
Chart performance for As I Try Not to Fall Apart
Chart (2022)	Peak position
Austrian Albums (Ö3 Austria)	45
Belgian Albums (Ultratop Flanders)	16
Belgian Albums (Ultratop Wallonia)	69
Dutch Albums (Album Top 100)	9
German Albums (Offizielle Top 100)	36
Polish Albums (ZPAV)	43
Scottish Albums (Official Charts)	6
Swiss Albums (Schweizer Hitparade)	23
UK Albums (Official Charts)	14
UK Independent Albums (Official Charts)	3

== Release history ==
Release dates and formats for As I Try Not to Fall Apart
Region	Date	Label(s)	Format(s)	Catalogue No.
United Kingdom	18 February 2022	PIAS	CD	PIASR5100LP
United Kingdom	18 February 2022	PIAS	LP	PIASR5100LP
United Kingdom	18 February 2022	PIAS	LP (Clear vinyl)	PIASR5100LPX
United Kingdom	18 February 2022	PIAS	Cassette (Gold-coloured)	PIASR5100CA
United Kingdom	18 February 2022	PIAS	Digital download	—N/a
United Kingdom	21 October 2022	PIAS	Digital download (Bonus edition)	—N/a
