= There Goes Our Love Again =

Single by White Lies

from the album Big TV
- Released: 5 August 2013
- Recorded: ICP Studios, Brussels, Belgium
- Length: 3:36
- Label: Fiction
- Songwriter(s): Harry McVeigh, Charles Cave, Jack Lawrence-Brown

White Lies singles chronology
| "The Power & the Glory" (2011) | "There Goes Our Love Again" (2013) | "First Time Caller" (2013) |

"There Goes Our Love Again" is a song by English Indie rock band White Lies from their third studio album, Big TV. It was released on 5 August 2013 as the first official single to promote the album. The song received its first airplay on 18 June 2013, exclusively on Zane Lowe's BBC Radio 1 show, and was later made available to listen on White Lies' SoundCloud profile.

A number of 500 limited edition copies of the single – each individually numbered – was released on 10" vinyl.

The cover artwork for the single is a fragment of a painting entitled "Based On Actual Events: Scene 1" by New York City-based artist Michael Kagan.

== Music video ==
A music video for the single was released onto YouTube on 30 June 2013. It shows a group of dancers in a ballroom, judges, waiters, and White Lies as the band playing on stage in the back of the room. All the dancers, judges and waiters wear black Zorro-style eye masks. Viewer's attention is drawn to one of the dancers, a girl in a golden dress, who dances with multiple partners, but at the end is sitting sadly alone on the dancefloor. The video, which was directed by James Slater, stars Makoto Iso as the main dancer, and was shot in Rivoli Ballroom in Brockley, London. According to Slater, the video "is a homage to 1960s Bollywood thriller Gumnaam".

== Remixes ==
The Hostage Remix of the song was made available to listen on White Lies' SoundCloud profile on 26 June 2013, and the TORN Remix on 27 June 2013. Both remixes were featured on the vinyl version of the single, and on There Goes Our Love Again Remixes EP.

== Track listing ==
=== Limited edition 10-inch vinyl ===
Side A
| No. | Title | Length |
|---|---|---|
| 1. | "There Goes Our Love Again" | 3:36 |
| 2. | "There Goes Our Love Again" (instrumental) |

Side B
| No. | Title | Length |
|---|---|---|
| 1. | "There Goes Our Love Again" (Torn Remix) | 4:58 |
| 2. | "There Goes Our Love Again" (Hostage Remix) | 4:41 |

== Charts ==
| Chart (2013) | Peak position |
|---|---|
| Belgium (Ultratip Bubbling Under Flanders) | 30 |

== There Goes Our Love Again Remixes EP ==
There Goes Our Love Again Remixes

EP by White Lies
- Released: 23 August 2013
- Label: Polydor

White Lies chronology
| Big TV (2013) | There Goes Our Love Again Remixes (2013) |

There Goes Our Love Again Remixes is a four-track EP released by White Lies on 23 August 2013. It contains remixes of the band's single "There Goes Our Love Again".

=== Track listing ===
| No. | Title | Length |
|---|---|---|
| 1. | "There Goes Our Love Again" (GOOSE Version) | 5:11 |
| 2. | "There Goes Our Love Again" (Hostage Remix) | 4:42 |
| 3. | "There Goes Our Love Again" (TORN Remix) | 4:58 |
| 4. | "There Goes Our Love Again" (Night Engine Remix) | 5:30 |
