= Bigger than Us (White Lies song) =

Single by White Lies

from the album Ritual
- Released: 3 January 2011
- Recorded: May–June 2010
- Genre: Post-punk revival; alternative rock
- Length: 4.43 (Album Version); 4.06 (Radio Edit)
- Label: Fiction
- Songwriters: Harry McVeigh; Charles Cave; Jack Lawrence-Brown
- Producer: Alan Moulder

White Lies singles chronology
"Death" (2009)	"Bigger than Us" (2011)	"Strangers" (2011)

Audio sample
- file; help

Music video
- "Bigger Than Us" on YouTube

"Bigger than Us" is a song by English Indie rock band White Lies from their second studio album, Ritual. It was released as the lead single on 3 January 2011 in the United Kingdom, where it debuted at number 42. A live version of the track was made available by the band for download.

The single received its first airplay on Zane Lowe's BBC Radio 1 show on 16 November 2010. On 18 November 2010 the video premiered on the NME's website.

The song is featured on the soundtrack of the 2010 video game Need for Speed: Hot Pursuit, its 2020 remaster of the same name, and F1 2011.

== Music video ==
The music video for "Bigger than Us" was shot by French directorial duo Jonas & François. On 18 November 2010 the video premièred on the NME's website. The video is a homage to Steven Spielberg's 1982 film E.T. the Extra-Terrestrial. The video recreates elements of E.T.'s apparent death whilst he is quarantined alongside Elliott. The character of E.T. is played by a large "Bigger than Us" candy bar which contains a young girl. Elliot is watched over by Gertie and Mary whilst what may be Greg and Steve wait outside. There are other intertextual references to the film featured in the video, the basketballs circling the band at 2:56, the bright red light within the bass drum at 3:08 and the images of the woods where the original film sees E.T. return home.

== Track listing ==
Digital download

1. "Bigger than Us" – 4:46

7-inch single – Fiction Records 2756828

1. "Bigger than Us" – 4:46
2. "Bigger than Us" (Datassette Remix) – 6:38

== Charts ==
Chart (2010–11)	Peak position
Austria (Ö3 Austria Top 40)	46
Belgium (Ultratop 50 Flanders)	36
Belgium (Ultratip Bubbling Under Wallonia)	29
Denmark (Tracklisten)	38
Mexico Ingles Airplay (Billboard)	25
Netherlands (Single Top 100)	45
Polish Radio Airplay (LP3)	48
Scottish Singles Chart (OCC)	42
Swiss Airplay Chart (Hitparade)	96
UK Singles (Official Charts)	42
UK Singles Downloads Chart (OCC)	45
UK Physical Singles Chart (OCC)	7

== Release history ==
Region	Date	Label	Format
Belgium	19 November 2010	Polydor Records	Digital download
Denmark	19 November 2010	Polydor Records	Digital download
Germany	30 December 2010	Polydor Records	Digital download
United States	22 November 2010	Geffen Records	Digital download
United Kingdom	2 January 2011	Polydor Records	Digital download
