= Time to Give =

Single by White Lies

from the album Five
- Released: 17 September 2018
- Genre: Indie rock; new wave
- Length: 7:35
- Label: Fiction
- Songwriter(s): Harry McVeigh; Charles Cave
- Producer(s): Ed Buller; Flood

White Lies singles chronology
"Don't Want to Feel It All" (2017)	"Time to Give" (2018)	"Believe It" (2018)

"Time to Give" (stylized as ⠞⠊⠍⠑ ⠞⠕ ⠛⠊⠧⠑ in Braille) is the lead single off of White Lies' fifth studio album, Five. The single was released on 17 September 2018 through PIAS Recordings.

== Background ==
The album was first announced by the band on 17 September 2018 with the corresponding release of their first single, "Time to Give", which clocked in at 7 minutes, the longest single by the band to date. That same day the release date of 1 February 2019 was announced, as well as the Spring 2019 European tour. On the new album, White Lies described the album as a milestone in their career, as they have been active for a decade. "It marks our decade as a band, which has pushed us to expand our sound and reach new territory artistically — it marks the start of a new and exciting chapter for us."

In describing the song McVeigh felt the track and album had more eclectic and guitar-dominated influences to allow for a more varied record. "We thought it would be something that would work, to have these songs pull you off in a number of different tangents, and taking you to different places. And the production leans towards more guitars on the album. It’s a bit heavier, like how we explored on our first two albums. And we tried to do a few stranger things, with songs like ‘Time To Give’, which was the first song we released."

== Track listing ==
No.	Title	Length
1.	"Time to Give"	7:35
