= Ritual (White Lies album) =

Studio album by White Lies
- Released: 17 January 2011
- Studios: Assault & Battery 2, London, England
- Genres: Indie rock; post-punk revival; gothic rock
- Length: 49:39
- Label: Fiction
- Producers: Alan Moulder, Max Dingel

White Lies chronology
To Lose My Life... (2009)	Ritual (2011)	Big TV (2013)

Singles from Ritual
- 1. "Bigger than Us" Released: 3 January 2011; 2. "Strangers" Released: 21 March 2011; 3. "Holy Ghost" Released: 10 June 2011; 4. "The Power & the Glory" Released: 25 September 2011

Ritual is the second studio album by the British Indie rock band White Lies. It was released on 17 January 2011 by Fiction Records. The album was produced by Alan Moulder and Max Dingel, at the Assault & Battery Studios in London. The art direction and design were done by Tom Hingston Studio, featuring the Hartridge twins, Alice and Jessica, on the cover. The album's lead single, "Bigger than Us", was released on 3 January 2011.

A Ritual short film was released, containing three songs from the album: "Bad Love", "Holy Ghost" and "Bigger than Us".

As of January 2012, UK sales stand at 95,000 copies according to The Guardian.

== Critical reception ==
Professional ratings
Aggregate scores
Source	Rating
Album of the Year	54/100
Metacritic	60/100
Review scores
Source	Rating
AllMusic	3.5/5 stars
BBC Music	(positive)
Drowned In Sound	5/10 stars
NME	6/10 stars
Rolling Stone	2/5 stars
Spin	4/10 stars
Sputnikmusic	2.5/5 stars
The Telegraph	2/5 stars
Pitchfork	2.5/10
Paste	8.4/10

Ritual was met with mixed reviews from contemporary music critics. On review aggregator website, Metacritic, Ritual has an average score of 60 out of 100, indicating "mixed reviews" from 24 reviews. Album of the Year gave Ritual an aggregate score of 54 out of 100 based on 23 critic reviews, indicating "mixed reviews".

Jeff Leven, writing for Paste praised Ritual, in particular the instrumentation. Leven said of Ritual, "the sonic touches, song structure and performances are often immaculate, adventurous and loaded with intent. There are rarely guitars for the sake of guitars, and the washes of sound conjure ebony skies in a way that obscures the identity of the players themselves in service of the tableau". Leven ultimately gave Ritual an 8.4 out of 10, which was the highest amongst contemporary professional critics. Brian Boyd of The Irish Times also praised Ritual, giving it the "Album of the Week" distinction. Boyd described the album as "prog goth", and gave extra praise the vocals of Harry McVeigh saying that McVeigh's voice is "big and bold, with an industrial undertow." Boyd awarded the album a four out of five-star rating.

In a more mixed review, Chris Mandle of the New Musical Express said Ritual felt particularly derivative, comparing it to outtakes of Pornography by The Cure, or Turn on the Bright Lights by Interpol. Mandle also felt that the songs were much longer than necessary, saying that the tracks on Ritual are "a hole where the album’s heart should be. Ritual takes itself incredibly seriously, going so far as to stretch songs out to an average length of five minutes apiece lest their importance be lost. It’s an album that speaks at you rather than to you, and whose only real method of connection is a well-crafted chorus or 10." Mandle did note that there "is nothing gravely wrong" with Ritual and offered praise to the album's production and hooks, saying "the grandiose production style of Alan Moulder is also put to good use, and in addition to the album’s crisp, gleaming sound." Mandle gave Ritual a three out of five-star rating.

Gregory Heaney of AllMusic also had a mixed review of the album. Heaney did offer praise for Ritual having a more distinct sound, allowing for White Lies to "step out of the shadow of the likes of (contemporary bands) Interpol and Editors". Heaney complimented the breaks in the album's tense and ethereal content saying that the band's "ability to break up the gloom with the occasional soaring moment" is impressive. In The Guardian, Will Dean observed the influence of Sheffield electronica, Echo & the Bunnymen and OMD, calling the album "a decent set, but one whose pulse remains steady throughout".

Writing for Pitchfork, Ian Cohen panned the album summarising Ritual as "wildly overwrought and painfully dull". Cohen dismissed the album as poorly written, and with cringeworthy lyrics. Describing its sound, he compared the album to bands like Glasvegas, saying that "you've lived through Glasvegas and such, so you should know the drill by now: guitars whoosh and whir to sound exactly like synthesizers while the actual synthesizer goo provides the empty calories required for nearly every track on Ritual to reach its completely arbitrary five-minute length." Describing the instrumentation, Cohen said "The constant hi-hats and thrumming bass are meant to imply some sense of urgent momentum, and the inevitable half-time chorus lets McVeigh over-sing even more. Take all these ingredients, mix them together, and voila-- instant UK buzzband." Cohen ultimately gave Ritual a 2.5 out of 10.

Stacy Anderson of Rolling Stone also was critical of Ritual, particularly the albums vocals. Anderson said "when McVeigh beats you over the head with his bummed wail on "Bigger Than Us," you'll want to slip him some Wellbutrin." Anderson gave Ritual a two out of five-star rating.

== Track listing ==
All tracks are written by Harry McVeigh, Charles Cave and Jack Lawrence-Brown.

No.	Title	Length
1.	"Is Love"	4:52
2.	"Strangers"	5:24
3.	"Bigger than Us"	4:43
4.	"Peace & Quiet"	5:54
5.	"Streetlights"	5:00
6.	"Holy Ghost"	4:22
7.	"Turn the Bells"	5:04
8.	"The Power & the Glory"	5:13
9.	"Bad Love"	3:58
10.	"Come Down"	5:10
Total length:		49:40

Japanese edition bonus tracks
No.	Title	Length
11.	"Bigger Than Us" (Walls Hold Me Remix)	6:39
12.	"Is Love" (Stereolab Remix)	6:26
Total length:		62:45

Limited 6 x 7" edition bonus tracks
No.	Title	Length
11.	"Come Down" (Demo)	6:18
12.	"Strangers" (Demo)	5:36
Total length:		61:34

Limited 6 x 7" edition bonus remix CD
No.	Title	Length
1.	"Bigger Than Us" (Factory Floor Remix)	5:56
2.	"The Power & The Glory" (Bibio Remix)	5:21
3.	"Is Love" (Stereolab Remix)	6:26
4.	"Bigger Than Us" (Walls Hold Me Remix)	6:39
5.	"The Power & The Glory" (Wax Stag Remix)	6:27
Total length:		30:49

=== 2024 deluxe edition ===
On 14 June 2024, a 2-disc deluxe edition was released with bonus live tracks, as well as both demo tracks from the limited 6 x 7" box set edition and a remix.

2024 deluxe edition CD 2
No.	Title	Length
1.	"Come Down" (Demo)	6:18
2.	"Strangers" (Demo)	5:36
3.	"The Power & The Glory" (Live at Hoxton Bar and Kitchen, London)	5:38
4.	"Bigger Than Us" (Live at iTunes Festival, London)	4:48
5.	"Streetlights" (Live at iTunes Festival, London)	5:18
6.	"Strangers" (Live at iTunes Festival, London)	4:12
7.	"Peace & Quiet" (Live at Metropolis Studios, London)	5:36
8.	"Is Love" (Stereolab Remix)	6:26
Total length:		43:52

== Personnel ==
White Lies

- Harry McVeigh – lead vocals, guitar
- Charles Cave – bass guitar, backing vocals
- Jack Lawrence-Brown – drums

Additional personnel

- Alan Moulder – production
- Max Dingel – production

== Charts ==
=== Weekly charts ===
Chart performance for Ritual
Chart (2011)	Peak position
Austrian Albums (Ö3 Austria)	21
Belgian Albums (Ultratop Flanders)	4
Belgian Albums (Ultratop Wallonia)	27
Danish Albums (Hitlisten)	2
Dutch Albums (Album Top 100)	3
Finnish Albums (Suomen virallinen lista)	20
French Albums (SNEP)	123
German Albums (Offizielle Top 100)	10
Irish Albums (IRMA)	7
Italian Albums (FIMI)	64
Norwegian Albums (VG-lista)	19
Polish Albums (ZPAV)	14
Scottish Albums (Official Charts)	3
Spanish Albums (Promusicae)	94
Swedish Albums (Sverigetopplistan)	12
Swiss Albums (Schweizer Hitparade)	15
UK Albums (Official Charts)	3
UK Album Downloads (Official Charts)	2
US Billboard 200	95
US Top Alternative Albums (Billboard)	14
US Top Rock Albums (Billboard)	22

Chart performance for Ritual (2024 deluxe edition)
Chart (2024)	Peak position
Scottish Albums Chart (Official Charts)	45
UK Independent Albums (Official Charts)	15
UK Albums Sales (Official Charts)	39

=== Year-end charts ===
Chart (2011)	Position
Belgian Albums (Ultratop Flanders)	60
UK Albums (OCC)	165
