= To Lose My Life (song) =

Single by White Lies

from the album To Lose My Life...
- Released: 12 January 2009
- Recorded: May–September 2008; ICP Studios, Brussels; Kore Studios, Acton, West London
- Genre: Post-punk revival, indie rock
- Length: 3:13
- Label: Fiction
- Songwriters: Harry McVeigh, Charles Cave, Jack Lawrence-Brown
- Producers: Max Dingel, Ed Buller

White Lies singles chronology
"Death" (2008)	"To Lose My Life" (2009)	"Farewell to the Fairground" (2009)

Music video
- "To Lose My Life" on YouTube

"To Lose My Life" is a single by London indie rock band White Lies. It was released on 12 January 2009, one week before the release of the band's debut album, To Lose My Life.... "To Lose My Life" was featured in the soundtrack of the 2009 game, DiRT 2. In May 2010, the show 90210 played this song in the end scene. The song was also featured in a promo for the hit TV series, The Vampire Diaries, as well as being featured in Episode 7 of Season 1. The Hills played this song in the episode "Crazy In Love" of 5th season (4th episode).

== Recording history ==
The single was recorded during one of the band's album sessions which took place between May and September 2008. The video for the single was directed by Andreas Nilsson, who directed the video for the band's previous single "Death".

== Track listing ==
U.K. CD single – Fiction Records 1793327

1. "To Lose My Life" – 3:14
2. "To Lose My Life" (Filthy Dukes remix) – 5:42

U.K. 7-inch single (1) – Fiction Records 179 333-0

1. "To Lose My Life" – 3:14
2. "Farewell to the Fairground" (Yuksek remix) – 4:21

U.K. 7-inch single (2) (Clear vinyl) – Fiction Records 179 332-9

1. "To Lose My Life" – 3:14
2. "Taxidermy" – 3:16

U.K. Digital single

1. "To Lose My Life" (Filthy Dukes remix) – 5:44

U.K. iTunes Exclusive digital single

1. "To Lose My Life" (Tommy Sparks remix) – 6:11

U.K. Digital maxi-single

1. "To Lose My Life" – 3:14
2. "To Lose My Life" (Filthy Dukes remix) – 5:44
3. "To Lose My Life" (Tommy Sparks remix) – 6:11

== Charts ==
Chart (2009)	Peak position
Belgium (Ultrip Bubbling Under Flanders)	18
Czech Airplay (IFPI)	65
Denmark Airplay (Tracklisten)	7
Israeli Singles Chart	8
Mexico Ingles Airplay (Billboard)	28
Polish Radio Airplay (LP3)	43
Scottish Singles Chart (OCC)	4
Swiss Airplay Chart (Hitparade)	70
UK Singles Chart (OCC)	34
UK Singles Downloads Chart (OCC)	36
UK Physical Singles Chart (OCC)	5
