= Farewell to the Fairground =

Single by White Lies

from the album To Lose My Life...
- B-side: "Love Lockdown" (various remixes)
- Released: 23 March 2009
- Recorded: May–September 2008
- Studio: ICP Studios, Brussels, Belgium
- Genre: Indie rock, post-punk revival
- Length: 3:55
- Label: Fiction
- Songwriters: Harry McVeigh, Charles Cave, Jack Lawrence-Brown
- Producers: Ed Buller, Max Dingel

White Lies singles chronology
"To Lose My Life" (2009)	"Farewell to the Fairground" (2009)	"Death" (2009)

"Farewell to the Fairground" is a song by London-based indie rock band White Lies. It was released on 23 March 2009 by Fiction Records. It was their third single from debut album To Lose My Life..., and fourth single overall. The band recorded a video for the track with director Andreas Nilsson, filmed in Nikel, Russia.

The song reached number one in Poland and also charted in the Netherlands and the United Kingdom.

== History and release ==
"Farewell to the Fairground" was recorded along with nine other tracks in Brussels' ICP Studios between May and September 2008. In a track-by-track review of their debut album for NME, the band stated that it was one of a number of songs which were written particularly quickly during the recording process, as they had only recorded demo versions of five tracks prior to signing to Fiction and entering the studio. The band described it as one of their more upbeat tracks. A remix of the song, titled "Farewell to the Fairground (Yuksek Remix)", previously appeared as a B-side to previous single "To Lose My Life". The single featured the band's cover version of Kanye West's "Love Lockdown" as a B-side. The single charted at No. 84 in the week of its release. It then rose to No. 33 the week after, becoming the band's highest charting single.

== Track listing ==
U.K. CD single – Fiction Records 2700376

1. "Farewell to the Fairground" (Single Mix) – 4:01
2. "Farewell to the Fairground" (Future Funk Squad's 'Black Truth' Remix) – 5:55

U.K. 7-inch single (1) – Fiction Records 2700378

1. "Farewell to the Fairground" (Single Mix) – 4:01
2. "Farewell to the Fairground" (Rory Phillips White Horse Mix) – 4:56

U.K. 7-inch single (2) (Red vinyl) – Fiction Records 2700379

1. "Farewell to the Fairground" (Single Mix) – 4:01
2. "Love Lockdown" (Radio 1 Live Lounge Version) – 3:51

U.K. iTunes EP

1. "Farewell to the Fairground" (Single Mix) – 4:01
2. "Love Lockdown" (Radio 1 Live Lounge Version) – 3:51
3. "Farewell to the Fairground" (Rory Phillips White Horse Mix) – 4:56
4. "Farewell to the Fairground" (Disco Bloodbath Remix) – 5:27

== Charts ==
Chart (2009)	Peak Position
Belgium (Ultrip Bubbling Under Flanders)	6
Netherlands (Dutch Single Top 100)	83
Polish Radio Airplay (LP3)	1
Scottish Singles Chart (OCC)	9
UK Singles Chart (OCC)	33
UK Singles Downloads Chart (OCC)	35
UK Physical Singles Chart (OCC)	9

== Certifications ==
Region	Certification	Certified units/sales
United Kingdom (BPI)	Silver	200,000^{‡}
^{‡} Sales+streaming figures based on certification alone.

== In other media ==
The song was featured in the 2012 video game Forza Horizon, playing on the Horizon Rocks station.
