= Unfinished Business (song) =

Single by White Lies

from the album To Lose My Life...
- Released: 28 April 2008
- Genre: Post-punk revival; indie rock
- Label: Chess Club
- Songwriters: Harry McVeigh; Charles Cave; Jack Lawrence-Brown

White Lies singles chronology
"Unfinished Business" (2008)	"Death" (2008)

"Unfinished Business" is a single by UK band White Lies, released by Chess Club on 28 April 2008 on 7" vinyl. It was limited to 500 copies. A re-recorded version of the song appeared on their debut album, To Lose My Life.... The most obvious difference is that the album version does not feature the high-pitched backing vocals by bassist Charles Cave during the final chorus.

The single's B-side, "You Still Love Him", shares its chorus melody and lyrics with the song "One Night Friend". "One Night Friend" had previously been recorded by the band under their previous incarnation, Fear of Flying. During their 2009 European tour, White Lies began playing "You Still Love Him" live for the first time.

"Unfinished Business" was written in under 15 minutes, and directly led to the band's later name change. Lyrically, the song concerns a man trying to reconnect with his estranged girlfriend, only to realise that she has already killed him, and he is in fact now a ghost. He nevertheless still tries to "dance like we used to" before the "light in the distance" comes for him.

"Unfinished Business" was notably covered by Mumford and Sons on Australian radio station Triple J on their segment "Like a Version", and featured on the sixth album of the segment's cover versions.

== Music video ==
Directed by Simon Green and recorded in Sheffield on 9 April 2008, the music video for "Unfinished Business" features the band performing the song on a dark stage while a silhouette of a pair of scissors passes slowly over them. The scene is interjected with black-and-white footage, shot in reverse, of a young woman acting out a dream sequence.

== Track listings ==
U.K. 7-inch single – Chess Club CC003

1. "Unfinished Business" (Single version) – 4:13
2. "You Still Love Him" – 3:22

Japan CD extended play – Chess Club UICP-1094

1. "Unfinished Business" (Single version) – 4:13
2. "You Still Love Him" – 3:22
3. "From the Stars" (Live Zane Lowe session) – 4:56
4. "Unfinished Business" (Live Zane Lowe session) – 4:10
5. "Unfinished Business" (Enchanced video)

== Chart performance ==
Chart (2008)	Peak position
UK Independent Singles chart (OCC)	34
