= Big TV (album) =

Studio album by White Lies
- Released: 12 August 2013
- Studios: ICP Studios, Brussels, Belgium
- Genres: Indie rock, post-punk revival, new wave
- Length: 45:08
- Label: Fiction
- Producer: Ed Buller

White Lies chronology
Ritual (2011)	Big TV (2013)	Friends (2016)

Singles from Big TV
- 1. "There Goes Our Love Again" Released: 5 August 2013; 2. "First Time Caller" Released: 16 September 2013

Big TV (stylised as BIG TV) is the third studio album by the British indie rock band White Lies. It was released on 12 August 2013 by Fiction Records in the UK and Europe, and on 20 August 2013 in the US (Harvest Records) and Canada (Universal Music Canada).

The album was produced by Ed Buller at ICP Studios in Brussels, Belgium

On 18 August 2013, the album debuted at No. 4 on the UK Albums Chart.

In an interview with NME in January 2013, bassist Charles Cave said that the album was the band's most melodic record, but continued the definitive White Lies sound. The album follows a story of a couple who leave a provincial area for a big city and, according to Cave, the idea of equality in a relationship is a recurring theme.

Big TV was the first White Lies album to feature 12 rather than 10 tracks, two of which ("Space I" and "Space II") are instrumental interludes.

== Formats and packaging ==
The album was released as both as a regular CD and a deluxe 2CD hardback book edition, featuring seven original demos of songs from the album and stills from the studio sessions. The Japanese version included the seven demos from the hardback book edition as well as a remix of "There Goes Our Love Again", all on one disc. Big TV was also released digitally and on 180gsm vinyl.

The cover artwork for the album is a painting, "Pilot 2", by New York City-based artist Michael Kagan.

== Promotion ==
The track "Getting Even" was released on 4 June 2013 as a free download on White Lies' SoundCloud page. The song charted on Polish radio station Eska Rock, peaking at No. 1.

"There Goes Our Love Again", the first official single from the album, was released on 5 August 2013. The song was played on the air for the first time on 18 June 2013, exclusively on Zane Lowe's BBC Radio 1 show.

In July 2013, White Lies played three intimate shows at Hoxton Square Bar & Kitchen in London, celebrating the five-year anniversary of the band's first ever gig at the same venue. They played tracks from Big TV and some of their earlier songs in front of 300 fans each night. In August 2013, they made their Main Stage debut at Reading and Leeds Festivals. During their summer/fall 2013 tour, the band played more than 30 concerts in Europe and North America.

On 29 July 2013, the band made the song "Change" available to stream on their official SoundCloud page.

On 16 September 2013, White Lies announced that the next single from the album would be "First Time Caller", and they released an official music video for the song.

== Critical reception ==
Professional ratings
Aggregate scores
Source	Rating
Metacritic	64/100
Review scores
Source	Rating
AllMusic	4/5 stars
Clash	7/10
The Guardian	3/5 stars
The Independent	4/5 stars
The Line of Best Fit	8/10 stars
NME	6/10
The Observer	3/5 stars
Stereoboard	3.5/5 stars
Slant Magazine	3/5 stars
This Is Fake DIY	7/10

Big TV received generally favourable reviews from music critics. At Metacritic, which assigns a normalized rating out of 100 to reviews from mainstream critics, the album received an average score of 64, based on 18 reviews.

Matt Collar of AllMusic wrote that White Lies "sound even more engaged and clear-eyed than on the ambitious, stylized Ritual," and they "combine the urgent passions of their debut with the conceptual ambitions of their sophomore effort and by doing so, make the best album of their career". Cai Trefor of Clash magazine rated the album 7 out of 10, and described it as leaning towards retro, but also sounding firmly in the present, "utilising electronic samples with classic valve-driven guitar chords to accompany the trademark baritone of McVeigh". The Line of Best Fit's reviewer Ryan Thomas noted the album's 1980s atmosphere but said that "with influences visible, nods clearly marked, White Lies aren't just repackaging yesterday's hits as their own. Instead they're making use of abandoned utensils to create anew, achieving catharsis through resourcefulness. Yes, they are working with a previously-explored aesthetic, but they are molding it into a beautifully-original product, per a vision that refuses to forget music's former greatness".

== Track listing ==
No.	Title	Length
1.	"Big TV"	5:27
2.	"There Goes Our Love Again"	3:36
3.	"Space i"	0:48
4.	"First Time Caller"	3:34
5.	"Mother Tongue"	3:23
6.	"Getting Even"	4:56
7.	"Change"	4:51
8.	"Be Your Man"	4:23
9.	"Space ii"	1:10
10.	"Tricky to Love"	4:17
11.	"Heaven Wait"	4:42
12.	"Goldmine"	3:56
Total length:		45:07

Deluxe edition bonus disc
No.	Title	Length
1.	"Big TV" (demo)	5:38
2.	"There Goes Our Love Again" (demo)	3:16
3.	"First Time Caller" (demo)	3:34
4.	"Mother Tongue" (demo)	3:51
5.	"Getting Even" (demo)	4:46
6.	"Be Your Man" (demo)	5:05
7.	"Tricky to Love" (demo)	3:54
Total length:		30:07

Japanese edition bonus tracks
No.	Title	Length
13.	"Big TV" (demo)	5:38
14.	"There Goes Our Love Again" (demo)	3:16
15.	"First Time Caller" (demo)	3:34
16.	"Mother Tongue" (demo)	3:51
17.	"Getting Even" (demo)	4:46
18.	"Be Your Man" (demo)	5:05
19.	"Tricky to Love" (demo)	3:54
20.	"There Goes Our Love Again" (Torn Remix)	4:59
Total length:		80:13

=== 2024 deluxe edition ===
On 14 June 2024, a 2-disc deluxe edition was released with bonus live performances, demos and tracks from the Small TV EP.

2024 deluxe edition CD 2
No.	Title	Length
1.	"Big TV" (Demo)	5:38
2.	"There Goes Our Love Again" (Small TV version)	3:44
3.	"First Time Caller" (Small TV version)	4:01
4.	"Mother Tongue" (Demo)	3:51
5.	"Tricky to Love" (Demo)	3:54
6.	"First Time Caller" (Acoustic version)	3:50
7.	"Getting Even" (Live at Hoxton Bar & Kitchen, London)	5:11
8.	"Be Your Man" (Live at Hoxton Bar & Kitchen, London)	4:03
9.	"Big TV" (Live at Hoxton Bar & Kitchen, London)	5:36
10.	"There Goes Our Love Again" (Torn Remix)	4:59
Total length:		44:47

== Personnel ==
White Lies

- Harry McVeigh – lead vocals, guitar
- Charles Cave – bass guitar, backing vocals, lyrics
- Jack Lawrence-Brown – drums

Production

- Ed Buller – production
- Mark 'Spike' Stent – mixing

== Accolades ==
Publication	Country	Work	Accolade	Year	Rank
Pitchfork	US	cover art	The Top 25 Album Covers of 2013	2013	—

== Charts ==
=== Weekly charts ===
Chart performance for Big TV
Charts (2013)	Peak position
Australia (ARIA Hitseekers)	3
Austrian Albums (Ö3 Austria)	23
Belgian Albums (Ultratop Flanders)	14
Belgian Albums (Ultratop Wallonia)	38
Danish Albums (Hitlisten)	10
Dutch Albums (Album Top 100)	12
French Albums (SNEP)	129
German Albums (Offizielle Top 100)	19
Irish Albums (IRMA)	41
Italian Albums (FIMI)	64
Polish Albums (ZPAV)	26
Scottish Albums (Official Charts)	11
Swedish Albums (Sverigetopplistan)	55
Swiss Albums (Schweizer Hitparade)	3
UK Albums (Official Charts)	4
UK Album Downloads (Official Charts)	9

Chart performance for Big TV (2024 deluxe edition)
Charts (2024)	Peak position
Scottish Albums Chart (Official Charts)	31
UK Independent Albums (Official Charts)	9
UK Albums Sales (Official Charts)	31

=== Year-end charts ===
Charts (2013)	Position
Belgian Albums (Ultratop Flanders)	188

== Release history ==
Region	Date	Format	Label
United Kingdom, Europe	12 August 2013	CD, LP, digital download	Fiction Records
United States	20 August 2013	CD, LP, digital download	Harvest Records
Canada	20 August 2013	CD, LP, digital download	Universal Music Canada
