= To Lose My Life... =

Studio album by White Lies
- Released: 19 January 2009
- Recorded: May–September 2008
- Studios: ICP Studios, Brussels; Kore Studios, Acton, London
- Genres: Indie rock; post-punk revival
- Length: 44:50
- Label: Fiction
- Producers: Ed Buller; Max Dingel

White Lies chronology
To Lose My Life... (2009)	Ritual (2011)

Singles from To Lose My Life...
- 1. "Unfinished Business" Released: 28 April 2008; 2. "Death" Released: 22 September 2008; 3. "To Lose My Life" Released: 12 January 2009; 4. "Farewell to the Fairground" Released: 23 March 2009; 5. "Death (re-issue)" Released: 29 June 2009

To Lose My Life... (also known by extended title of To Lose My Life or Lose My Love, or shortened as To Lose My Life) is the debut album by the British indie rock band White Lies. It was released on 19 January 2009 by Fiction Records. The album was produced by Ed Buller and Max Dingel, and was recorded at ICP Studios in Belgium and Kore Studios in London.

The album produced four singles: "Unfinished Business", "Death" and "To Lose My Life", prior to its release, and "Farewell to the Fairground" in the months following. "Death" was reissued in June 2009, with "From the Stars" appearing as iTunes's "Single of the Week" during December 2008. The album was released in the United States on 17 March 2009.

== History and production ==
The album was recorded at ICP Studios in Brussels, Belgium, and Kore Studios, Acton, west London. It was produced by Ed Buller and Max Dingel, who previously worked with Suede, the Killers and Glasvegas. Further mixing was completed by Alan Moulder. The album featured a 20-piece orchestra, later stated as a 25-piece, arranged by Buller. Upon entering the studio, the band only had five early demo versions of tracks "Death", "E.S.T.", "Farewell to the Fairground", "From the Stars" and "Unfinished Business"; the rest of the songs were written and recorded during studio time.

== Promotion and release ==
On 22 September 2008, the band played nine of the 10 released tracks at Manchester's Night and Day Café. Reviewing the gig, NME described the album by its provisional title of To Lose My Life or Lose My Love.

The album was released on 19 January 2009 in the United Kingdom on CD and 12-inch vinyl, as well as in a number of other limited-edition forms, including one housed in a green cardboard box. Pre-orders bought from online retailer Play.com were packaged in a slipcase exclusive to that website, while the iTunes Store released the album with a number of bonus tracks and remixes previously only found as B-sides. White Lies' official website packaged the first 500 purchases with a green companion booklet, containing studio pictures and individual essays written by members of the band and production team. The site also published the album in a deluxe boxset, which contained the album on six 7-inch vinyl discs, along with an extra 7" containing demo versions of "The Price of Love" and "Nothing to Give". On 13 February 2009, the band announced the release of an instrumental version of the album, free with iTunes and physical purchases. The album's artwork was nominated alongside 49 others for Best Art Vinyl 2009 by website Artvinyl.com. Finishing seventh in the overall poll, the artwork was displayed in multiple exhibitions in Birmingham and London during November 2009.

On 17 April 2010, the band released The Remixes, an EP containing remixes of songs from To Lose My Life.... The five-track EP was limited to 500 copies and released as part of Record Store Day 2009.

== Reception ==
Professional ratings
Aggregate scores
Source	Rating
Metacritic	58/100
Review scores
Source	Rating
AllMusic	4/5 stars
Clash	(positive)
Drowned in Sound	(7/10)
The Fly	4.5/5 stars
The Guardian	2/5 stars
The Independent	(favourable)
NME	(8/10)
Pitchfork	(4.0/10)
Spin	2.5/5 stars
The Sunday Times	4/5 stars
Yahoo! Music	8/10 stars

=== Critical ===
Initial critical response for To Lose My Life... was mixed. At Metacritic, which assigns a normalized rating out of 100 to reviews from mainstream critics, the album has received an average score of 58, based on 17 reviews.

=== Chart performance ===
To Lose My Life... debuted at No. 1 on the UK Albums Chart, making White Lies the first British act in 2009 to achieve a No. 1 album. It was the first 2009 album to debut at No. 1. Worldwide, the album charted in 11 countries, including six top 40 positions in Europe.

== Track listing ==
All music is composed by White Lies.

No.	Title	Length
1.	"Death"	5:01
2.	"To Lose My Life"	3:11
3.	"A Place to Hide"	5:01
4.	"Fifty on Our Foreheads"	4:21
5.	"Unfinished Business"	4:18
6.	"E.S.T."	5:01
7.	"From the Stars"	4:52
8.	"Farewell to the Fairground"	4:16
9.	"Nothing to Give"	4:11
10.	"The Price of Love"	4:38
Total length:		44:50

iTunes Store bonus tracks
No.	Title	Length
11.	"You Still Love Him" ("Unfinished Business" B-side)	3:22
12.	"Black Song" ("Death" B-side)	3:47
13.	"Taxidermy" ("To Lose My Life" B-side)	3:17
Total length:		55:16

Limited 6 x 7" edition bonus tracks
No.	Title	Length
11.	"Nothing to Give" (Demo version)	4:12
12.	"The Price of Love" (Demo version)	3:44
Total length:		52:46

Japanese edition bonus tracks
No.	Title	Length
11.	"Death" (Crystal Castles Remix)	4:47
12.	"Farewell to the Fairground" (Yuksek Remix)	4:21
13.	"To Lose My Life" (Filthy Dukes Remix)	5:42
Total length:		59:40

=== 10th Anniversary Edition ===
On 25 October 2019, a deluxe edition of the album was released to celebrate the tenth anniversary of the album's release. This edition included a bonus disc with b-sides, demos, live tracks and remixes.

2019 deluxe edition CD 2
No.	Title	Length
1.	"Taxidermy" (B-Side)	3:16
2.	"You Still Love Him" (Demo)	3:21
3.	"Black Song" (B-Side)	3:50
4.	"Farewell to the Fairground" (Unreleased Demo)	4:33
5.	"Unfinished Business" (Chess Club single version)	4:10
6.	"From the Stars" (Unreleased Demo)	4:43
7.	"To Lose My Life" (Live, La Maroquinerie, Paris)	3:11
8.	"E.S.T." (Live at iTunes Festival, London)	4:28
9.	"A Place To Hide" (Live at iTunes Festival, London)	5:01
10.	"Death" (Crystal Castles Remix)	4:59
11.	"Nothing To Give" (M83 Remix)	6:22
Total length:		47:54

== Personnel ==
White Lies

- Harry McVeigh – lead vocals, guitar
- Charles Cave – bass guitar, backing vocals
- Jack Lawrence-Brown – drums

Additional personnel

- Ed Buller – production
- Max Dingel – production

== Charts and certifications ==
=== Weekly charts ===
Chart performance for To Lose My Life...
Chart (2009)	Peak position
Austrian Albums (Ö3 Austria)	57
Belgian Albums (Ultratop Flanders)	24
Danish Albums (Hitlisten)	10
Dutch Albums (Album Top 100)	31
French Albums (SNEP)	119
German Albums (Offizielle Top 100)	50
Irish Albums (IRMA)	23
Italian Albums (FIMI)	37
New Zealand Albums (RMNZ)	40
Norwegian Albums (VG-lista)	22
Scottish Albums (Official Charts)	3
Swiss Albums (Schweizer Hitparade)	73
UK Albums (Official Charts)	1
US Billboard 200	146
US Heatseekers Albums (Billboard)	4

Chart performance for To Lose My Life... (10th Anniversary Edition)
Chart (2019)	Peak position
Scottish Albums Chart (Official Charts)	40
UK Albums Chart (Official Charts)	90
UK Album Sales Chart (Official Charts)	37

=== Year-end charts ===
Chart (2009)	Position
UK Albums (OCC)	89

== Certifications ==
Region	Certification	Certified units/sales
Denmark (IFPI Danmark)	Gold	15,000^{^}
Ireland (IRMA)	Gold	7,500^{^}
United Kingdom (BPI)	Gold	229,575
^{^} Shipments figures based on certification alone.
