= Death (White Lies song) =

Single by White Lies

from the album To Lose My Life...
- B-side: "Black Song"; various remixes
- Released: 22 September 2008
- Genre: Indie rock, post-punk revival, new wave
- Length: 5:01 (album version); 4:13 (radio edit)
- Label: Fiction
- Songwriters: Harry McVeigh, Charles Cave, Jack Lawrence-Brown
- Producers: Ed Buller, Max Dingel

White Lies singles chronology
"Unfinished Business" (2008)	"Death" (2008)	"To Lose My Life" (2009)
"Farewell to the Fairground" (2009)	"Death" (2009)	"Bigger than Us" (2011)

"Death" is the second single by English indie rock band White Lies, released by Fiction Records. "Death" was initially released on CD and 7-inch vinyl on 22 September 2008, prior to the release of their debut album, To Lose My Life... The track was then re-released on 22 June 2009 on multiple formats as the band's fifth and final single from the album. In the United States, the track was released as part of a four-track extended play titled Death, alongside all United Kingdom-released B-sides.

"Death" was the second track written by White Lies, after "Unfinished Business". The 2008 release of "Death" contained one B-side, "Black Song", while the 7" vinyl was accompanied by various remixes by Crystal Castles and Haunts. The single reached No. 52 on the UK Singles Chart. The 2009 re-release included further remixes by Chase & Status, Mistabishi, L'amour La Morgue and M83.

== Music video ==
The music video for the 2008 release was filmed in Sweden by director Andreas Nilsson. A second Nilsson-directed video was released in promotion of the single's 2009 reissue, for the Crystal Castles remix of the song.

== Use in media ==
"Death" was featured in the 2009 film Jennifer's Body and in the 2014 Ana Lily Amirpour indie vampire film A Girl Walks Home Alone at Night. The song was also used in the official trailer for season 3 of the hit Netflix series, Sex Education.

== Track listings ==
=== 2008 release ===
U.K. CD single – Fiction Records 1782724

1. "Death" – 5:01
2. "Death" (Crystal Castles Remix) – 4:46

U.K. 7-inch single (1) – Fiction Records 1784012

1. "Death" – 5:01
2. "Death" (Haunts Remix) – 5:53

U.K. 7-inch single (2) – Fiction Records 1782725

1. "Death" – 5:01
2. "Black Song" – 3:47

US CD EP – Geffen Records B0012203-32

1. "Death" – 5:01
2. "Black Song" – 3:47
3. "Death" (Crystal Castles Remix) – 4:46
4. "Death" (Haunts Remix) – 5:53

=== 2009 release ===
U.K. 7-inch single (1) (White vinyl) – Fiction Records 2708249

1. "Death" – 5:01
2. "Nothing to Give" (M83 Remix) – 6:24

U.K. 7-inch single (2) – Fiction Records 2709729

1. "Death" (Crystal Castles Remix) – 4:46
2. "Death" (Mistabishi Remix) – 4:48

U.K. iTunes EP

1. "Death" (Chase & Status Remix) – 4:55
2. "Death" (Mistabishi Remix) – 4:48
3. "Death" (L'amour la Morgue Edition) – 4:39
4. "Nothing to Give" (M83 Remix) – 6:24

U.K. Remixes EP

1. "Death" (Chase & Status Remix) – 4:55
2. "Death" (Crystal Castles Remix) – 4:46
3. "Death" (L'amour la Morgue Edition) – 4:39
4. "Death" (Mistabishi Remix) – 4:48
5. "Death" (Hurts Remix) – 5:49

== Chart performance ==
Chart performance for "Death" (original release)
Chart (2008–2009)	Peak position
Belgium (Ultrip Bubbling Under Flanders)	3
Mexico Ingles Airplay (Billboard)	30
Polish Radio Airplay (LP3)	35
Scottish Singles Chart (OCC)	8
UK Singles Chart (OCC)	52
UK Singles Downloads Chart (OCC)	95
UK Physical Singles Chart (OCC)	8
US Dance Singles Sales (Billboard)	4

Chart performance for "Death" (re-release)
Chart (2009)	Peak position
Scottish Singles Chart (OCC)	20
UK Physical Singles Chart (OCC)	16
