= Friends (White Lies album) =

Studio album by White Lies
- Released: 7 October 2016
- Studios: Studio One, London; The Distillery, Bath
- Genres: Synth rock, post-punk revival
- Length: 44:01
- Label: BMG
- Producers: White Lies, Richard Wilkinson

White Lies chronology
| Big TV (2013) | Friends (2016) | Five (2019) |

Singles from Friends
- 1. "Take It Out on Me" Released: 29 June 2016; 2. "Come On" Released: 7 September 2016; 3. "Hold Back Your Love" Released: 29 September 2016; 4. "Morning in LA" Released: 29 September 2016; 5. "Don't Want to Feel It All" Released: 19 January 2017

Friends is the fourth studio album by English indie rock band White Lies, released in 2016.

== Background ==
Friends was released by BMG on 7 October 2016 on digital download, vinyl LP and CD. A special box set was also issued via the band's website and official store containing two coloured cassettes, the first containing the album and the second with four bonus tracks on side C and four demos on side D. The box set also contained a download code on a "credit card" and a cheque-book style booklet with photos, lyrics and maze games.

The first four bonus tracks from the cassette box set edition were also released on CD in Japan and later released digitally in February 2017.

== Reception ==
Professional ratings
Aggregate scores
| Source | Rating |
|---|---|
| AnyDecentMusic? | 5.5/10 |
| Metacritic | 67/100 |
Review scores
| Source | Rating |
| AllMusic | 3.5/5 stars |
| Clash | 7/10 |
| Drowned in Sound | 4/10 |
| MusicOMH | 3/5 stars |
| Slant Magazine | 2.5/5 stars |
| The Line of Best Fit | 4.5/10 |

Josh Williams of Dork wrote, "The better songs on the record come when the band fully embrace their 80s influences, with 'Hold Back Your Love' peppered with rolling synths whilst 'Swing' feels like early OMD... Ultimately, the album sounds like a band running out of steam. It lacks cohesion and feels like a compilation of songs rather than a record – indeed it also lacks the indie anthems the band are known for."

== Track listing ==
All tracks are written by White Lies.

| No. | Title | Length |
|---|---|---|
| 1. | "Take It Out on Me" | 3:50 |
| 2. | "Morning in LA" | 3:20 |
| 3. | "Hold Back Your Love" | 5:00 |
| 4. | "Don't Want to Feel It All" | 4:20 |
| 5. | "Is My Love Enough?" | 5:56 |
| 6. | "Summer Didn't Change a Thing" | 4:04 |
| 7. | "Swing" | 5:33 |
| 8. | "Come On" | 4:07 |
| 9. | "Right Place" | 4:19 |
| 10. | "Don't Fall" | 3:45 |
| Total length: | | 44:14 |

Japanese edition bonus tracks / Digital deluxe edition bonus tracks
| No. | Title | Length |
|---|---|---|
| 11. | "What I Need" | 3:31 |
| 12. | "Give a Sign" | 4:05 |
| 13. | "Friends" | 5:15 |
| 14. | "Where Do I Go?" | 3:16 |
| Total length: | | 60:21 |

Cassette box set edition bonus tracks
| No. | Title | Length |
|---|---|---|
| 11. | "Friends" | 5:15 |
| 12. | "Give a Sign" | 4:05 |
| 13. | "What I Need" | 3:31 |
| 14. | "Where Do I Go?" | 3:16 |
| 15. | "8913" ("Take It Out on Me" Demo) | 3:48 |
| 16. | "Morning in LA" (Demo) | 3:52 |
| 17. | "Summer Didn't Change a Thing" (Demo) | 4:27 |
| 18. | "Son of a Gun" (Demo) | 5:51 |
| Total length: | | 78:19 |

== Personnel ==
- Harry McVeigh – lead vocals, guitar
- Charles Cave – bass guitar, backing vocals
- Jack Lawrence-Brown – drums
- Richard Wilkinson, White Lies - producer
- Phil Parsons - engineer
- John Davis - mastering
- David Wrench, Marta Salogni - mixing
- Markus Bagå – art direction, design
- Big Active - creative director
- Steve Gullick - photography
- James Brown - recorded by

== Charts ==
| Chart (2016) | Peak position |
|---|---|
| Australia (ARIA Hitseekers) | 19 |
| Austrian Albums (Ö3 Austria) | 59 |
| Belgian Albums (Ultratop Flanders) | 11 |
| Belgian Albums (Ultratop Wallonia) | 39 |
| Dutch Albums (Album Top 100) | 32 |
| French Albums (SNEP) | 194 |
| German Albums (Offizielle Top 100) | 40 |
| New Zealand Heatseekers Albums (RMNZ) | 10 |
| Scottish Albums (Official Charts) | 15 |
| Swiss Albums (Schweizer Hitparade) | 50 |
| UK Albums (Official Charts) | 11 |
| UK Independent Albums Chart (Official Charts) | 4 |

== Release history ==
Release dates and formats for Friends
| Region | Date | Label(s) | Format(s) | Catalogue No. |
|---|---|---|---|---|
| United Kingdom & Europe | 7 October 2016 | Infectious Music; BMG; PIAS | CD | 538225502 |
| United Kingdom & Europe | 7 October 2016 | Infectious Music; BMG; PIAS | LP | 538225511 |
| United Kingdom | 7 October 2016 | Infectious Music; BMG; PIAS | LP (Picture disc) | 538230441 |
| United Kingdom | 7 October 2016 | Infectious Music; BMG; PIAS | 2×Cassette (Box set) | 583230202 |
| Japan | 7 October 2016 | Infectious Music; BMG; PIAS | CD | HSE-3678 |
| United Kingdom & Europe | 16 February 2017 | BMG | Digital download (Deluxe edition) | —N/a |
