= White Lies (band) =

English post-punk band

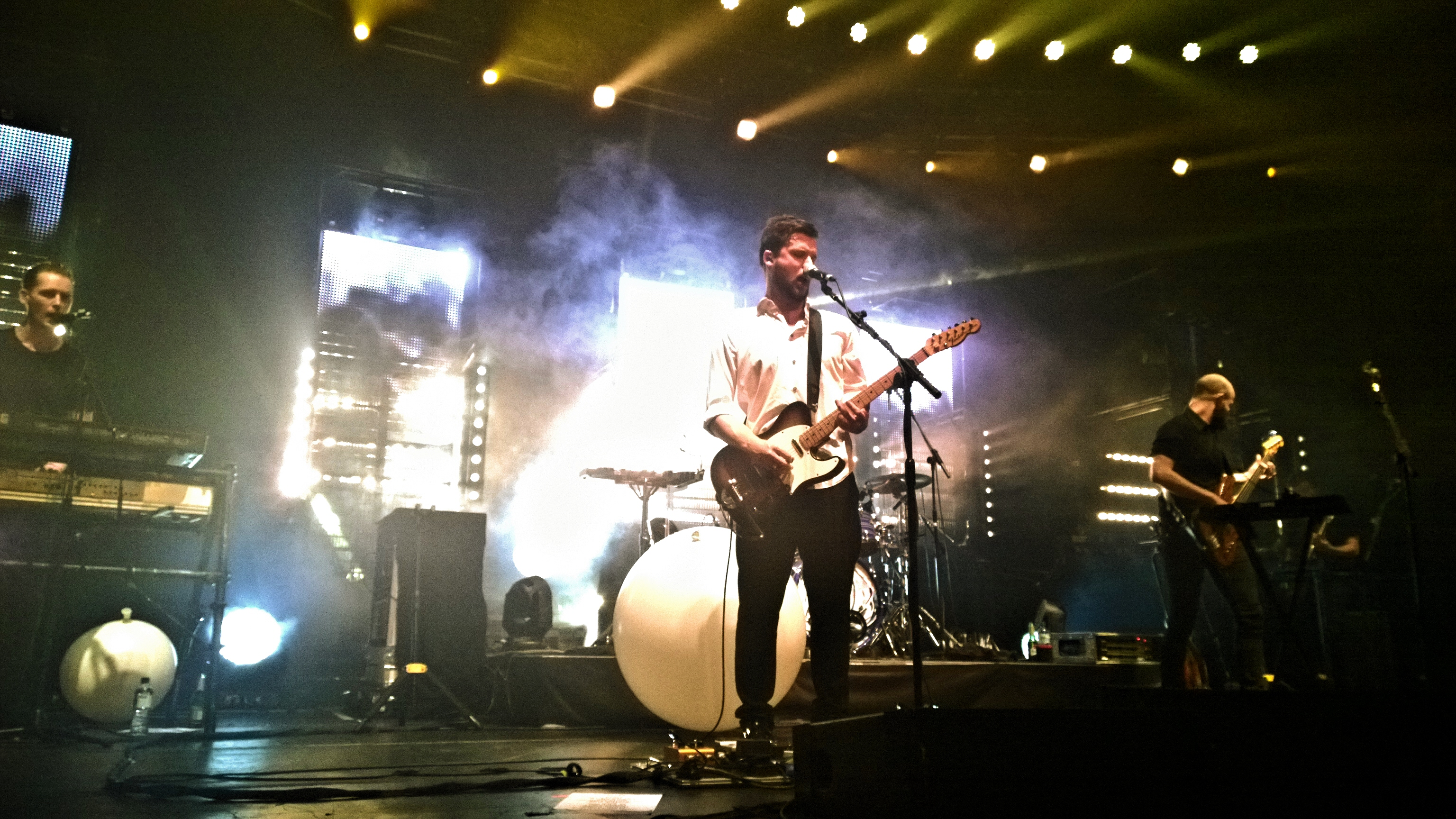
- White Lies in 2013

Background information
- Also known as: Fear of Flying
- Origin: Ealing, London, England
- Genres: Indie rock; alternative rock; post-punk revival; new wave
- Years active: 2007–present
- Labels: Fiction; Geffen; Harvest; BMG; PIAS
- Members: Harry McVeigh; Charles Cave; Jack Lawrence-Brown
- Website: whitelies.com

White Lies are an English indie rock band from Ealing, London. Formerly known as Fear of Flying, the core band members are Harry McVeigh (lead vocals, guitar), Charles Cave (bass guitar and backing vocals), and Jack Lawrence-Brown (drums). The band performs live as a four-piece, when they are joined by Tommy Bowen on keyboards.

White Lies formed in October 2007, after writing songs that they felt didn't suit their original band. After delaying their first performance for five months to build up media hype, they earned a recording contract with Fiction Records days after their debut. The release of singles "Unfinished Business" and "Death" led to tours and festival appearances in the United Kingdom and North America, including a headline performance at BBC Radio 1's Big Weekend and a place on the 2009 NME Awards Tour. At the beginning of 2009, White Lies featured in multiple "ones to watch" polls for the coming year, including the BBC's Sound of 2009 poll and the BRITs Critics' Choice Award.

White Lies' debut album To Lose My Life..., released in January 2009, was a number one hit on the UK Albums Chart. Their second album Ritual was recorded in 2010, and released on 17 January 2011. Big TV, their third studio album was released on 12 August 2013, whilst their fourth, titled Friends, was released 7 October 2016. Their fifth album, Five, was released on 1 February 2019, As I Try Not to Fall Apart, was released on 18 February 2022 and their latest, Night Light was released on 7 November 2025.

== History ==
=== Formation ===
Charles Cave and Jack Lawrence-Brown were both from Pitshanger Village in North Ealing, and first played together in a school show at North Ealing Primary School. Harry McVeigh (from Shepherd's Bush) joined them two years later, and they began playing under the name Fear of Flying at the age of fifteen. Cave described the band as a "weekend project", and one of many groups which they were involved in while at school. Fear of Flying completed one UK tour as a support act, as well as further slots with The Maccabees, Jamie T and Laura Marling. They released two double A-side vinyl singles on independent record label Young and Lost Club, "Routemaster/Round Three" on 7 August 2006 and "Three's a Crowd/Forget-Me-Nots" on 6 December 2006. Both vinyls were produced by former Blur and The Smiths collaborator, Stephen Street, whom they met through a friend at school. They went on to play the inaugural Underage Festival in Victoria Park, England on 10 August 2007.

Two weeks prior to the group starting university, they decided that they would take a second gap year, and perform new material which the band felt did not suit their current outfit. Cave stated that "I felt as though I couldn't write about anything personal, so I would make up semi-comical stories that weren't really important to anyone, not even me." Fear of Flying disbanded in October 2007 with a MySpace bulletin stating "Fear of Flying is DEAD ... White Lies is alive!", before introducing a darker sound and a new name that reflected their maturity. Cave stated that the band deleted their MySpace account "without any token farewell gigs". McVeigh said that the current musical climate had an effect on the split, stating that "Maybe a few years ago, we would have signed a deal and had a chance to make three albums [...]. In the current climate...we’d have been dropped". When asked about the name change in an interview with a radio station in San Francisco, Jack Brown said that "We just thought that we should perform these songs as a different band. We had songs that we felt weren't suitable for the band that we were in and we thought White Lies would be the perfect vehicle for the songs."

=== Early releases ===
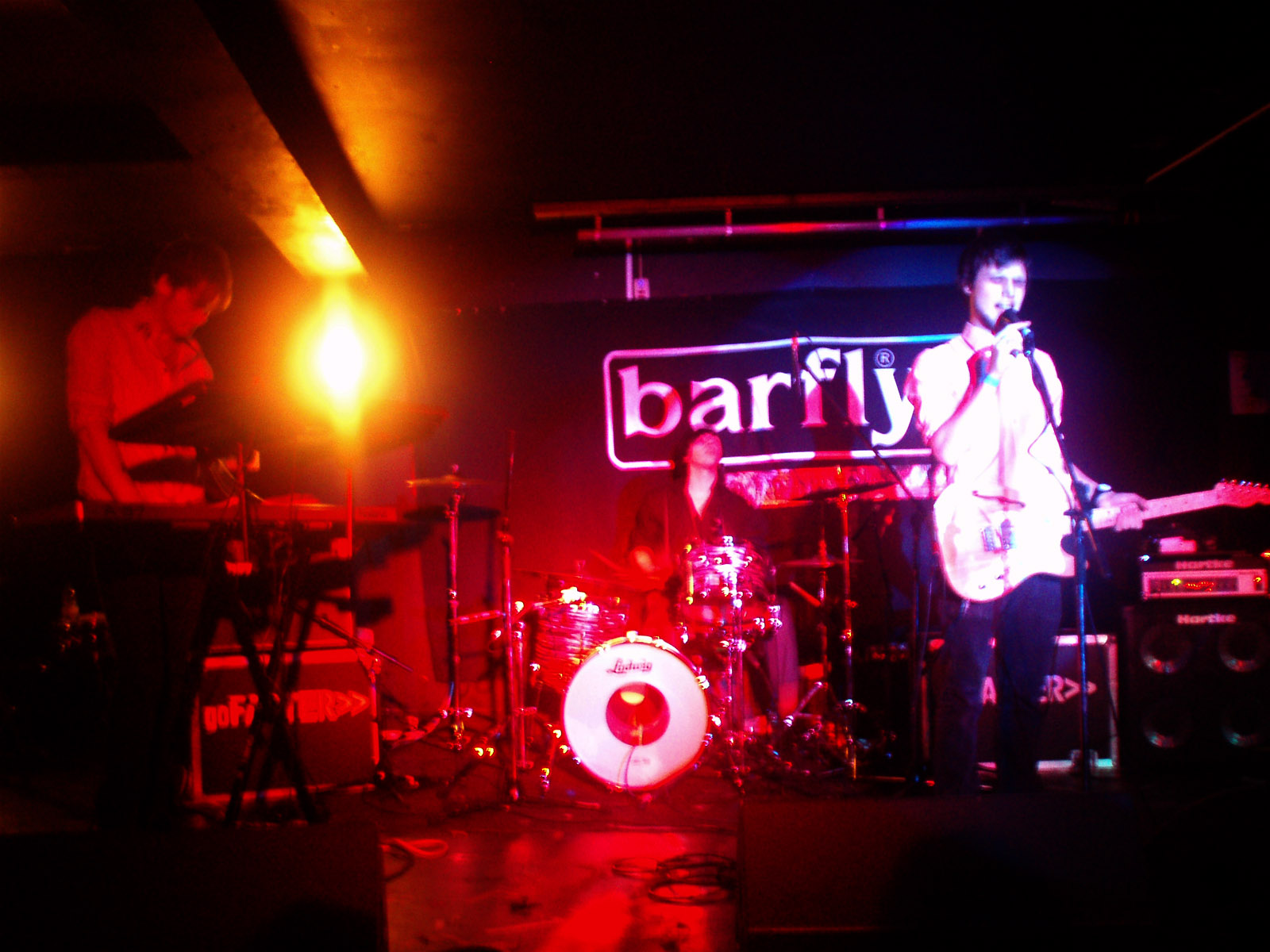
White Lies, February 2008

Playing under the new name, White Lies played their first gig at Hoxton Square's Bar & Kitchen on 28 February 2008, supporting Team Waterpolo and Semifinalists. The band admitted rehearsing for two months for the gig, as well as putting off their debut for five months to gather media hype. Following this, the band received numerous record label offers, eventually signing to Fiction Records a matter of days after their first performance. The band also signed publishing rights to Chrysalis Music Publishing. The band said they chose the name because "white lies are quite dark...that's how we see ourselves." Receiving airtime on BBC Radio 1, Zane Lowe named "Death" his "Hottest Record in the World" on 5 February 2008, despite the song having never been officially released. Radio 1 would go on to feature the band at Radio 1's Big Weekend in May 2008, where they headlined the BBC Introducing stage.

On 10 March 2008, White Lies were announced as one of four bands taking part in the first ever NME New Noise Tour (now the NME Radar Tour). The tour visited eleven cities in the UK throughout May 2008. The band were first featured in the magazine in the issue dated 22 March 2008, appearing in the "Everyone's Talking About..." section of their Radar article. Live Editor Hamish MacBain described tracks "Death" and "XX" (later titled "Unfinished Business") - the only two songs available on the band's MySpace - as "...not too afraid of a little sincerity, not afraid of a little scale". The band released their debut single one month later, a 7-inch vinyl of "Unfinished Business" on 28 April 2008. The limited pressing was released by Chess Club Records, an independent record label co-founded by drummer Jack Brown. To mark the release, the band supported dEUS in London's Scala on 16 April 2008, as well as a performance at the 2008 Camden Crawl.

=== To Lose My Life... (2009) ===
They made their television debut on Later... with Jools Holland on 30 May 2008, playing "Unfinished Business" and "Death". This marked their final public performance prior to recording their debut album, scheduling sessions in ICP Studios in Belgium and Kore Studios in West London. The album was provisionally titled To Lose My Life or Lose My Love, with a scheduled release date was set for January 2009. The title came from a line in the album's title track, "To Lose My Life". During the summer of 2008, the band played numerous UK and overseas music festivals, including major festivals Oxegen, T in the Park, and the Reading and Leeds Festivals. Beginning in September 2008, the band played their first headline tour, performing thirteen dates in the United Kingdom. The tour marked the release of "Death" on 22 September 2008, with a further six dates played in the United States in October 2008. The tour included an appearance at the CMJ Music Festival in New York on 23–24 October, alongside Jay Reatard, Amazing Baby and Violens. Following this, the band returned to support Glasvegas on their fifteen date UK tour in November and December 2008. NME.com exclusively announced their debut album would be released on 12 January 2009, with shortened title To Lose My Life.... The band preceded the album with the single release of "To Lose My Life" one week earlier. The full-length video for "To Lose My Life" premiered exclusively on the band's MySpace on 21 November 2008.

On 11 November 2008, NME announced that White Lies would be taking part in the 2009 ShockWaves NME Awards Tour, alongside Friendly Fires, Florence and the Machine and headliners Glasvegas. The annual tour, taking place in early 2009, visited seventeen cities in the UK. On 7 February 2009, it was announced in NME that the entire tour had sold out. On the Manchester tour date, the band dueted with Florence Welch to play "Unfinished Business". The band would later also be announced for Xfm's Winter Wonderland festival in London, as well as one of four bands playing NME's Big Gig on 26 February 2009.

At the beginning of 2009, the band were featured in numerous polls as "ones to watch" for the coming year. The BBC placed them second in their Sound of 2009 poll, as well as coming third in the 2009 BRITs Critics' Choice Award, behind Florence and the Machine and Little Boots. To mark the album release, "From the Stars" appeared as iTunes's "Single of the Week" on 30 December 2008, two weeks prior to the album's release. In addition, the band played a Live Lounge session for Jo Whiley's BBC Radio 1 show on 14 January 2009, playing "To Lose My Life" as well as a cover of Kanye West's "Love Lockdown". The cover was included as a b-side to "Farewell to the Fairground", released on 23 March 2009.

Upon the release of To Lose My Life, White Lies became the first British act in 2009 to achieve a number one album, and the first album to debut at number one. After charting high in the midweek sales, the album beat off competition from Lady Gaga, The Script and Kings of Leon. In support of the release, the band played on Channel 4's Shockwaves Album Chart Show, Last Call with Carson Daly and the Late Show with David Letterman, the latter being the band's first performance on US television. Following supporting Snow Patrol on their tour of both Ireland and the United Kingdom, the band embarked on their own headline world tour, playing sold out dates across Europe, North America, Japan and the United Kingdom. While in North America, the band co-headlined the NME Presents tour with Friendly Fires. The bands were supported by The Soft Pack, with White Lies headlining seven of the fifteen dates, including their first appearance at the South by Southwest festival. During the tour, the band were forced to play a shortened, six song set at New York's Bowery Ballroom, due to McVeigh having throat problems. During summer 2009, the band played a number of major UK and overseas music festivals, including Rock Werchter, Benicàssim, Coachella, Glastonbury, Isle of Wight, Lollapalooza, Oxegen, Radio 1's Big Weekend, Reading and Leeds, Roskilde and T in the Park. "Death" was re-released on 29 June 2009. To mark the release, live performances from a selection of the band's festival appearances were broadcast online through the band's web player, titled "The Summer of Death".

In September 2009, White Lies performed as a support act for Coldplay, including a date at Wembley Stadium, where the band performed in front of a half full stadium. The band played as the first support act and was greatly received.

=== Ritual (2011) ===
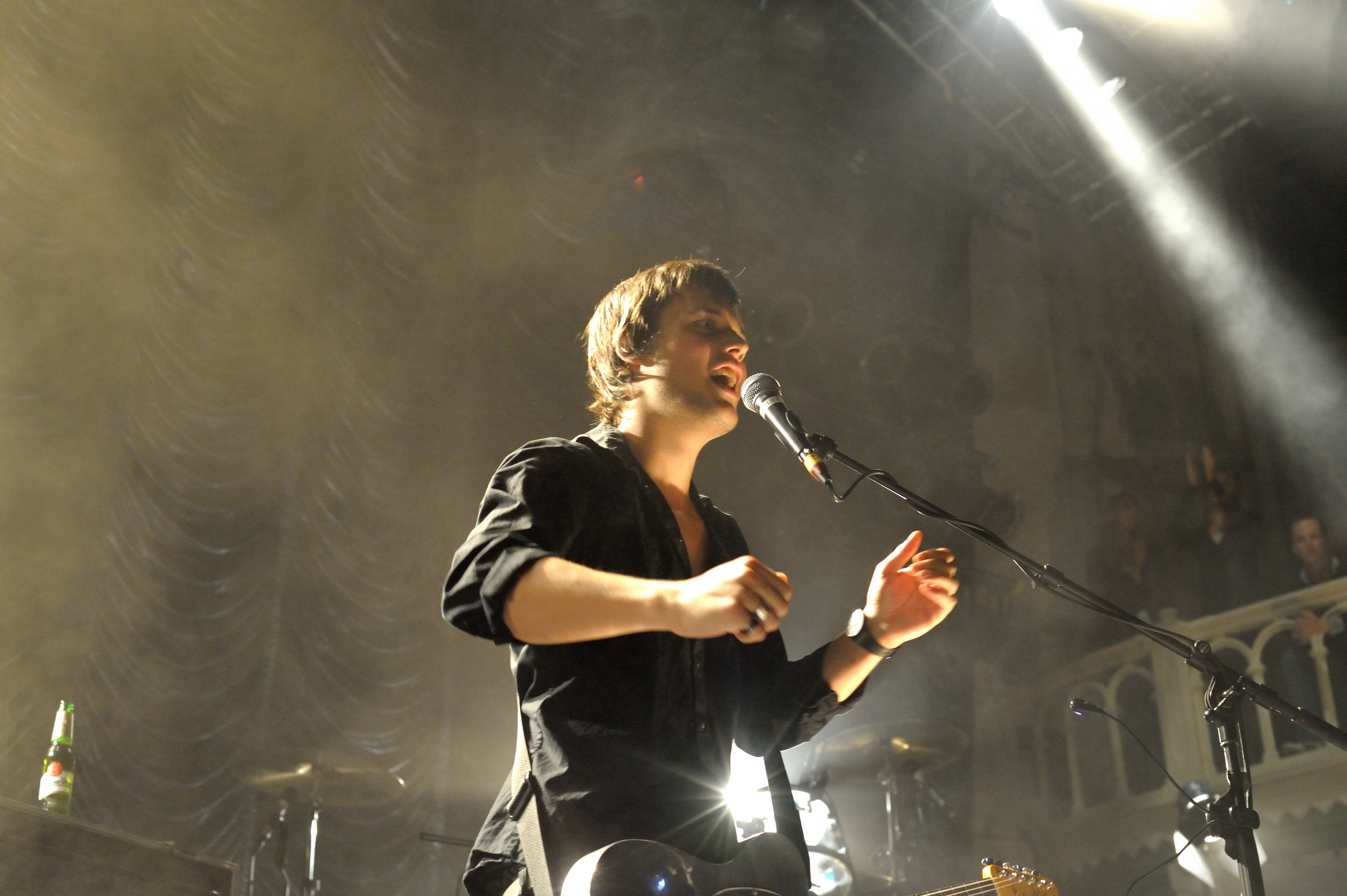
Harry McVeigh performing in 2009

In an interview with the BBC's Newsbeat programme, McVeigh stated that due to the nature of the band's songwriting techniques clashing with their difficult touring schedules, there will be no new White Lies material until 2010. Despite this, McVeigh has mentioned that the ambitious recording of "Nothing to Give" and "The Price of Love" (from To Lose My Life...) act as a taster of the different sound to come on their sophomore release. In September 2009, the band released "Taxidermy" as a digital download through iTunes for the first time. A live favourite amongst fans, the track had previously only been released on the (now deleted) vinyl release of "To Lose My Life". During the same month, the band supported Kings of Leon's tour of the United States, and Coldplay's tour of the United Kingdom. As well as this, the band played their own headline tour across Europe during October—November 2009, including some of their biggest shows to date in the UK. A number of the tour dates were later cancelled, due to McVeigh falling ill during their concert in Munich, Germany. Having fully recovered in time for the beginning of their UK dates, the tour continued as normal, with cancelled dates being rescheduled for February 2010.

On 13 February 2010, White Lies became the first high-profile artist to perform at the FAC251 music venue in Manchester. The band played there again on 14 February, with tickets for the second show made available exclusively through the band's website. The performances were the band's only scheduled headline performances of 2010. Both concerts sold out in a matter of minutes, with 38,000 people applying for the 400 tickets available. As well as this, they supported Muse across a number of European stadium shows between June and September 2010. In August 2010 the band played the 4Music stage at V Festival; also featuring the likes of Paloma Faith, The Temper Trap and David Guetta, the stage was lauded as a major success for the festival.

In November 2010, White Lies confirmed that their second album, Ritual, had been completed and would be released on 17 January 2011. Produced by Alan Moulder, the album's first single "Bigger than Us" was released on 3 January 2011. An eleven date tour of the United Kingdom was also announced for February 2011.

=== Big TV (2013) ===
In an interview with NME in January 2013, bassist Charles Cave revealed that the band's third album was intended to be released in late summer, with one of the tracks promoting the record being called "Getting Even". On 4 June 2013 it was revealed that the album, which was produced by Ed Buller and recorded earlier that year, would be titled Big TV. Also, the track list for the album was published and "Getting Even" was released as a free download. The first official single from the album, "There Goes Our Love Again", was released on 5 August 2013, with the album being released in the UK and Europe a week later, on 12 August 2013 through Fiction Records. It was released on 20 August 2013 in the US (through Harvest Records), and in Canada (Universal Music).

On 23/25 July 2013, White Lies played 3 intimate shows at Hoxton Square Bar & Kitchen in London, celebrating the 5 year anniversary of the band's first ever gig at the same venue. They played tracks from Big TV and some of their earlier songs in front of 300 fans each night. During their Summer/Fall 2013 tour, the band was scheduled to play more than thirty concerts in Europe and North America. In August 2013 they made their Main Stage debut at Reading and Leeds Festivals.

On 6 November 2013, the band released a limited edition EP to celebrate their tour, called Small TV. The five-track EP, released on Fiction Records, was limited to 1000 copies and featured covers of tracks by Lana Del Rey and Prince in addition to new versions of their own music.

=== Friends (2016) ===
The band released its fourth album, Friends, on 7 October 2016, after first being reported on in 2015. In December 2015 the band signed to Infectious Music.

=== Five (2019) ===
On 17 September 2018, the band announced that their new album Five would be released on 1 February 2019 by PIAS Recordings. "Time to Give", the first single from the album, was released on the same day.

=== As I Try Not to Fall Apart (2022) ===
On 27 September 2021, the band announced that their sixth album As I Try Not to Fall Apart would be released on 18 February 2022 by PIAS Recordings.

=== Night Light (2025) ===
On 16 July 2025, the band announced that their seventh studio album, Night Light, is scheduled for release on 7 November 2025 via PIAS Recordings. The announcement was accompanied by the release of the lead single "In the Middle".

== Musical style and influences ==
As Fear of Flying, Banquet Records described the band's second single as "Quite danceable indie". The Guardian's official website named them an indie-pop band, stating "they made promising, if unremarkable, Franz Ferdinand-styled pop with cheeky chappy lyrics". In an interview with BBC London, they cited Talking Heads as a major influence. White Lies' darker sound has been primarily compared to Joy Division, Interpol and Editors, as well as Arcade Fire, The Killers, Echo & the Bunnymen, Tears for Fears and The Teardrop Explodes. McVeigh's singing voice has been compared to that of Ian Curtis and Julian Cope. When asked about the comparisons in an interview with ITN Music, McVeigh stated that "We weren't alive during that period of music...we've never really been that into Joy Division, especially not the Editors...or even Interpol really", adding "I don't think our music sounds a whole lot like those comparisons, I think we're a lot more euphoric and uplifting". As White Lies, the band have reiterated the influence of Talking Heads, both musically and in songwriting. As well as this, the band have stated that The Secret Machines are one of their main influences. In a commentary on a "Track by Track" interview on Spotify, one band member said that the band was influenced by The Cars, specifically how their guitar riffs on "Be Your Man" from the "Big TV" album was influenced by The Cars song "Just What I Needed".

== Band members ==
- Harry McVeigh – lead vocals, guitars, keyboards (2007–present)
- Charles Cave – bass guitar, keyboards, backing vocals (2007–present)
- Jack Lawrence-Brown – drums, percussion (2007–present)

=== Additional touring musician ===
- Tommy Bowen - keyboards (2008–present)

== Discography ==
- To Lose My Life... (2009)
- Ritual (2011)
- Big TV (2013)
- Friends (2016)
- Five (2019)
- As I Try Not to Fall Apart (2022)
- Night Light (2025)

== Awards and nominations ==
=== Awards ===
- 2013 Best Album Artwork: Big TV
- 2009 MOJO Honours Lists: MOJO Breakthrough Award
- 2009 Q Awards: Best New Band

=== Nominations ===
- 2009 NME Awards: Best New Band
- 2009 MTV Europe Music Awards: Best Push Artist
